= Hoo Peninsula =

Peninsula in Kent, England

Coordinates: 51.45°N 0.55°E

- Rural settlement
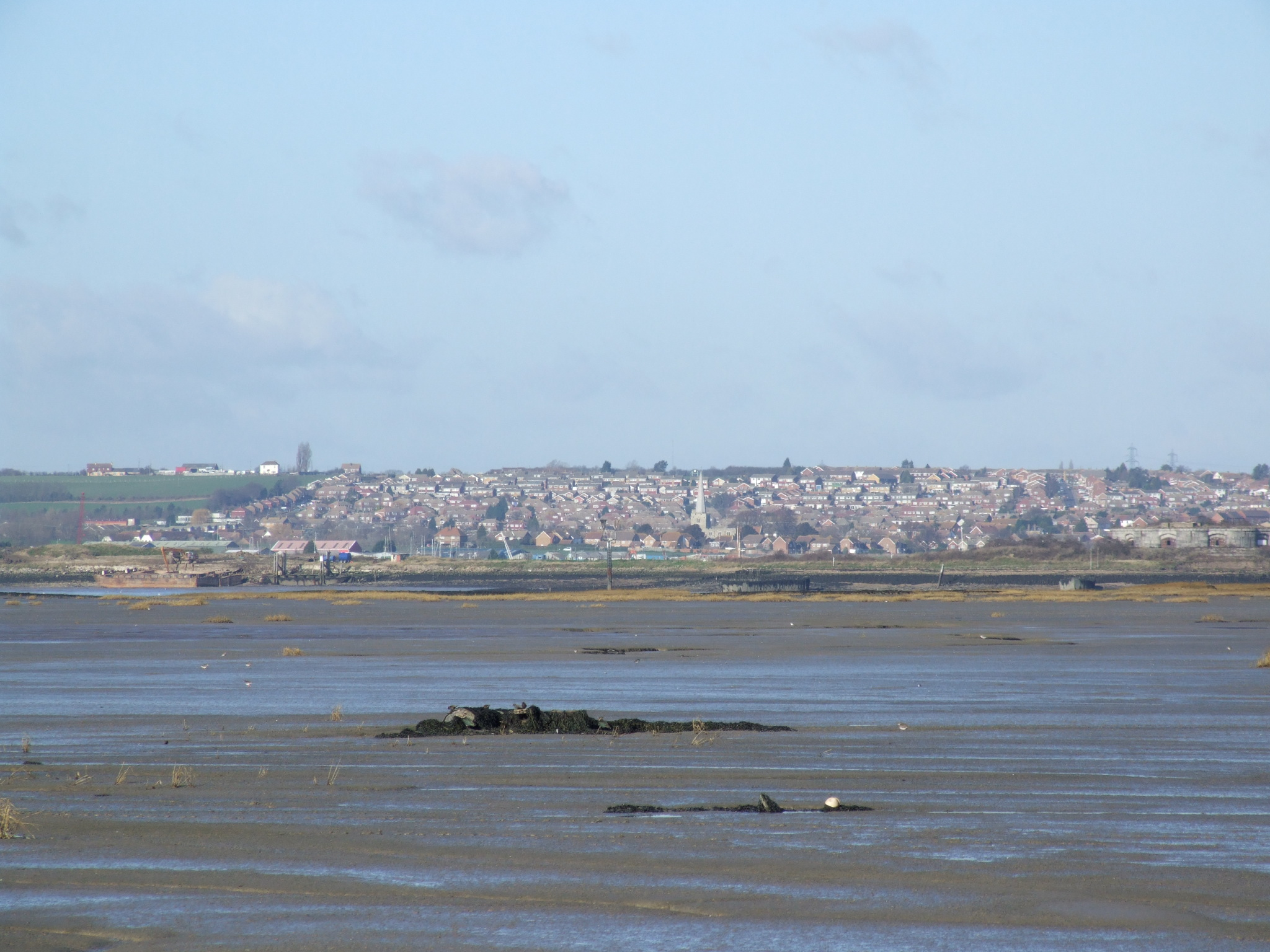
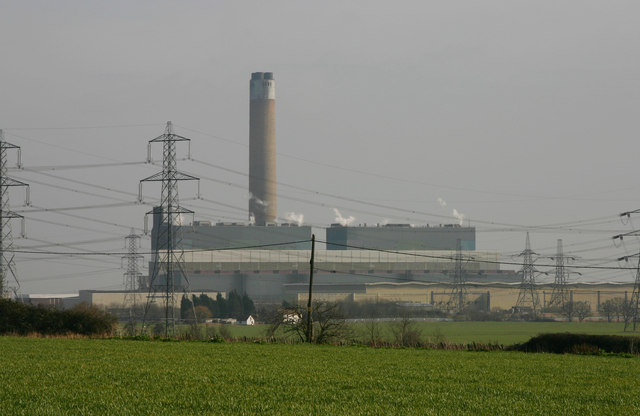
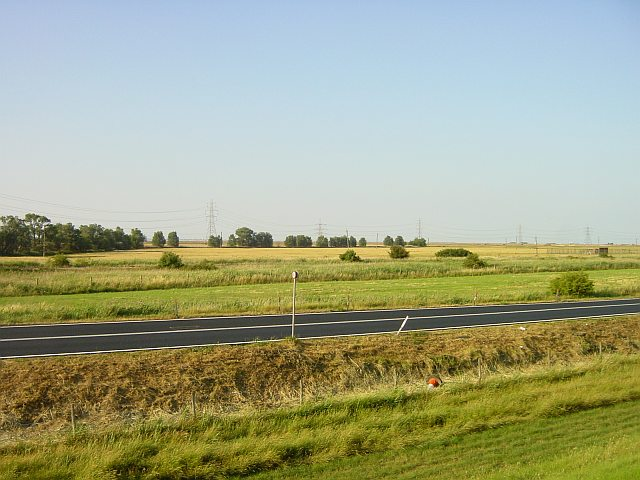
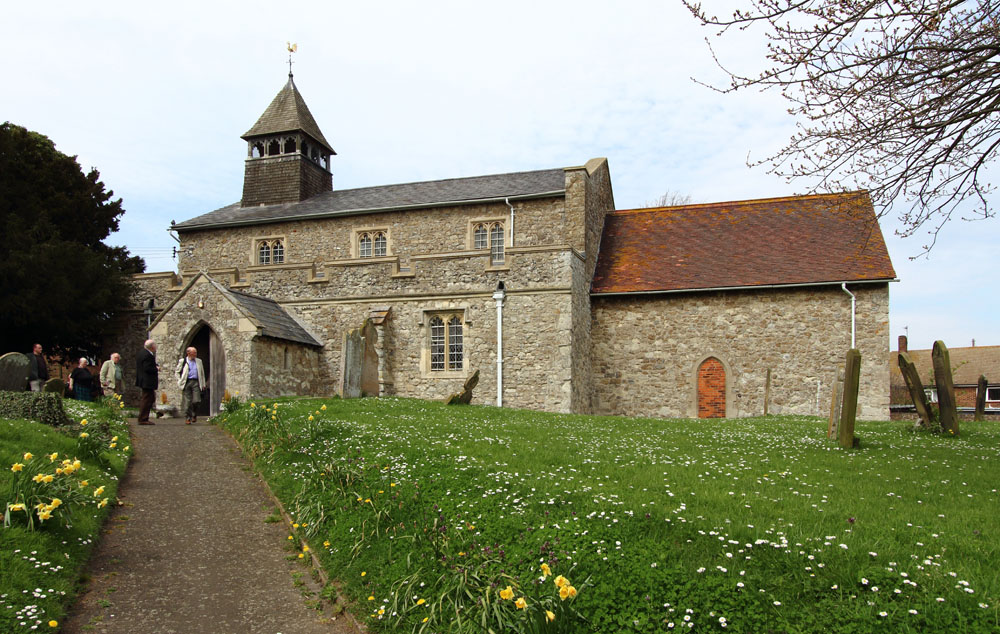
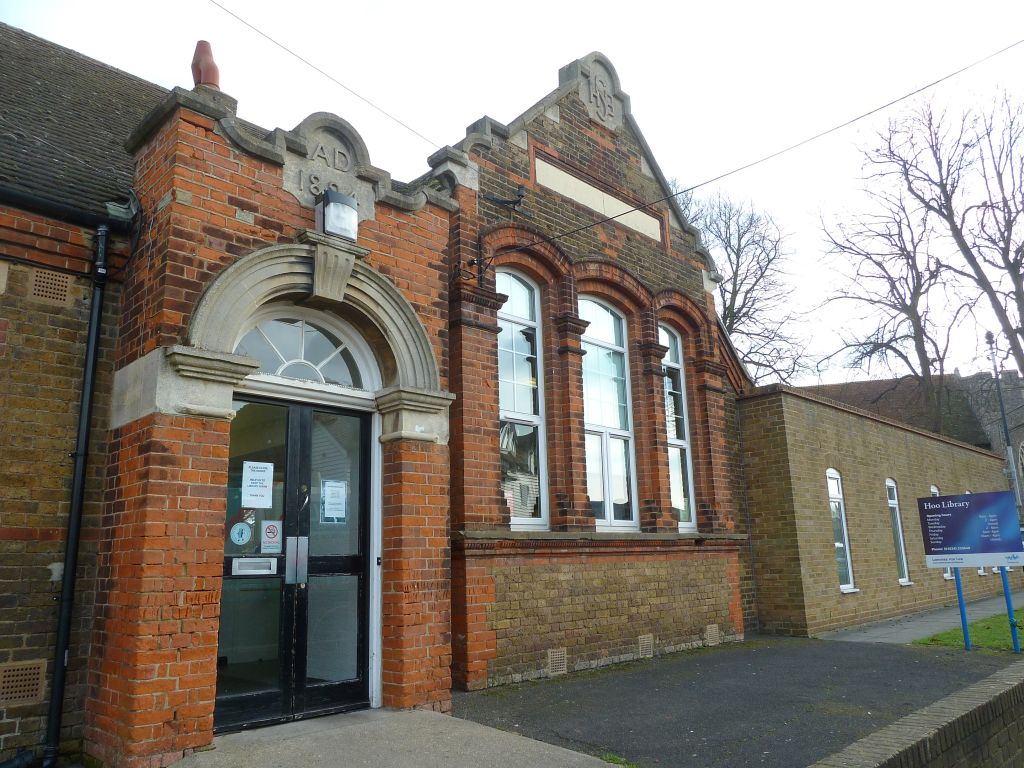
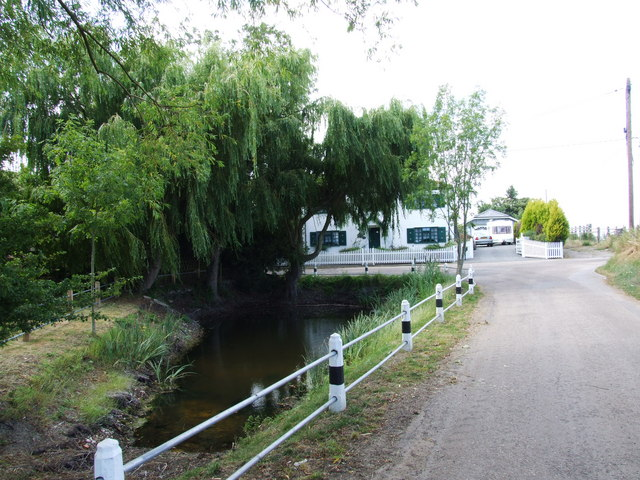
- Hoo St Werburgh Kingsnorth Power Station Stoke Marshes All Saints Church Hoo Library St Mary Hoo

- Location within Kent
- Population: 31,050
- OS grid reference: TQ7675
- Unitary authority: Medway
- Ceremonial county: Kent
- Region: South East
- Country: England
- Sovereign state: United Kingdom
- Post town: ROCHESTER
- Postcode district: ME3
- Dialling code: 01634
- Police: Kent
- Fire: Kent
- Ambulance: South East Coast
- UK Parliament: Rochester and Strood

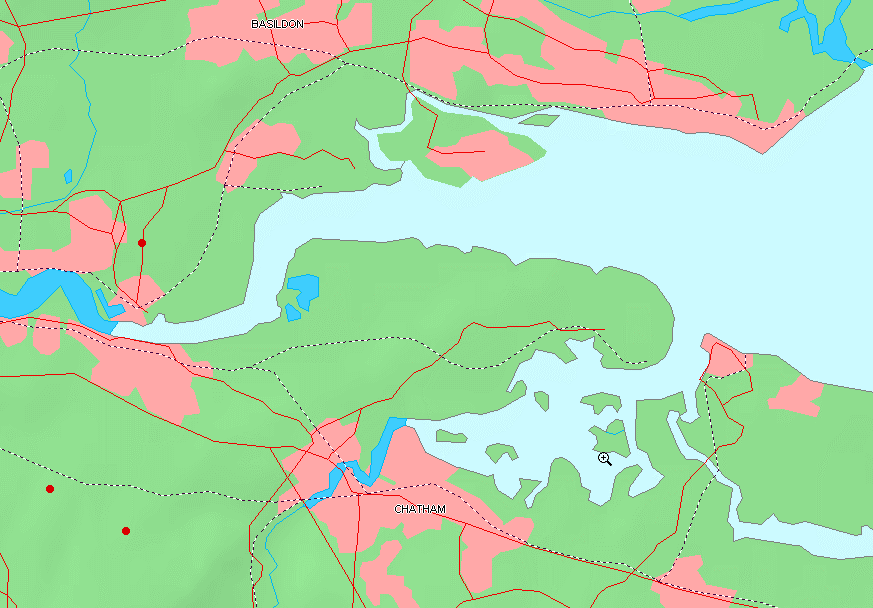
Hoo Peninsula

The Hoo Peninsula is a peninsula in Kent, England, separating the estuaries of the rivers Thames and Medway. It is dominated by a line of chalk, clay and sand hills, surrounded by an extensive area of marshland composed of alluvial silt. The name Hoo is a Saxon word believed to mean 'spur of land' or refers to the 'distinct heel-shape of the ridge of hills' through Hoo. Hoo features in the Domesday Book of 1086. The peninsula is home to internationally and nationally protected wildlife sites as well as industrial facilities and energy industries.

== History ==
The Romans have been credited with the first two attempts at building a sea wall. The subsequent draining of the marshes created pastureland to support sheep.

The area is rich in archaeology. Bronze Age implements and Jutish cemeteries have been found on the peninsula, and Roman pottery at Cooling. It was once the point of departure across the ancient Saxon fording point over the River Thames to Essex.

Much of the peninsula lies in the Hundred of Hoo, a hundred being a division of land used in Anglo-Saxon England. The Hundred of Hoo comprised the parishes and churches of Hoo, High Halstow, St Mary Hoo, Allhallows and part of Stoke. The Isle of Grain, then a complete island, was in the Hundred of Gillingham; the remainder of the parish of Stoke was in the Hundred of Shamel.

William the Conqueror granted his half-brother, Odo, the large estate of Hoo.

During the First World War this peninsula was the site of an explosives factory and storage facility.

== Geography ==
=== The marshes ===
The Peninsula's marshlands are part of the North Kent Marshes and now form a major part of two protected areas: the Thames Estuary and Marshlands, and the Medway Estuary and Marshes. The Thames Estuary area covers the 15 miles (24 km) from Gravesend to the Isle of Grain; the Medway Area 15 miles (24 km) from Rochester to the Isle of Grain: a total of 38 square miles (98 km^{2}) of marshlands. Both are Sites of Special Scientific Interest (SSSI) and Special Protected Areas (SPA). They include coastal grazing marsh, intertidal mudflats, saltmarsh and lagoons. On the line of hills lies the Northward Hill National Nature Reserve.

=== Nature reserve ===
The Hoo Peninsula is home to a 129.7 acre nature reserve located in High Halstow, one of the many villages on the peninsula, called High Halstow NNR. The reserve is also part of the Royal Society for the Protection of Birds Northward Hill SSSI site which includes 270 hectares of grazing marsh, woodland and farmland. The area features the largest heronry in Britain, where some 150–200 pairs nest. A heronry has been in the woods from at least 1947, when it was mentioned in a book, The Hundred of Hoo by Ralph Arnold. High Halstow NNR was declared a National Nature Reserve in 1951.

=== The Thames and Medway Canal ===
The Rivers Thames and Medway were joined by the eight-mile long Thames and Medway Canal, the construction of which started in 1805. With basins providing ports and access to the two rivers at Gravesend and Strood, the canal passed through a two-mile tunnel at Higham, broken in the centre by a shaft to allow boats to pass. Construction was difficult and expensive and it was not completed until 1824. Shortly afterwards, the tunnel became part of the railway linking Higham with Strood. The line of this now-silted canal can be considered a convenient boundary marking the landward edge of the peninsula.

The tunnel passes through large beds of chalk. To cut engineering costs many sections were not lined, which caused various rock falls between 1957 and 2004. As these rock falls could cause derailment, the tunnel was closed to trains during 2004 and was relined with reinforced concrete. It reopened in early January 2005.

=== Roads ===
The only main road is the A228, which crosses the old Roman London Road (also called Watling Street, now the A2) at Strood and then follows the high ground eastwards. It meets the Medway Towns Northern Bypass (A289) at the bottom of Four Elms Hill and climbs to Chattenden, bypassing Hoo St Werburgh and High Halstow, before crossing to the Isle of Grain. On the Peninsula this road is known as the 'Ratcliffe Highway'.

The other principal route on the peninsula, the B2000, heads north to Cliffe on the edge of Cliffe marshes, part of the North Kent Marshes. This is a winding country road, much used by industrial transport serving the larger farms, including Mockbeggar Farm, and the industrial jetties onto the River Thames. The B2000 passes through Cliffe Woods under the name of 'Town Road', and enters Cliffe, where it becomes first 'Station Road', from the location of the now vanished station of the Hundred of Hoo railway, and then 'Church Street'. At the northern edge of the village the road becomes 'Pond Hill' and leads down the cliff to an unmetalled track on the marshes.

The B2000 is rural in nature with several interesting old buildings along its route. There remains a Grade II listed red brick farmhouse dating from the 17th century 'Mockbeggar Farm' and its barn, 25 yards (23 m) south of the farmhouse, and a Grade II building 'Mortimer's Farm House, Cliffe'.

Another Grade II-listed farmhouse is Fenn Street Farmhouse, timber-framed and medieval in origin, with parts dated to the 15th century. Its age may be judged by the fact that in 1760 the building was refaced.

There are numerous other minor roads on the higher ground, and a number of roads and trackways across the marshes, some of which eventually reach the sea walls.

=== The Hundred of Hoo Railway ===
Hundred of Hoo Railway, shown with other railway lines in Kent.

A poster of the opening of the Allhallows-on-Sea branch.

In 1878, Henry Pye with a deputation of other local farmers met the South Eastern Railway Company with a request for a new railway to be built in the area. From this meeting a new company was established, the Hundred of Hoo Railway Company. The SER saw it as part of the development of continental traffic, and the ferry terminal at what was named Port Victoria was built as terminus of the line. The traffic did not materialise and that section of the line and the line beyond Grain closed in 1951.

The first part of the line to be opened was in March 1882, from Cliffe to Sharnal Street. This was later extended east to the Isle of Grain. Sharnal Street was the larger of the two original stations and was provided with goods sidings, where the local farmers were able to load their produce to be transported directly to the London markets. It was also at Sharnal Street that telegram and mail collections were effected.

On 14 May 1932 a branch railway was opened to the Thames estuary beyond the ancient village of Allhallows. It was intended to become a riverside resort of some size, and grandiose plans were formed. The new area was given the name of Allhallows-on-Sea. Little came of the scheme, and today all signs of that branch have disappeared, save for the water tower which supplied locomotives at the terminus – it is now a listed building. There is a holiday village on the site where the resort was intended to be.

== Industry ==
The strategic location of the Hoo peninsula gave rise to the development of a range of industrial and commercial facilities. It has been home to many land-hungry industries, including power stations, oil tank farms, oil refineries, gas plants, explosive works, a container terminal, and mineral workings. Many of these are on the Isle of Grain, but some are, or were, located at Kingsnorth on the south edge of the peninsula, up the River Medway from Grain, and at Cliffe at the western end of the peninsula.

=== Energy industry ===
A number of industrial facilities on the Hoo peninsula are associated with the energy – oil, gas, petroleum and electricity – industries. This includes five power stations (Grain, Grain CCGT, Kingsnorth, Medway and Damhead Creek); four oil refineries (Medway Oil & Storage Company, Berry Wiggins, BP Kent and Burmah-Total); three oil storage tank farms (Admiralty, MOSCO and BP Kent); two gas plants (SEGAS and Grain LNG); and a submarine power cable from the Netherlands (BritNed).

The oil industry was first established on the Hoo peninsula in 1908 when, in association with the naval dockyard at Sheerness, the Admiralty constructed an oil storage and ship refuelling depot at the Isle of Grain. This reflected the Royal Navy policy of building oil-fired ships which were faster, produced less visible smoke and could be refuelled at sea. By 1912 there were 19 oil tanks and two jetties in the deep water of the Medway. The tanks continued to be used until 1950s when they were incorporated into the BP refinery.

In 1923 the Medway Oil and Storage Company (MOSCO) constructed an oil refinery and tank farm close to the Admiralty site on a 132-acre (53-hectare) site acquired from the South Eastern Railway. The site included four groups of oil tanks of various sizes within earth embankments and two short jetties in the Medway. Crude oil was imported from Russia and refined on the site; the petrol was marketed as 'Power Petrol'; in 1927 it was 2½ d. per gallon cheaper than Shell petrol. There was an oil tank explosion on the site in 1925 that killed three workers. MOSCO was absorbed into the Anglo-Iranian group (later BP) in 1932 after which oil refining on Grain ceased. The MOSCO site was physically incorporated into the BP refinery in 1952.

In 1924 Berry Wiggins and Company built a plant to produce bitumen at Sharnal Street on the Isle of Grain. In 1930 Berry Wiggins started the construction of an oil refinery and tank farm at Kingsnorth (TQ817723) on the site of a First World War airship base. At first Berry Wiggins used the wharf at the head of Damhead Creek, but to allow larger tankers to unload in 1937 they built the 1 1/2 miles (2.4 km) Bee Ness Jetty into East Hoo Creek and the Kethole Reach of the River Medway (TQ842726). It was reputedly the longest jetty in Britain. Oil was transferred from the jetty to the refinery through steel pipes on the underside of the jetty walkway. From 1932 oil products were exported from the refinery via an east-facing connection from the single line Grain branch of Southern Railways, the Berry Wiggins branch included three sidings (TQ808735). In 1937 the refinery had an annual oil throughput of 90,000 tonnes, and by 1954 throughput was 65,000 tonnes per year. In 1952 Berry Wiggins built a new two-stage distillation unit at their refinery, and facilities to produce asphalt for road making and other oil-derived products. In 1964 the annual throughput was 190,000 tonnes. In 1973 Berry Wiggins planned to build a new bitumen refinery at Kingsnorth to take feedstock from the adjacent BP refinery and to close its own refinery. However, the 1973-4 world oil crisis prevented these plans being realised. The old Berry Wiggins Kingsnorth refinery closed in 1977. Bee Ness jetty is extant (2019) but is in a ruined condition. Oakham Ness jetty is south of Bee Ness jetty; it was built in 1964 as part of the construction of Kingsnorth power station and was used jointly by the power station and the Berry Wiggins refinery for the import of oil. It is 2 km long and runs across Oakham Marsh to the deep water of Kethole Reach of the River Medway (TQ840719). The long-disused physical connection of the Kingsnorth branch to the Grain branch railway (TQ813739) was severed in 2002.

Construction of the BP Refinery (Kent), unofficially known as Grain Refinery, was started in 1950 and the site opened in 1952. It had an initial throughput capacity of four million tonnes per year. A catalytic reformer and aromatics plant were built in 1962. By 1964 the capacity of the refinery had increased to 9,500 tonnes per year. The refinery began to process British North Sea crude oil from June 1975. BP Kent refinery closed in 1982 after which some of the site was taken over by British Gas for a liquefied natural gas facility.

In 1957 the South Eastern Gas Board (SEGAS) constructed a catalytic reformer plant adjacent to the BP Refinery to use light distillates (naphtha) from the refinery to reform into town gas. The SEGAS process was a low pressure cyclic catalytic process which used a catalyst based on lime or magnesia to promote the reaction between hydrocarbons and steam to produce town gas. The plant was made redundant when the British gas industry converted from town gas to natural gas during the period 1967–77.

The 2,000 MW Kingsnorth power station (TQ810721) opened in 1967 and burnt coal or oil, according to the economics of each. As with others in this area, the site has proved challenging. During building the reclaimed marshland was found to have poor load-bearing properties. Kingsnorth's ground level was some four feet below the highest tide even then, and tide levels are expected to rise another three feet in coming years. For the planners, these disadvantages were outweighed by the proximity to London, the availability of cooling water from the River Medway, and deep-water berthing for oil tankers and colliers.

Between 1971 and 1981 the Burmah-Total oil company planned to build an oil refinery on Cliffe marshes (TQ720786). However, the oil crises of 1973-4 and 1979-81 made the project uneconomic and the plans were abandoned.

Grain oil-fired power station was constructed on a 100 ha site (TQ886755) for the CEGB. It was commissioned in 1979 and had a projected output capacity of 3,300 MW. The power station was closed in 2015 and was subsequently demolished.

Medway Power Station (TQ8707467 is a 735 megawatts gas-fired power station on the Isle of Grain in Medway next to the River Medway, it was commissioned in 1995.

Damhead Creek (TQ809728) is a 792 MWe gas-fired Combined Cycle Gas Turbine (CCGT) power station, commissioned in 2001.

Grain LNG Terminal (TQ862759) is a facility for the import, storage and export of liquefied natural gas (LNG). It was developed from 2002 and is now a major facility for the British gas supply industry.

Grain CCGT power station is a 1,275 MW plant consisting of three natural gas-fired Combined Cycle Gas Turbine units, it was commissioned in May 2010, and cost £580 million. The power station is able to transfer up to 340 MW of heat energy recovered from the steam condensation to run the vaporisers in the nearby Liquefied natural gas terminal.

BritNed is a high-voltage direct-current (HVDC) submarine power cable between the Isle of Grain in Kent, the United Kingdom; and Maasvlakte in Rotterdam, the Netherlands. It was commissioned in 2011.

=== Other industries ===
Other industries on the Hoo peninsula include an explosives works at Cliffe. This was established in 1900 by Curtis and Harvey Limited on a 128 ha site near Lower Hope Point to manufacture nitroglycerine, cordite, dynamite and guncotton. The site was expanded during the first decade of the twentieth century and by 1908 was one of the largest in the country. Further expansion occurred during the First World War, although the site closed in 1921. The foundations of the building can be seen in the landscape

A cement works was established at Cliffe in about 1860 using locally mined chalk. The Alpha Cement works was established in 1910 and operated in various guises until 1970. Today the site is an aggregate import, storage and loading facility. Aggregate is offloaded at two jetties (TQ706767) on the River Thames adjacent to Cliffe fort. Aggregate is transferred along a 1.7 km conveyor to the main site (TQ720756) where railway wagons are loaded. Facilities include loading silos, an overhead conveyor and a loading gantry. The sidings are on a branch from the Grain branch railway line. The site is operated (2019) by Brett Aggregates Limited, formerly by Blue Circle.

In 1960 BP in partnership with California Chemicals built a petrochemical plant to manufacture synthetic fibres from oil by-products.

London Thamesport is a small container seaport in the Port of London on the River Medway (TQ865742) serving the North Sea. It is located on the Isle of Grain. It was first developed as a container port in 1989 and was developed as a deep-water port from 2001.

== Villages on the Hoo Peninsula ==
- Allhallows
- Chattenden
- Cliffe
- Cliffe Woods
- Cooling
- Frindsbury
- Grain
- High Halstow
- Hoo St Werburgh
- St Mary Hoo
- Spendiff
- Stoke
- Upnor
- Wainscott
