= HVDC Kingsnorth =

HVDC transmission line in England, the United Kingdom

HVDC Kingsnorth was a high-voltage direct-current (HVDC) transmission system from 1974 to 1986 connecting Kingsnorth in Kent to two sites in Greater London.

It was at one time the only application of the technology of HVDC for the supply of transformer stations in a city and the first HVDC link to be embedded within an AC system, rather than interconnecting two asynchronous systems. It was also the first HVDC scheme to be equipped with self-tuning harmonic filters and to be controlled with a "Phase Locked Oscillator", a principle which became standard on all HVDC systems.

It was designed in the late 1960s and went into service in 1974. It ran from Kingsnorth power station as a 59-kilometer bipolar (3-wire) underground cable. The positive pole operating at a voltage of +266 kV terminated at the converter station in Beddington near Croydon. The negative pole continued to run a further 26 kilometers (naturally) at -266 kV line to a similar station at Willesden in North London.

There was also the possibility, if the converter station in Kingsnorth was out of service, to run the system as monopolar HVDC between the Beddington and Willesden stations. The HVDC Kingsnorth was one of the last HVDC schemes equipped with mercury vapour rectifiers, which were ARAG/4-valves designed by English Electric. Each converter station for 266 kV consisted of two six-pulse valve bridges for 132 kV switched in series, which were each fed via a star-star and a star-delta connected transformer.

Apart from the Nelson River Bipole 1 system in Canada, all later-built HVDC systems used thyristor valves. The Kingsnorth HVDC scheme could transfer a maximum power of 640 megawatts (320 megawatts per pole).

In 1981, one mercury arc valve at Willesden Static Inverter Plant, was replaced by a H200 thyristor valve, developed by English Electric.

The system described was shut down in 1986 or 1987 following system reinforcement on the network it was embedded in. However the capacitor banks at Kingsnorth were used for voltage control on the network. These were later eradicated from the system as they contained PCB.

== Sites ==
Site	Coordinates
Kingsnorth converter station (out of service)	51°25′11″N 0°35′46″E
London-Beddington converter station (out of service)	51°22′23″N 0°7′38″W
London-Willesden converter station (out of service)	51°32′03″N 0°15′29″W
