= Damhead Creek power station =

Gas-fired power station in Kent, England

Damhead creek power station
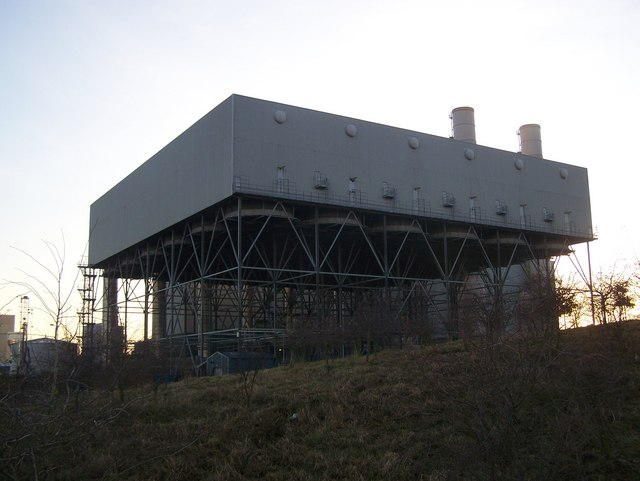
- Country: England
- Location: Hoo Kent
- Coordinates: 51°25′31″N 0°36′05″E
- Status: Operational
- Commission date: 2002
- Owner: See text
- Operators: VPI; Drax Group; ScottishPower

Thermal power station
- Primary fuel: Natural gas
- Turbine technology: CCGT
- Chimneys: 2
- Cooling source: Fin-fan air-cooled

Power generation
- Units operational: Two gas turbines, one steam turbine
- Nameplate capacity: 805 MW

External links
- Commons: Related media on Commons

Damhead Creek power station is a 792 MWe gas-fired power station in Kent, England, on the Hoo Peninsula, It is near the site of the decommissioned Kingsnorth power station. The plant entered service in February 2001.

== Ownership ==
Entergy, an American power firm, commissioned the plant. It was built by Raytheon Engineers and Constructor and Mitsubishi Heavy Industries, who provided the gas turbine equipment. The company trades as Damhead Creek Ltd.

On 2 June 2004, the plant was bought by Scottish Power for £317 million.

The plant was purchased and operated by Drax Generation Enterprise Ltd in 2018 before being sold to Vitol's VPI Holding in December 2020.

== Specification ==
Natural gas is brought to Damhead Creek via a 3 km pipeline from the national transmission system. Gas is burned in two Mitsubishi 701F gas turbines, the expanding exhaust drives the turbines at 3000 rpm. Each gas turbine is coupled to a hydrogen-cooled turbo generator which generates electricity. The hot (548°C) exhaust gases from the turbines each enter a (Dutch) NEM heat recovery steam generators (HRSG). The steam from the HRSG enters a single 216 MWe Mitsubishi steam turbine. The steam turbine, running at 3000 rpm, is coupled to a third hydrogen-cooled turbo generator. Exhaust steam from the steam turbine flows to the air-cooled condenser. The condenser comprises 36 cooling fans each 10 metres in diameter drawing ambient air across the heat exchanger with an area of 105 hectares condensing the steam into water. The condensed water returns to the HRSG via heat recovery boilers. The exhaust gases from the HRSG are vented to atmosphere via the stations two 75 metre chimneys.

The gas turbines are fitted with low-NOx burners which reduces the emission of nitrogen oxides.

The thermal efficiency is about 55%.

When Kingsnorth power station was in operation, the cooling water was abstracted from the Medway and discharged at the head of Damhead Creek. This arrangement prevented hot water recirculating to the intake.

== Damhead Creek 2 ==
On 9 March 2009, Scottish Power announced plans to develop a second 1,000 MW gas-fired power station adjacent to the current power station to be named Damhead Creek 2. The plans were not taken forward.

Scottish Power put forward another proposal for Damhead Creek 2 (DHC2) in 2017. This was to be a gas-fired1800 MW CCGT plant adjacent to the existing station. It would comprise three generating sets each consisting of a gas turbine, heat recovery steam generator (HRSG) and a steam turbine in a single shaft configuration. Each CCGT would have an electrical capacity of 600MWe with a thermal input of 1,093 MWth each. The energy conversion is expected to be over 60%. In addition there would be a 23.1 MWth gas fired auxiliary boiler to startup the HRSG. There would be 2.8 MWth diesel generator for emergency shutdown.

VPI Holding carried on the Scottish Power plan. This was to be a 1800 MW CCGT used for peak load and would comprise three gas turbines and three steam turbines. Construction was due to start in 2024 with operation in 2025.

== See also ==
- Salt End Power Station
- Medway power station
- Grain power station
- Kingsnorth power station
