= Isle of Grain =

Village in Kent, England

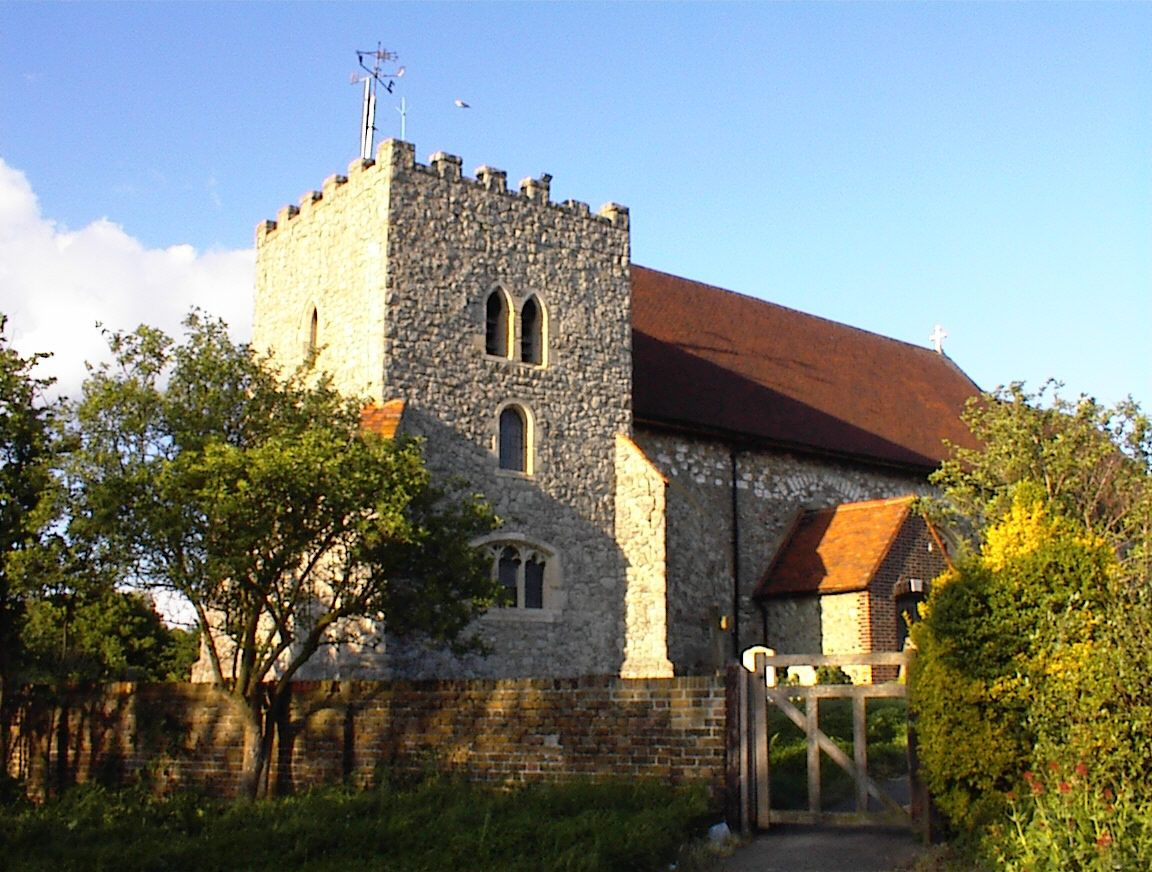
- St James Church

- Location within Kent
- Population: 1,648 (2011)
- OS grid reference: TQ8876
- Civil parish: Isle of Grain
- Unitary authority: Medway
- Ceremonial county: Kent
- Region: South East
- Country: England
- Sovereign state: United Kingdom
- Post town: ROCHESTER
- Postcode district: ME3
- Dialling code: 01634
- Police: Kent
- Fire: Kent
- Ambulance: South East Coast
- UK Parliament: Rochester and Strood

Isle of Grain (Old English Greon, meaning gravel) is a village and the easternmost point of the Hoo Peninsula within the district of Medway in Kent, south-east England. Once an island and now forming part of the peninsula, the area is almost all marshland and is a major habitat for diverse wetland birds. The village constitutes a civil parish, which at the 2011 census had a population of 1,648, a net decrease of 83 people in 10 years.

== History ==
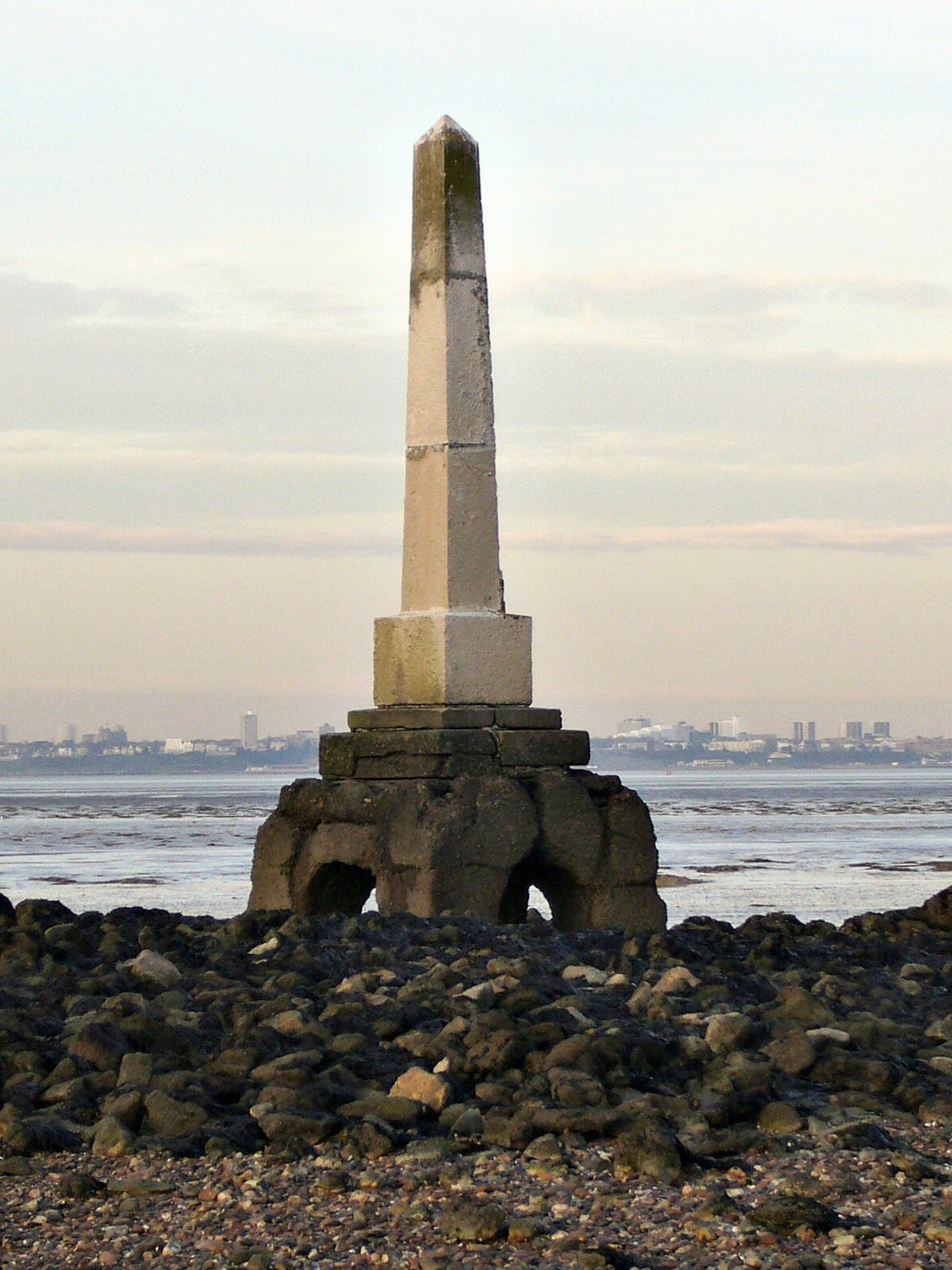
London Stone, Yantlet Creek

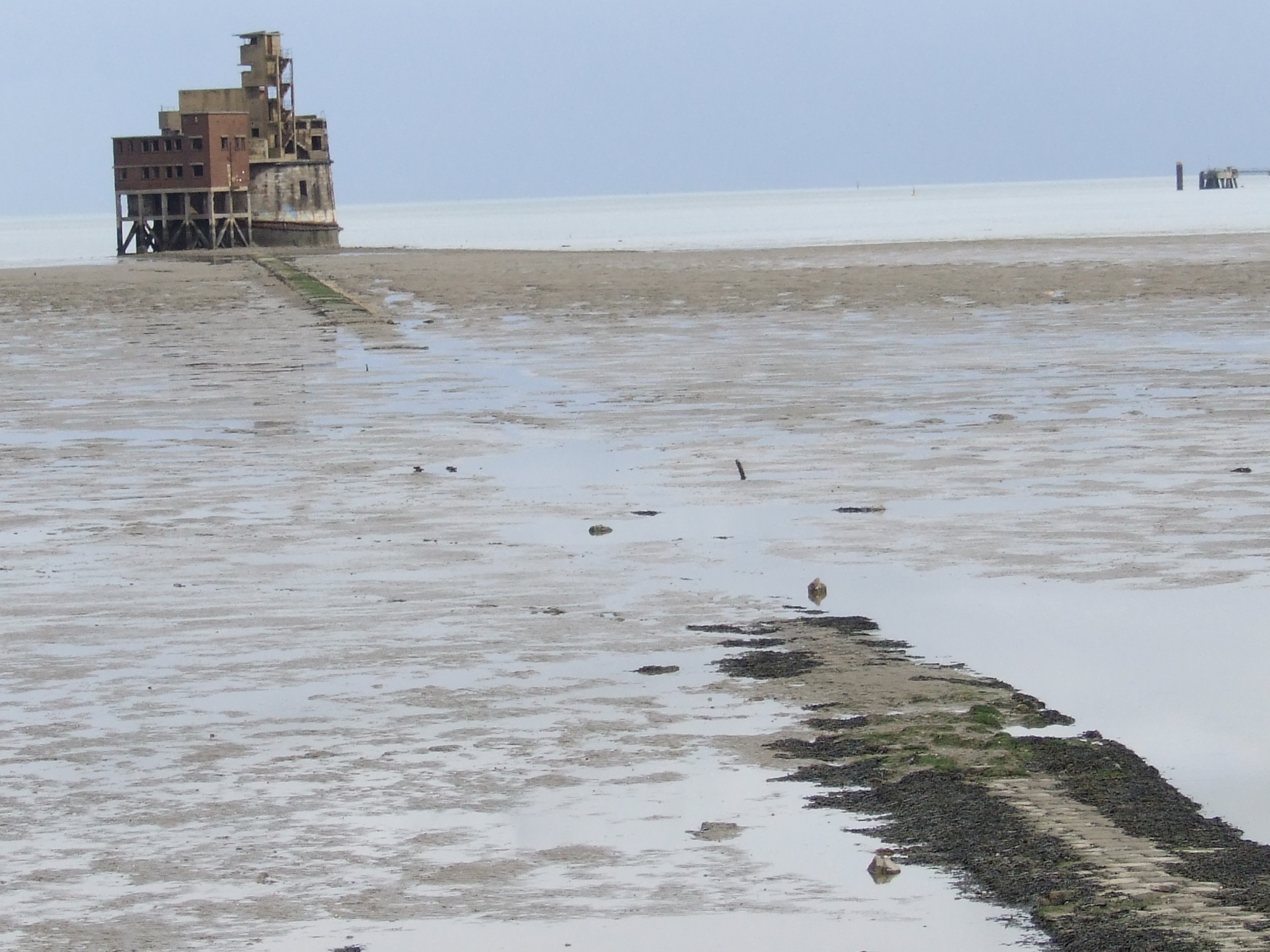
The Grain Tower (constructed in 1855), and causeway seen at low tide 2008

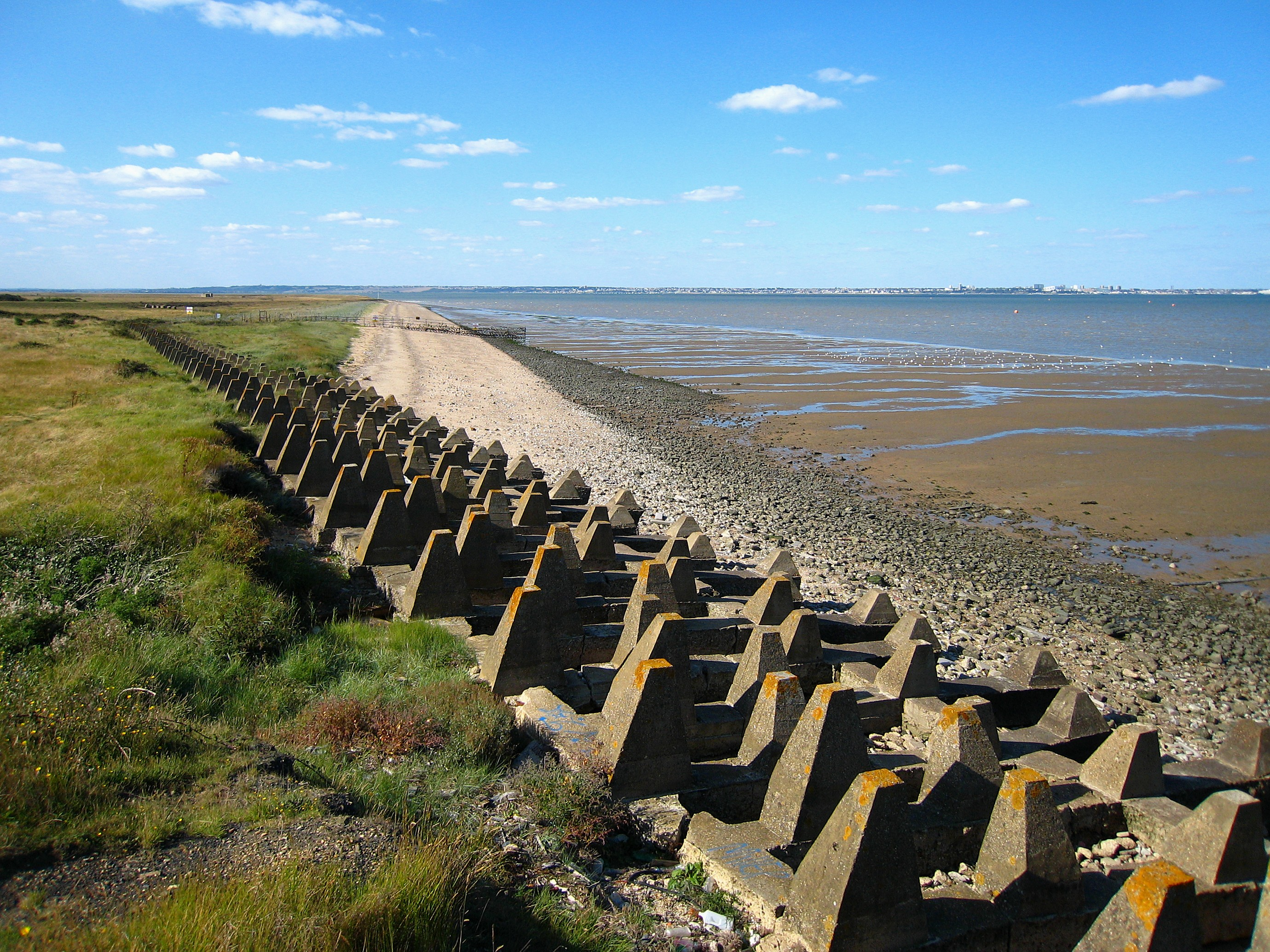
Anti-tank obstacles on the beach at the Isle of Grain

Extract from the Topographical Dictionary of Great Britain and Ireland by John Gorton, 1833:

GRAINE, ISLE OF, co. Kent

A parish in the Hundred of Hoo, lathe of Aylesford, opposite to Sheppey at the mouth of the Thames; it is about three miles and a half long, and two and a half broad and is formed by Yantlet Creek running from the Medway to the Thames. The Creek was filled up, and had a road across it for 40 years until 1823, when the Lord Mayor ordered it to be again reopened, so as to give about eight feet navigation for barges at spring tide; thus saving a distance of fourteen miles into the Medway, and avoiding the danger of going round by the Nore.

The severing of the road resulted in an inconclusive High Court case in 1824, and by 1835 the causeway had been reinstated. The goods route from the Medway Towns to the upper Thames Estuary was later shortened by the Thames and Medway Canal, although this route, too, was abandoned.

In various warm years the incidence of "marsh fever" (malaria) was extremely high. Since the removal of livestock from marshy areas, the number of native mosquitoes has greatly declined, and Britain's last recorded outbreak of malaria was in 1918.

Yantlet Creek at the south of the Yantlet Line was the downstream limit of the City of London's ownership of the bed of the River Thames. It is marked by a London Stone beside the mouth of the creek. Its successor for navigation purposes, the Port of London Authority, also owns the river bed down to here but has navigation policing rights on a debatable area of estuary or sea as far as the seaside resort of Margate which has normal sea salinity.

Grain Tower, a fort about a quarter of a mile off-shore and accessible at low tide, was completed in 1855. Concrete emplacements and shelters were added during the World Wars when the tower, in addition to mounting guns, was used as a boom control point. The boom was a chain supporting antisubmarine nets across the two rivers, preventing entry by German U-boats. The tower was decommissioned in 1956.

The Isle of Grain was also the site of Grain Fort, built in the 1860s and used for coastal defence until the 1950s. The fort was almost completely demolished about 1960, leaving only the original earth rampart, complete with some tunnels running underground.

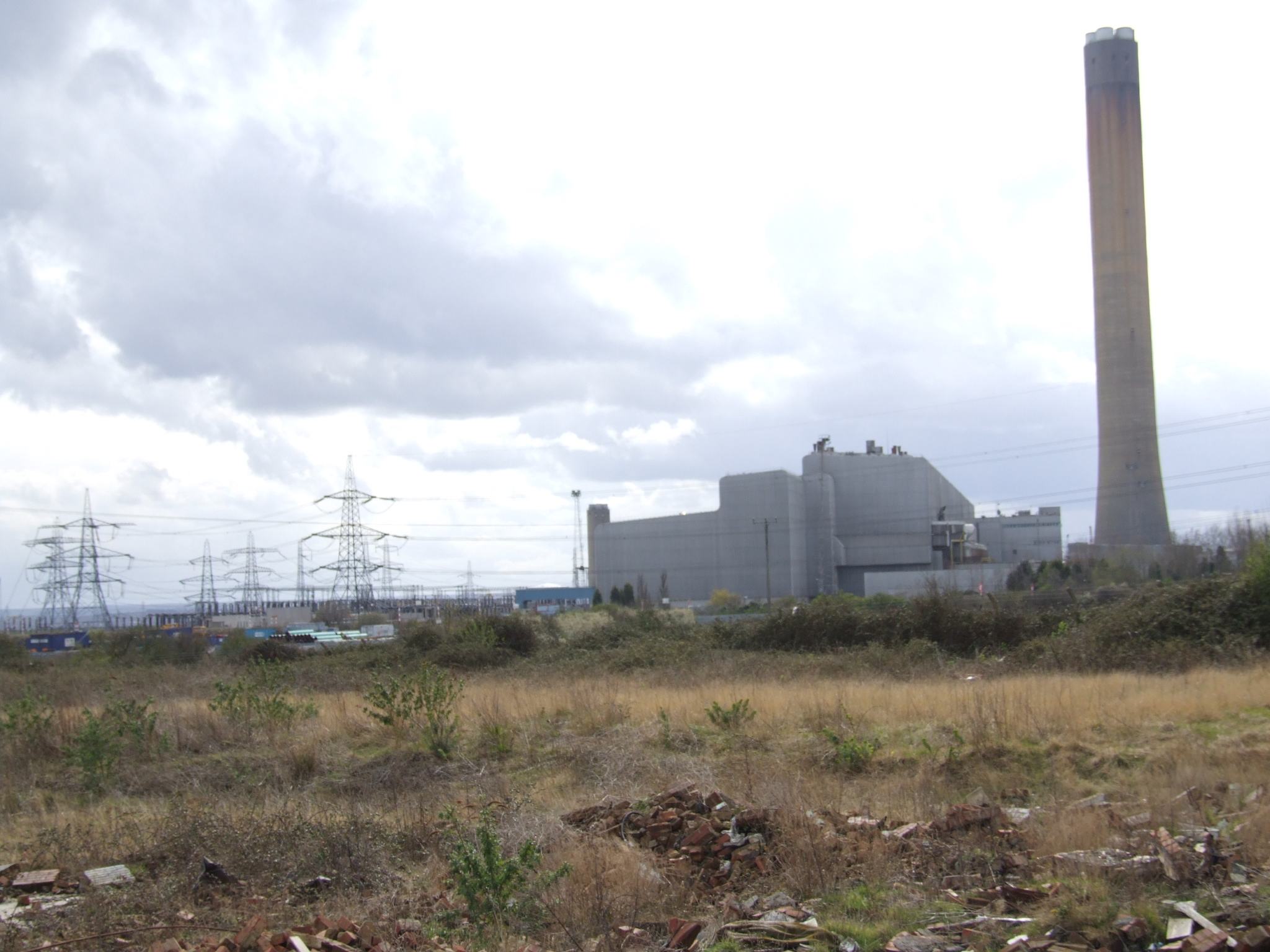
The oil-fired power station from the village.

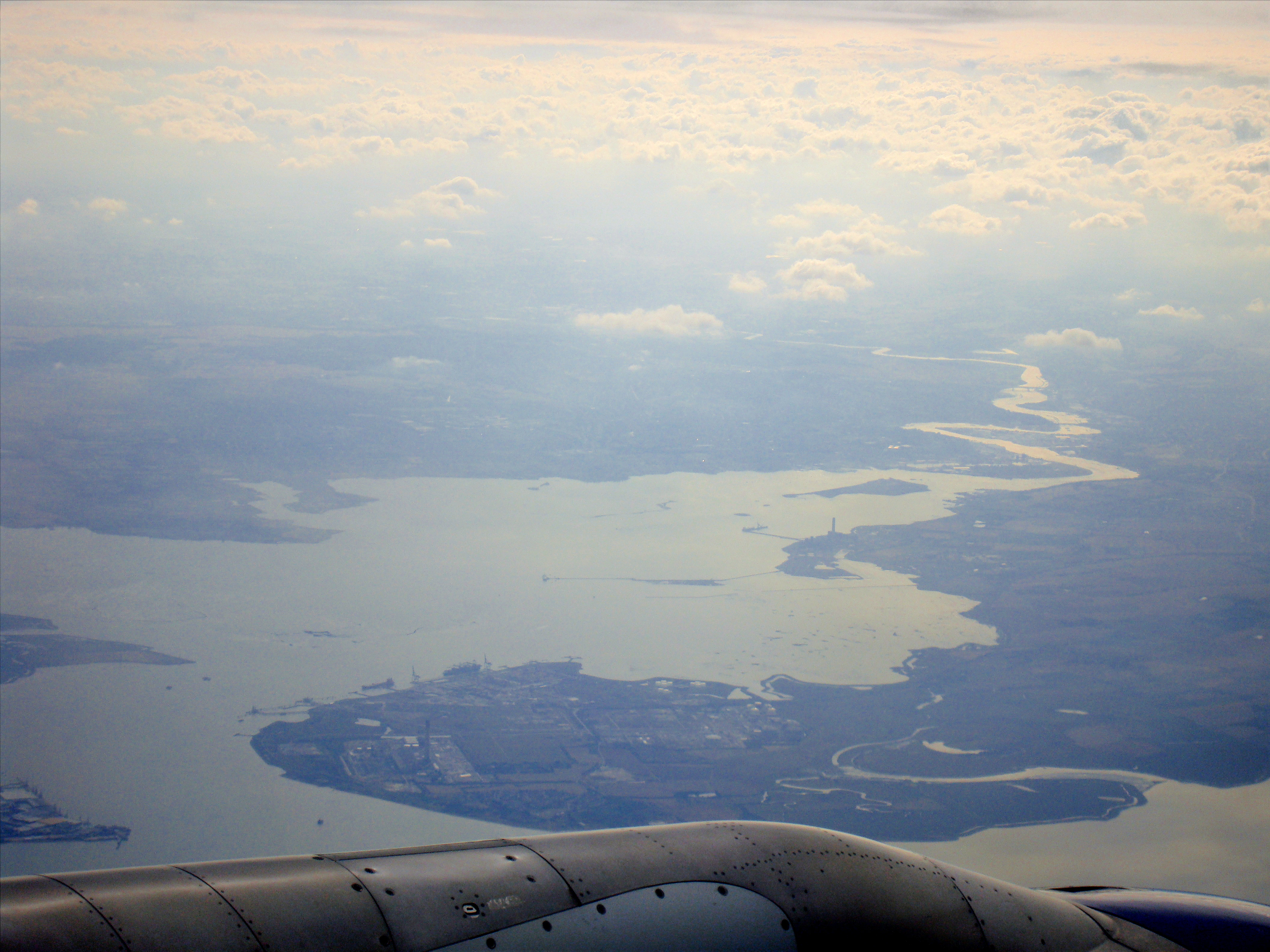
Isle of Grain and the Medway Estuary from the air

Until 1982 the south of the Isle was home to the large Kent oil refinery. Construction of this facility for BP took from 1948 to 1952, and it suffered flooding almost immediately when the North Sea flood of 1953 breached the sea wall.

In the 1990s the refinery site was chosen for a purpose-built facility to make concrete lining segments for the Channel Tunnel. There was not the space to make the sections at the Shakespeare Cliff construction site near Folkestone at the tunnel's entrance, so the Isle of Grain was used because large quantities of granite aggregate could be delivered there by ship from Glensanda in Scotland, and the finished sections could then be transported by a pre-existing rail link to east Kent. Following completion of the Channel Tunnel, the site is now part-occupied by London Thamesport, the UK's third largest container port. The remainder is allocated for industrial and warehousing use under the Thames Gateway project.

Next to the former BP site is Grain Power Station, built in the 1970s, which previously burnt oil. It was mothballed in 2003, but reopened in 2006 to provide up to three per cent of the National Grid supply. The oil-fired power station was demolished in 2015 and a new gas-fired station now stands on the site. Another major installation is a new Grain Liquefied Natural Gas (LNG) import facility.

The Isle of Grain is the landing point for the BritNed undersea power cable between The Netherlands and the UK. It will also be the landing point for the NeuConnect interconnector linking the UK to Germany, planned for completion in 2028.

== Settlements ==
An 1801 map shows that the ancient village of Grain was at one time called St James in the Isle of Grain. Like others in the Hundred of Hoo, the village was named after the dedication of its parish church; for example Allhallows (All Saints), St Mary Hoo, Hoo St Werburgh.

Wallend is the other settlement, now uninhabited and contained within a fenced-off industrial site. The Medway Power Station now occupies the site.

== Port Victoria ==
Local historian Alan Bignell gives this description of the new port and accompanying railway:

In the late 1870s the South Eastern Railway decided to promote a line through the (Hoo) district, with a view to competing for the traffic from London to Sheerness, formerly an almost unchallenged stronghold of the London, Chatham and Dover Railway. For some years past a steamer had been running from Sheerness to Strood, whence South Eastern trains gave a connection to London. ... the journey was of some length, along the rather tortuous course of the Medway. In 1879 the South Eastern obtained an act for a branch leaving their North Kent line at a point about (3.5 miles) from Gravesend ... to Stoke ... In the following year powers were obtained for an extension, (3.5 miles) long, to St James, in the Isle of Grain, where a deep-water pier was to be built on the Medway. A ferry was to connect the new pier with Sheerness ...

The railway was opened throughout on 11 September 1882. The pier was built for passenger traffic and Queen Victoria was a passenger. Bignell records that she "took a rather curious fancy to Grain as a chosen departure point for trips to Germany" and there are claims that Port Victoria "was built essentially as a railway station at the end of a line from Windsor".

The project was not a success and the ferry service was withdrawn in 1901, and the pier upon which the station was located fell into disuse by 1931, with the station moving to a new site just inland. It was closed completely in 1951, and the 1.75 miles (2.82 km) of line taken up. The site is now occupied by industry, though the foundations of the pier are still visible at low tide to this day and are clearly visible on aerial photographs of the area at coordinates 51.433253°N 0.703179°E.

From about 1912 an airship station, RNAS Kingsnorth was positioned at Grain by the Admiralty. From the beginning of World War I regular patrols were made along the Thames estuary from this station, as part of English Channel defences. In 1914 Port Victoria housed a Royal Navy aircraft repair depot adjacent to the station. Activities at these bases declined after 1918, until in 1924 defence cuts saw their closure. The site is now occupied by Kingsnorth Power Station.

But soon the course of the ship opens the entrance of the Medway, with its men-of-war moored in line, and the long wooden jetty of Port Victoria, with its few low buildings like the beginning of a hasty settlement upon a wild and unexplored shore. The famous Thames barges sit in brown clusters upon the water with an effect of birds floating upon a pond.

— Joseph Conrad, The Mirror of the Sea

== Airport proposal ==
A suggestion in 2003 to site a new London international airport to lie just west of Grain aroused a lot of local opposition, as well as from environmental groups such as the Royal Society for the Protection of Birds.

In November 2011 architects Foster & Partners published proposals to expand the transport system of South East England. These, called the Thames Hub, would include building a new four-runway airport on the Isle of Grain, partially on land reclaimed from the estuary. This plan was controversial. On 13 April 2012, Richard Deakin, the head of National Air Traffic Services, commented that "the very worst spot you could put an airport is just about here ... We're a little surprised that none of the architects thought it worthwhile to have a little chat."

In an interim report on 17 December 2013, the Airports Commission shortlisted three options. Grain was not among them. The commission's final recommendations were released in July 2015. These stated that a Grain airport "had substantial disadvantages that collectively outweighed potential benefits", and the proposal was then abandoned.

== Sport ==
On 16 June 1857 the Isle was the site of a heavyweight championship prize-fight between William Perry (known as the Tipton Slasher) and Tom Sayers. The fight was won by Sayers who claimed the title of heavyweight champion of England.

== See also ==
- Listed buildings in the Isle of Grain
- Islands in the River Thames

Next island upstream	River Thames	Next island downstream
Two Tree Island	Isle of Grain; Grid reference TQ8876	Isle of Sheppey
