= Grain Power Station =

Power station in Kent, England

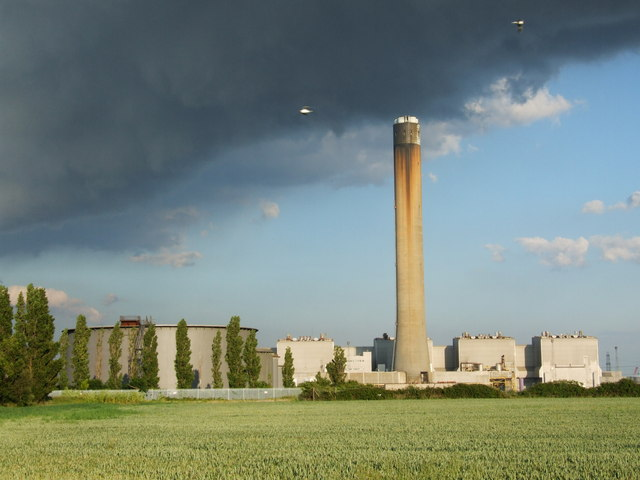
- Country: England
- Location: Isle of Grain; Kent
- Coordinates: 51°26′46″N 0°42′47″E
- Status: Decommissioned and demolished
- Construction began: 1975
- Commission date: 1979
- Decommission date: 2012
- Owners: Central Electricity Generating Board (1979–1990); PowerGen (1990–2002); E.ON UK (2002–2012))
- Operator: As owner

Thermal power station
- Primary fuel: Oil-fired
- Tertiary fuel: Natural gas
- Site area: 100 hectare
- Chimneys: One (244 metres)
- Cooling towers: None
- Cooling source: River / sea water
- Combined cycle?: Yes

Power generation
- Units operational: 5 (2 oil, 3 gas) 660 MW
- Units decommissioned: All
- Nameplate capacity: 1,320 MW (1,770,000 hp) (oil)
- Annual net output: See text

Grain Power Station is a 1,275 megawatts (1,710,000 hp) operational CCGT power station in Kent, England, owned by Uniper (formerly E.ON UK). It was also the name of an oil-fired, now demolished, 1,320 MW power station in operation from 1979 to 2012.

== Oil-fired power station ==
Grain power station was built on a 250-acre (100 ha) site for the nationalised Central Electricity Generating Board. The architects were Farmer & Dark with Donald Rudd and Partners. It was built by several contractors including John Laing Construction (Civils), the Cleveland Bridge Company (steel frame and cladding), N. G. Bailey (electrical), Babcock & Wilcox (boilers) and GEC Turbine Generators Ltd (steam turbines). The site was selected in 1971 and construction had begun by 1975. The station became operational in 1979.

The principal buildings were the main boiler house – turbine house block, an attached central control wing, a detached range of offices, the chimney and a gas turbine power station. The buildings were steel framed and reinforced concrete construction. The main boiler house – turbine house block was nearly half a kilometre long. The larger buildings had curved eaves and slightly pitched roofs, an attempt to reduce the visual impact of the site.

Grain power station was located at London Thamesport on the Isle of Grain, where the River Medway flows into the Thames Estuary. The station had the second-tallest chimney in the UK, at 244 m (801 ft), visible from a wide area of North Kent and parts of South Essex. The chimney was built by specialist contractors Bierrum and Partners Ltd; Drax Power Station has the tallest chimney, at 259 m (850 ft).

Grain power station adjoins the site of the BP Kent oil refinery, which closed in 1982. The station burned oil to drive, via steam turbines, two 690 megawatts (930,000 hp) (gross power output – but 30 megawatts (40,000 hp) was used on-site, leaving 660 megawatts (890,000 hp) for export to the Grid) alternators. There were four boilers rated at 592 kg/s, steam conditions were 538 °C, with 538 °C reheat. The station was capable of generating enough electricity to supply approximately 2% of Britain's peak electricity needs.

The station was originally designed to have a total capacity of 3,300 megawatts (4,400,000 hp) from five sets of boiler/turbine combinations. The two remaining oil-fired generating units were mothballed by Powergen in 2002 and 2003, but almost immediately the company began to consider reopening the plant as electricity prices increased rapidly. It was operated by E.ON UK who also operated the nearby Kingsnorth coal-fired station, now also decommissioned. The station had four 113MW_{th} open cycle gas turbines fueled by gas oil. These provided electricity for a black start and emergency generation.

=== Closure and demolition ===
The plant did not meet the emissions requirements of the Large Combustion Plant Directive and was required to close by 2015.

However, due to the rising costs of maintaining the plant, E.ON UK, the owners of Grain power station, announced that Grain was to be mothballed and the site closed by 31 December 2012. The oil-fired power station generated no further electricity but was maintained as standby capacity for the grid throughout 2013.

In April 2014, the dismantling process at the site began, being carried out by Brown and Mason Ltd; it was expected to take around two years to complete.

On 10 May 2015, three buildings on the site were demolished. Three of the five boiler houses were demolished by explosives on 2 August 2015. The 244 m (801 ft) tall chimney was demolished on 7 September 2016. Until 2014, BBC Radio Kent maintained an outside broadcast reception antenna on top of the chimney. The chimney is the UK's largest structure to have been demolished, surpassing the 173 m (568 ft) New Brighton Tower in Wallasey, Cheshire which was demolished between 1919 and 1921.

=== Electricity output ===
Electricity output for Grain power station over the period 1979-1987 was as follows.

Grain gas turbine plant annual electricity output GWh
Grain power station annual electricity output GWh

The load factor in 1984/5 was greater than 100 per cent. Rotational capability plant was being operated at Grain, Ince and Littlebrook oil-fired power stations; this was in the context of the 1984–5 miners strike.

== Grain CCGT power station ==
Grain CCGT power station
- Country: England
- Location: Isle of Grain, Kent
- Coordinates: 51°26′35″N 0°42′29″E
- Status: Operating
- Construction began: 2007
- Commission date: 2010
- Construction cost: £500 million
- Owners: E.ON UK (2007-2016), Uniper (2016-present)
- Operators: E.ON UK (2010-2016), Uniper (2016-present)

Thermal power station
- Primary fuel: Natural gas
- Turbine technology: Gas-fired gas turbines, steam turbines
- Chimneys: 3 (92 metres)
- Cooling towers: 0
- Cooling source: Once through seawater

Power generation
- Units operational: 3 x 425MWe
- Make and model: Alstom GT26
- Nameplate capacity: 1,275MW

Also known as Grain power station and Grain CHP power station.

=== Overview ===
The 1,275 MW CCGT power station was constructed on the same site. It consists of three natural gas-fired combined cycle gas turbine units capable of generating enough electricity to supply around one million homes. E.ON was given planning consent to build the station in 2006. Construction work by Alstom started in May 2007 and was finished in May 2010, at a cost of £500 million (some sources state £580 million). The first gas turbine was first fired on 2 June 2010. The overall efficiency was expected to be 72%.

The power station also operates in a combined heat and power (CHP) mode as it is able to transfer up to 340MW of heat energy recovered from the steam condensation to run the vaporisers in the nearby liquefied natural gas terminal, allowing for a reduction in carbon emissions of up to 350,000 tonnes a year.

=== Plant description ===
Grain CCGT power station has three Alstom GT26 gas turbines. The scheme is designed on three Alstom KA26 Single-Shaft Combined Cycle Power Plant Power Blocks; these include a STF30C reheat steam turbine, a heat recovery steam generator and a TOPGAS hydrogen-cooled turbogenerator each.

The GT26 gas turbines are a lean-premix, low NOx, machines. They have three rows of variable guide vanes on the compressor stage giving a high turndown ratio. The turbines are optimised to use natural gas, there is no requirement to use fuel oil. Natural gas is supplied to Grain through a 3.5 km pipeline from an offtake on the National Transmission System.

Hot gases from the gas turbine pass to the heat recovery steam generator (HRSG) where they are used to generate steam from a natural circulating water system. The steam is used to drive a three-casing STF30C triple-pressure reheat steam turbine on the same shaft as the gas turbine, which is also coupled to a TOPGAS hydrogen cooled generator. Cooled gases from the HRSG are discharged to atmosphere via a 92-metre high chimney, one for each unit. Steam from the steam turbine is condensed in the water-cooled condenser and is returned to the HRSG. Cooling water for the condenser (flowrate 226,008 m^{3}/h) is a once through system with water abstracted from, and returned to, the river Medway. The intake and outfall structures of the demolished oil-fired station were reused. The maximum return temperature is no more than 18 °C above the inlet temperature. An electro-chlorination system at the inlet inhibits biofouling in the cooling water circuit.

Electricity from the station is fed via step up transformers into the National Grid at the existing 400 kV compound.

The whole power station plant is controlled by an ABB 800xA system which provides a centralised operator interface for monitoring, control, start-up and shutdown.

The local soil, alluvium overlying London Clay, is poor quality to support heavy structures. During construction up to 3,000 piles were used to support the heaviest plant. A similar issue had arisen when the adjacent BP Kent oil refinery was constructed in the 1950s; 6,000 piles had been used during its initial construction.

==== Combined heat and power ====
In combined cycle mode the power units have an overall efficiency of 58.6%. In CHP mode the efficiency is 72.6%. In CHP mode water from the condensers is routed to Grain LNG terminal where it is used to vaporise liquefied natural gas (LNG). Up to 341 MW of thermal energy can be transferred. This reduces carbon emissions up to 350,000 tonnes per year. In this mode the power station condensers are isolated and purged of seawater. The condensers are connected to the submerged combustion vaporisers (SCV) in the LNG plant by two 2.5 km pipelines (water supply and return) 1.4 m in diameter. In this mode the SVCs use the warm closed circuit demineralised water system to vaporise the LNG instead of natural gas. The water supply temperature to the vaporisers is 42.5 °C and return is 15 °C. Water flowrates are 330 to 2,980 kg/s. Material selection and water chemistry are designed to prevent stress corrosion cracking of the stainless steel SCV tube bundles.

=== Development ===
The operator aims to make Grain carbon-neutral by 2035. Studies may include using hydrogen as an alternative to natural gas, or a carbon capture and storage (CCS) facility using post-combustion carbon dioxide capture technology. The CO_{2} would be transported by ship or pipeline to a depleted offshore gas field.

== Incidents ==
On 18 February 2022 during Storm Eunice, one of the chimney stacks collapsed. The power station was temporarily taken offline for safety.

== See also ==
- Medway power station
- Damhead Creek power station
- Grain LNG terminal
- Kingsnorth power station
