= Medway Power Station =

Gas-fired power station

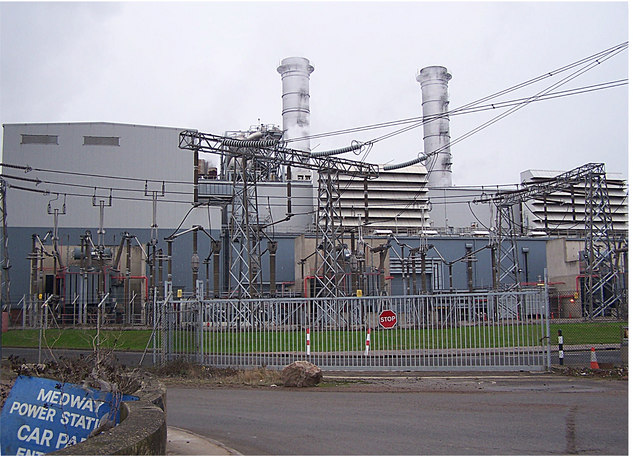
- Country: England
- Location: Isle of Grain
- Coordinates: 51°26′23″N 0°41′24″E
- Status: Operating
- Construction began: 1992
- Commission date: 1995
- Owner: Medway Power Limited

Thermal power station
- Primary fuel: Natural gas
- Secondary fuel: Fuel oil
- Turbine technology: Gas fired gas turbines, Heat recovery steam generators and steam turbine
- Site area: 11 acre
- Site elevation: Above 200 year storm tide
- Chimneys: 2 (65 metre)
- Cooling towers: 0
- Cooling source: Abstracted from, and returned to, River Medway

Power generation
- Units operational: 2 x 228 MW
- Make and model: GE 9FA
- Nameplate capacity: 660 MW

External links
- Website: www.ssethermal.com/flexible-generation/operational/medway/
- Commons: Related media on Commons

Medway Power Station is a 735 megawatts gas-fired combined cycle gas turbine (CCGT) power station on the Isle of Grain in Kent adjacent to the River Medway, about 44 miles east of London. It started to supply electricity to the national grid in 1995.

== History ==
Medway Power Limited (MPL) was incorporated in September 1990. It is a joint venture company originally comprising Arlington, Virginia-based AES Corporation (trading as AES Electric) (25%) and the RECs SEEBOARD (37.5%) and Southern Electric (37.5%) (became SSE in 1998). In April 1992 MPL awarded a design, procurement and construction contract to a consortium of Europower Development Ltd and TVB Power Ltd. The contract called for a turnkey 660 MW combined cycle electricity generating plant, deliverable by 1 August 1995.

The station was built by Marubeni (Japanese), Tarmac and Kansas City-based Black & Veatch. The station is run by Scottish & Southern Energy under the name Medway Power Ltd. It was commissioned in 1995, being . In June 2002, American Electric Power (AEP) sold its SEEBOARD company to eDF, giving eDF 37.5% of the power station. SSE bought the plant from AES and eDF Energy for £242m on 3 October 2003. It is near (west of) to the Grain Power Station and next to the Thamesport.

== The Site ==
The station is on an 11 acre (4.45 ha) site, above the 200 year flood plain. There is a requirement that the noise at the perimeter must not exceed 65 dBA. The three turbines are contained within an acoustic enclosure in a containment building. The two exhaust stacks are 65 m tall. Stack emissions are limited to 45 ppm NOx. Cooling water is abstracted from the Medway and chlorinated. Water discharges are monitored and treated prior to discharge.

== Specification ==
Medway power station is a CCGT-type power station that runs on natural gas. It has two General Electric Frame 9 (9001F) gas turbines. The exhaust gas from these reaches two Nooter Eriksen heat recovery steam generators. The steam from these powers one General Electric steam turbine.

=== Main plant ===
The operating parameters of the main generating plant are as follows.

Medway power station main plant specifications
Parameter	Value
Combustion turbine generators (CGT)
Manufacturer	General Electric
Model	MS9001FA
Type	Advanced Aero Engine
Number of	2
Combustion chambers	18
Firing temperature	1,288°C
CGT output	228 MW at 11°C
CGT heat rate	10,180 kJ/kWh
CGT efficiency	35%
Steam turbine generator (STG)
Manufacturer	Nooter/Ericsen
Type	Natural circulation, triple pressure, reheat type HRSG
Number of	2
Exhaust gases	Vented to 65 m high steel stacks at 113°C
STG output	247 MW
STG heat rate	7,934 kJ/kWh
STG efficiency	88.7% HP isentropic, 91.8% IP/LP isentropic
Net output available	682 MW
Net heat rate	6,800 kJ/kWh
Net plant efficiency	53%
Generators
Manufacturer	GE
Model	GE 324S
Rating	291 MVA / 15,000 V at 0.85 power factor
Type	Hydrogen cooled

During a major upgrade project in 2012 the power station benefitted from the GE DLN 2.6 install as well as an upgrade to the excitation and turbine control system. Currently the power station operates as a two-shifting plant with approximately 20MW of black start capacity.

=== Ancillary plant ===
Specification of the ancillary plant is as shown in the table.

Medway power station ancillary plant specifications
Parameter	Value
Step up transformers
Rating	290 MVA at 15 kV/420 kV
Manufacturer	GEC-Alsthom
Number	3
Ancillary supply	Two 20 MVA transformers for auxiliary services
Cooling plant
Manufacturer	Hamon
Type	Open wet mechanical cooling tower
Construction	12 cell mechanical ventilation
Flowrate	612,000 litres per minute
Design condition	11°C, 80% humidity
Heat rejection	1.614 × 10^{9} kJ/h heat rejection
Condenser
Manufacturer	Senlor Thermal
Type	Surface condenser
Condensing rate	655,000 kg/h using cooling water at 21°C
Back pressure main steam	41 mm Hg A on steam turbine at 538°C at 97 barA
Back pressure reheat	335°C at 28 barA for hot reheat; 260°C at 6.7 barA
Demineraliser
Manufacturer	Glegg
Type	Two train two bed
Capacity	4,670 l/min (maximum NOx control water injection when running on fuel oil)
Feed water deaerator
Operating pressure	150 mm Hg A
	Water storage tank
Fuel gas heater
Manufacturer	Graham/Crane
Type	Water-to-gas heat exchanger
Number	2
Temperature rise	27°C to 150°C
Auxiliary cooling
Manufacturer	Allfa-Laval
Type	Plate heat exchangers
Number	3
Service	Cool auxiliary cooling loop; turbine lube oil; Generator coolers
Metallurgy	Titanium for saline cooling water
Lube oil
Reservoir	30,280 l (8,000 gals)
Equipment	Pumps; filters; heat exchangers
Fuel oil
Equipment	Dual filters; 3 x 50 % pumps; 2 x atomising air compressors
Control system
Manufacturer	Bailey
Type	Distributed control and information system (DCIS)
Facilities	Operator interface with turbines; control outputs to generators; Operator control functions; Control of equipment and process parameters

== See also ==
- Seabank Power Station
- Grain power station
- Kingsnorth power station
- Damhead Creek power station
