= Listed buildings in the Isle of Grain =

Civil Parish in Kent, England

Isle of Grain is a village and civil parish in the unitary authority of Medway in Kent, England. It contains one grade I and six grade II listed buildings that are recorded in the National Heritage List for England.

This list is based on the information retrieved online from Historic England.

== Key ==
Grade	Criteria
I	Buildings that are of exceptional interest
II*	Particularly important buildings of more than special interest
II	Buildings that are of special interest

== Listing ==
Name	Grade	Location	Type	Completed (Note: The date given is the date used by Historic England as significant for the initial building or that of an important part in the structure's description.)	Date designated	Grid ref. (Note: The grid reference is based on the British national grid reference system, sometimes known as OSGB36, used by the Ordnance Survey.) Geo-coordinates	Notes	Entry number (Note: The "List Entry Number" is a unique number assigned to each listed building and scheduled monument by Historic England.)	Image	Wikidata
Grain Tower	II				14 November 1986	TQ8987076038; 51°27′05″N 0°43′52″E		1204520	Grain Tower More images	Q20711966
The London Stone, Yantlet Creek	II				6 May 2015	TQ8609478555; 51°28′31″N 0°40′42″E		1424771	Upload Photo	Q26677135
White House Farmhouse	II				14 November 1986	TQ8885076146; 51°27′10″N 0°43′00″E		1204482	Upload Photo	Q26499921
World War II Anti-tank Obstacles on the Foreshore	II				24 February 2009	TQ8883277147; 51°27′42″N 0°43′01″E		1393145	Upload Photo	Q26672332
Church of St James	I	High Street			21 November 1966	TQ8887476789; 51°27′31″N 0°43′02″E		1085755	Church of St James More images	Q17533103
The Hogarth Inn	II	High Street			21 November 1966	TQ8861276588; 51°27′25″N 0°42′48″E		1336496	Upload Photo	Q26620984
Grain Crossing Signal Box	II	Kent			12 July 2013	TQ8631375286; 51°26′45″N 0°40′47″E		1415162	Grain Crossing Signal Box More images	Q26676433

== See also ==
- Grade I listed buildings in Kent
- Grade II* listed buildings in Kent

== Sources ==
- Newman, John (2012) [1969], Kent: West and the Weald, The Buildings of England, New Haven and London: Yale University Press, ISBN 978-0-300-18509-6
