= Kingsnorth (Medway) =

Coordinates: 51°25′22″N 0°35′41″E

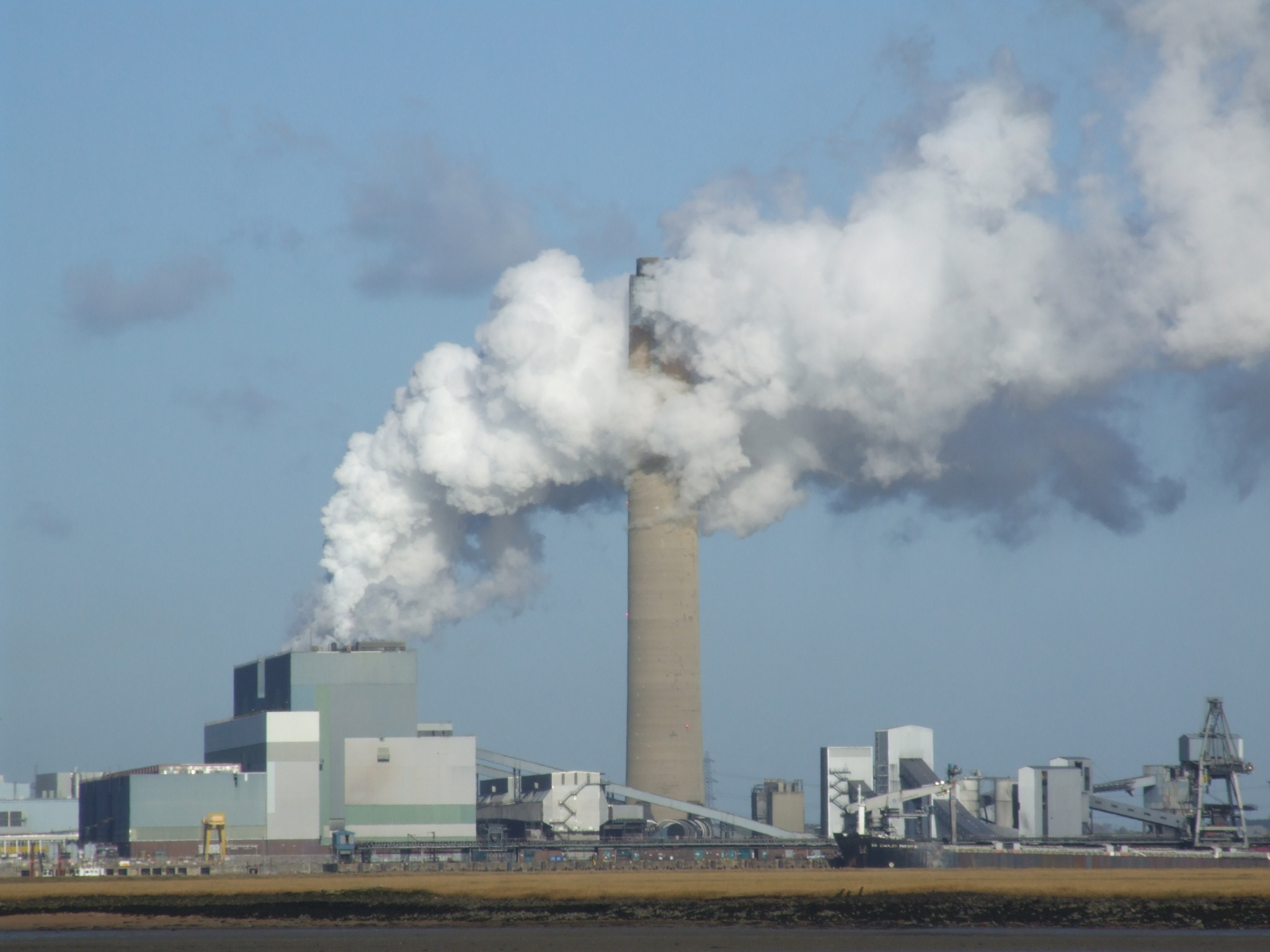
The now-decommissioned Kingsnorth Power Station

Kingsnorth is a place in Kent, England, on the south side of the Hoo Peninsula. It is distinct from the village of Kingsnorth, also in Kent, near Ashford. The nearest village is Hoo St Werburgh and the nearest town Rochester, Kent.

Kingsnorth is the location of the recently decommissioned Kingsnorth power station. It was the location of an airship base, RNAS Kingsnorth, during the First World War.
