= High Halstow NNR =

Nature reserve in Kent, England

Coordinates: 51°27′25″N 0°33′43″E

- Site of Special Scientific Interest
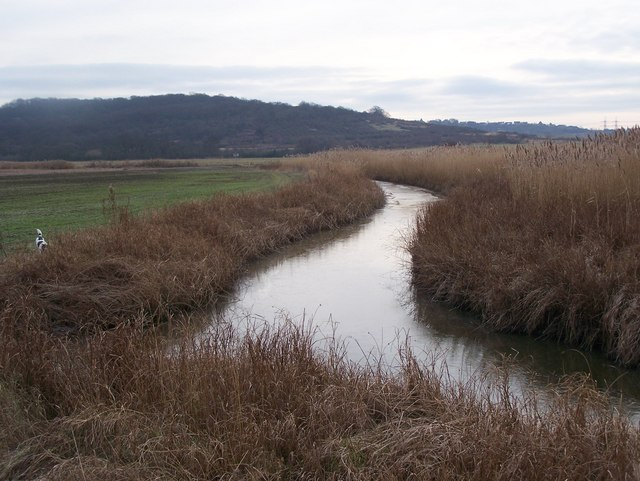
- Location of High Halstow NNR.
- Area of search: Kent
- Grid reference: TQ781763
- Interest: Biological, ornithological
- Area: 129.7 acres (52.5 ha)
- Notification date: 1951

High Halstow National Nature Reserve is on the Hoo Peninsula north of Chatham. It is also part of the Northwood Hill Royal Society for the Protection of Birds Reserve (which is 270 hectares of grazing marsh, woodland and farmland). It was declared a National Nature Reserve in 1951.

The reserve and the woodland lies on the hill to the north of the village of High Halstow.

The woodland, is situated on London Clay, comprises large oak trees and hawthorn scrub, with several sycamore trees. English elm was formerly abundant but has largely been killed by Dutch elm disease. The woodland has a diverse flora with over 200 plants recorded, including trees and shrubs. It is also noted for its diversity of butterflies. A number of rare moths have been recorded at the site. The sloe carpet (Aleucis distinctata), least carpet (Idaea vulpinaria) and a colony of the white-letter hairstreak butterfly have been noted on the reserve. Also nine species of dragonfly have also been recorded in the reserve. The reserve is also home to a flock of nightingales. Also the UK's largest and most famous colonies of little egrets, they have been nesting at the site since 2000, reaching approximately 93 pairs by 2007.

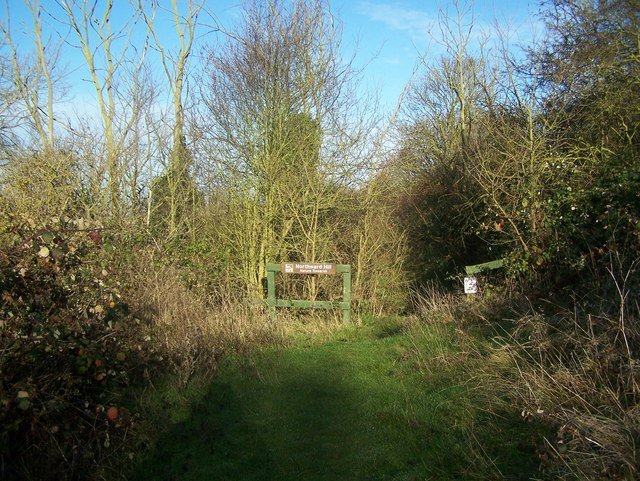
Entrance to the reserve

The reserve may be visited either from (grid ref TR220606) the carpark off Northwood Avenue, to the South-of the woodland. Or from Buckland Farm (the RSPCA Farm and carpark), to west of the woodland. The reserve has a nature trail with attractive sea views and long distance views of the River Medway.

The Saxon Shore Way long distance path passes through the reserve between Cooling and High Halstow.

== Smuggling ==
The wooded hill has been used by smugglers in the early 18th century. One documented tale was recorded in 1728. A couple of men from Medway crossed the English Channel in February 1726. The men smuggled over 400 pounds (180 kg) of tea from Ostend, as well as a few yards of calico and a few silk handkerchiefs on a small ship called The Sloweley. Once they landed on the Kent shore, they hid the goods in the woodland on Northward Hill before later moving it to Chalk church.
