= London Thamesport =

Container and bulk port in England

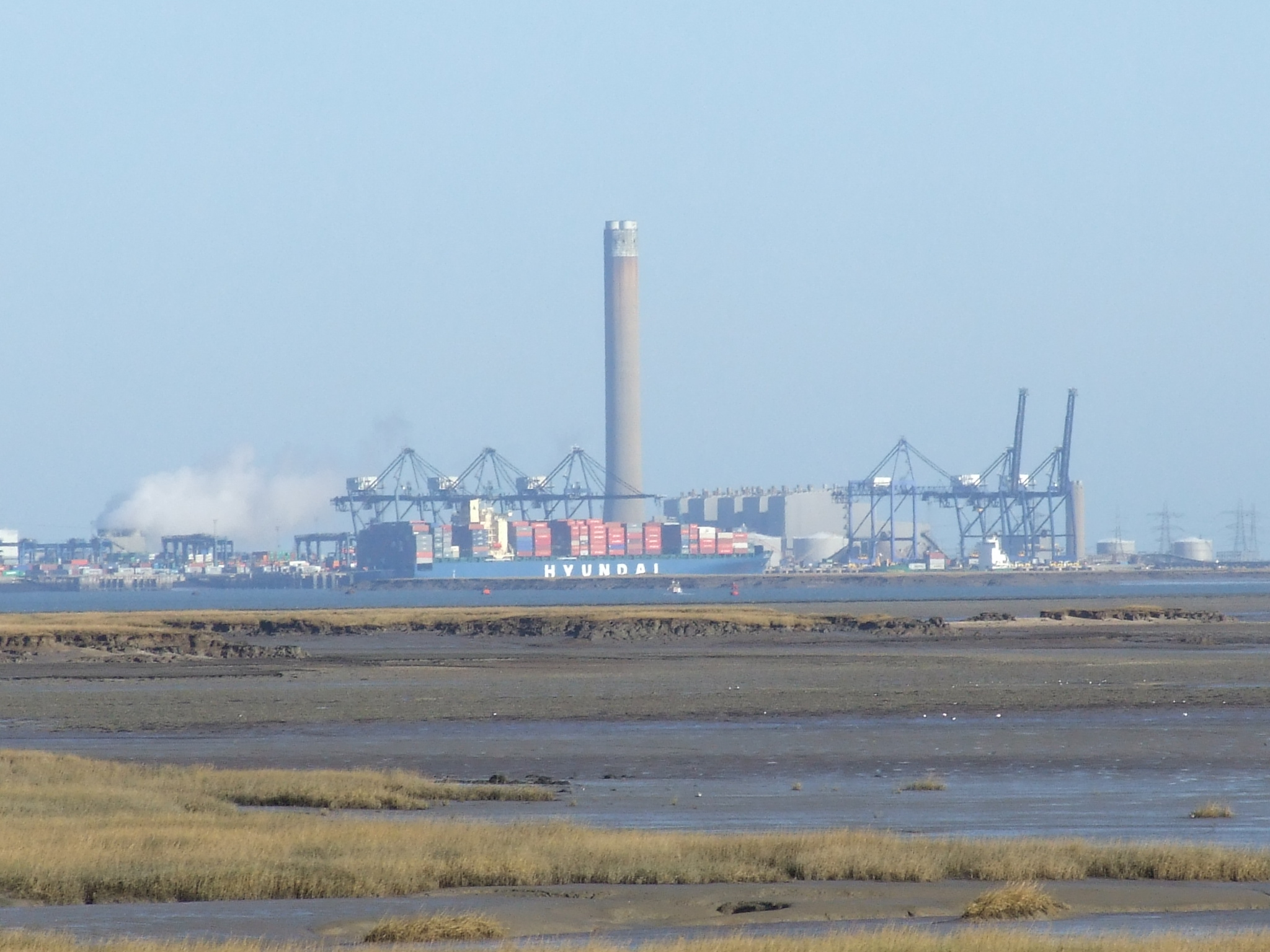
- London Thamesport in 2008, seen from Gillingham over the River Medway estuary
- Interactive map of London Thamesport

Location
- Country: United Kingdom
- Location: London
- Coordinates: 51°26′25″N 0°41′15″E
- UN/LOCODE: GBTHP

Details
- Opened: 1990 (Container operations)
- Owned by: Hutchison Port Holdings
- Type of harbour: Deep water
- No. of berths: 2 container, 1 bulk
- Draft depth: 12.5 metres (41 ft) maximum

Statistics
- Website www.londonthamesport.co.uk

London Thamesport (formerly just "Thamesport") is a small container and bulk seaport on the River Medway. It is located on the Isle of Grain, in the Medway unitary authority district of the English county of Kent.

== History ==
=== Kent Oil Refinery ===
In 1953, the Anglo-Persian Oil Company opened a large oil refinery, Kent Refinery, on the south of the Isle of Grain. A fuel depot with an attached port had existed there since 1928. From 1953, over ten million tons of crude oil were processed annually on the 4 km^{2} (1.5 sq mi) site. This led to the establishment of the oil-fired power station at Grain and dual-fuel capable Kingsnorth. In practice, Kingsnorth used coal. The refinery was closed on 27 August 1982, and work was transferred to other BP locations. The plant was taken over by British Gas plc (at that time still state owned), which used a small part of the site as Grain LNG Terminal for the storage of liquefied natural gas. Three-quarters of the site remained unused.

=== Channel Tunnel segment manufacturing ===
During the construction of the Channel Tunnel, segments to line the tunnel from the British side were made on the site that is now Thamesport, before being delivered by railway to the site at Shakespeare Cliff, near Dover. As there was hardly any room at the site itself, the site on the Isle of Grain was chosen because of the links to the ships from Scotland delivering aggregate. Trains full of segments left the factory each day, travelling on the Hundred of Hoo Railway on the island before taking a circuitous route avoiding steep gradients before arriving at Shakespeare Cliff.

=== Container port ===
In 1987 British Gas submitted plans to use 0.87 km^{2} (0.34 sq mi) of the disused refinery site as a container port. Building began in 1989. The risk capital financing of the £150 million project, named Thamesport, took place through the operating company Thames Estuary Terminals Ltd., later Thamesport Ltd. By March 1990 the enterprise had a capacity of approximately 360,000 TEU per year.

=== Land access ===
Land access to Thamesport was at first only by road. In time the railway line from Gravesend to the Isle of Grain was to be used. A goods station with track and transshipment facilities was developed at Thamesport. A government subsidy of £1.8 million was received. It started operating in January 1992 but the last container train ran in 2013.

=== Ownership changes ===
By the first half of 1990, the repayment of c. £100 million risk capital put the operator company Thamesport Ltd. into administration. The investment group Rutland Partners LLP acquired 95% of MTS holdings Ltd – the parent company of Thamesport Ltd – in December 1995 for £25 million and took over debts of £27 million. With the new owner, the port was further developed. The capacity increased to approximately 635,000 TEU per year. In 1997, with a turnover of £27.3 million, a profit (before tax) of approximately £2.5 million was made. In February 1998 Rutland Partners LLP sold their interest in MTS holdings Ltd and small navigation company "Maritime Haulage" for £112 million to the Hutchison Whampoa Group. Hutchison Whampoa also operates two other important ports on the British east coast, Felixstowe and Harwich.

=== Deep-water port ===
In 2001 Thamesport was developed into a deep-water port. The harbour basin was dredged to a depth of at least 15.5 metres (8.5 fathoms), and the approach to a minimum depth of 12.5 metres (6.8 fathoms), at a cost of £3.5 million. In June 2008, its name was changed to London Thamesport.

Between 2011 and 2015, Hutchison Whampoa reorganized and merged resulting in the port being owned by Hutchison Port Holdings.

== Facilities ==
The heart of London Thamesport is a 655 metres (2,149 ft) deep water dock. The quay has eight (STS) gantry cranes, and can service vessels with draughts of 14.5 metres (48 ft). The temporary storage facility has capacity for 26,000 TEU; i.e. 13,000 standard containers. The container handling is semi-automatic, as the container tugs are manually operated. 635,000 TEU can be processed annually. In the long-term the capacity could be doubled.

Although site constraints limit the maximum possible length of the quay to only 750 metres (2,500 ft), there is considerable scope for future development at London Thamesport. The majority of this brownfield site (a former oil refinery) remains undeveloped, and Thamesport Interchange has outline planning permission to build 5,000,000 square feet (465,000 m^{2}) of logistics related facilities.

Immediately to the north of London Thamesport is a terminal for the import of aviation fuel (kerosene). London Thamesport will be well-placed if proposals for a new London Airport, either on the Isle of Grain itself, or on the Mayor of London's "Boris Island", come to fruition. (This is unlikely to be a consideration in anything other than the long-term future. In December 2013, the Airports Commission, chaired by Sir Howard Davies, excluded these proposals from its short-list of possible recommendations. The Commission later studied a number of aspects of the 'Inner Thames Estuary Proposal' and announced in July 2014 that it would not be adding any such proposal to its short-list.)

Although the company appears confident of further development and a prosperous future, London Thamesport has been eclipsed by the new and much bigger London Gateway port on the north bank of the Thames. London Gateway is now operational and (as of September 2017) is receiving 17 container ships per day. There are plans for a cement factory on the former container marshalling yard.

== Land traffic ==
=== Road ===
Thamesport is connected to national road network by the A228.

=== Rail ===
The port also has a connection to the single-track, standard-gauge, freight Hundred of Hoo Railway. Two British rail freight companies – DB Cargo UK and Freightliner – operated container services to Thamesport. In the first half of 2005, approximately 25% of traffic to and from Thamesport used the rail link. However, the last container train ran on 6 November 2013.
