= Hydrogen-cooled turbo generator =

Turbo generator with gaseous hydrogen as a coolant

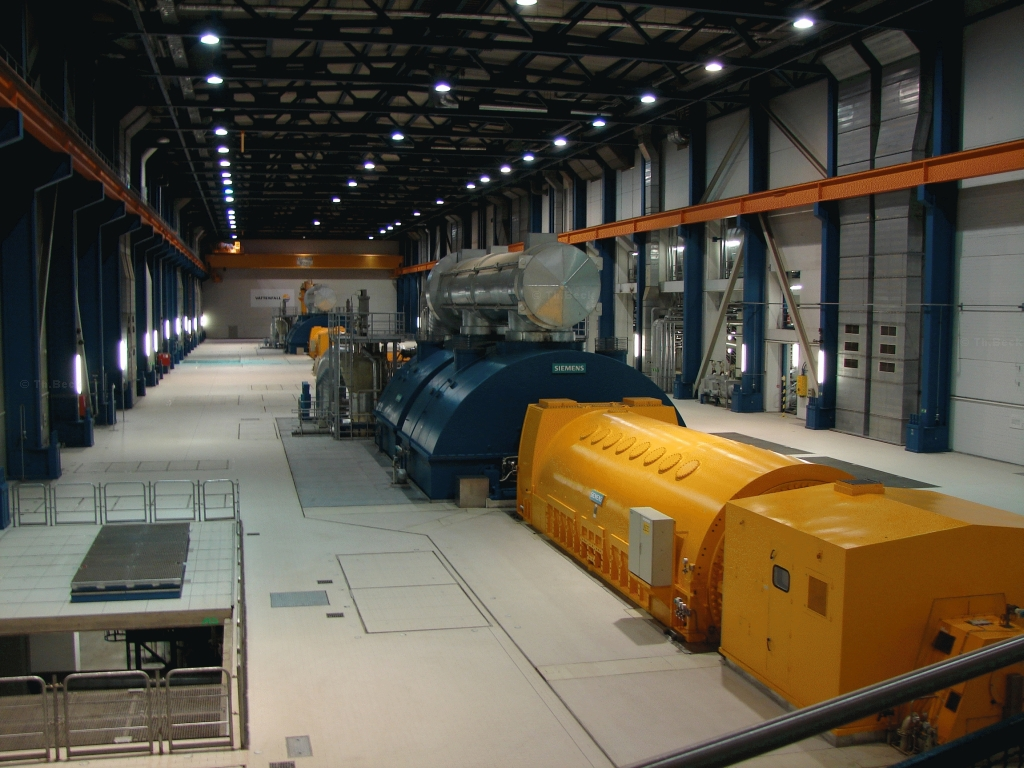
A power plant turbine generator set: A steam turbine (blue) drives an electrical generator (yellow) with an excitation generator (front).

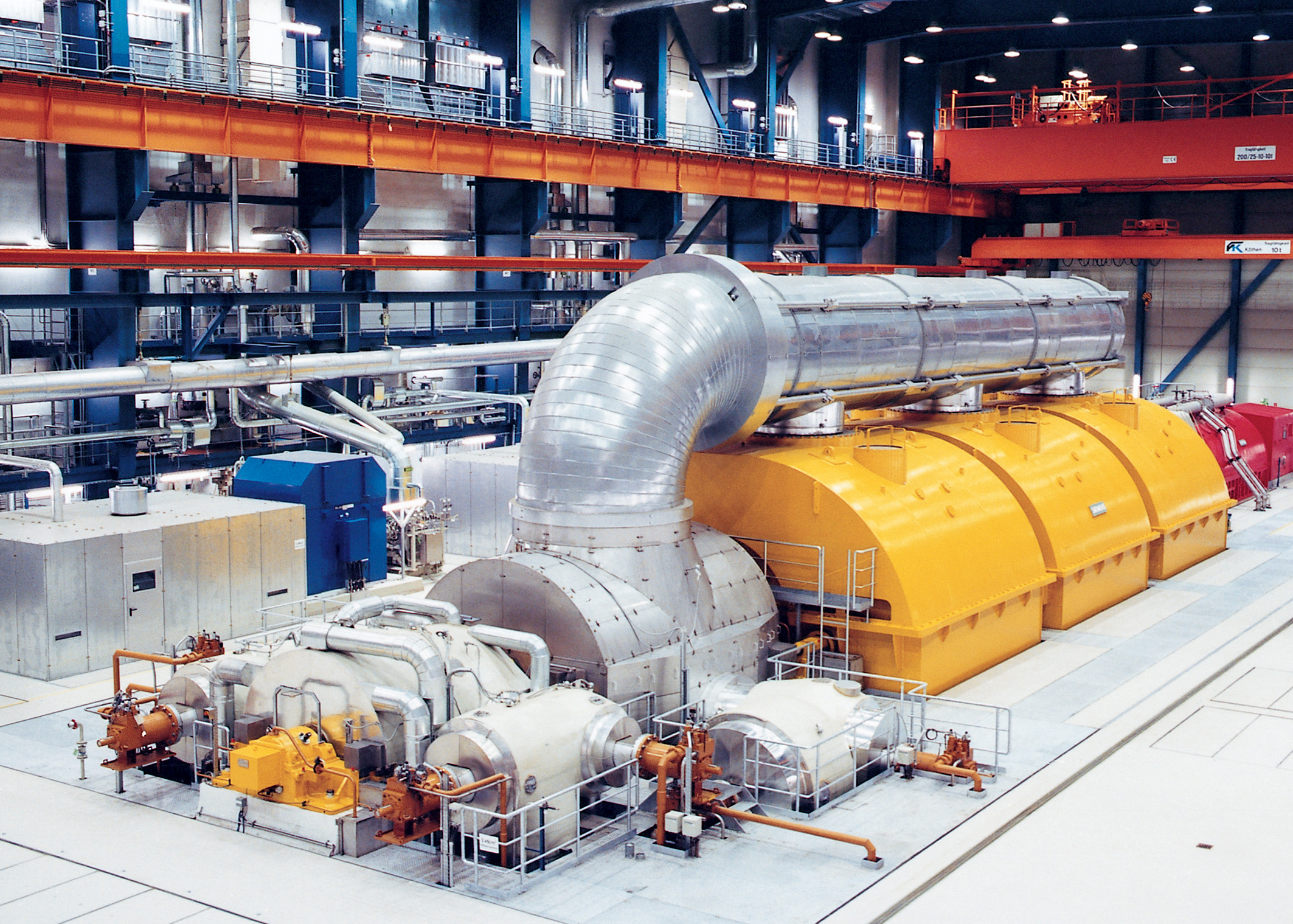
A 500 MW Siemens multi stage steam turbine with generator set (rear, red)

A hydrogen-cooled turbo generator is a turbo generator with gaseous hydrogen as a coolant. Hydrogen-cooled turbo generators are designed to provide a low-drag atmosphere and cooling for single-shaft and combined-cycle applications in combination with steam turbines. Because of the high thermal conductivity and other favorable properties of hydrogen gas, this is the most common type in its field today.

== History ==
Based on the air-cooled turbo generator, gaseous hydrogen first went into service as the coolant of a 30 kV synchronous condenser of the French Midi Railways. The US followed with a turbo generator in October 1937, at the Dayton Power & Light Co. in Dayton, Ohio.

== Design ==
The use of gaseous hydrogen as a coolant is based on its low density, high specific heat, and the highest thermal conductivity (at 0.168 W/(m·K)) of all gases; it is 7 to 10 times better at cooling than air. Another advantage of hydrogen is its easy detection by hydrogen sensors. A hydrogen-cooled generator can be significantly smaller, and therefore less expensive, than an air-cooled one. For stator cooling, water can be used.

Helium with a thermal-conductivity of 0.142 W/(m·K) was considered as coolant as well; however, its high cost hinders its adoption despite its non-flammability.

Generally, three cooling approaches are used. For generators up to 60 MW, air cooling can be used. Between 60 and 450 MW hydrogen cooling is employed. For the highest power generators, up to 1800 MW, hydrogen and water cooling is used; the rotor is hydrogen-cooled, while the stator windings are made of hollow copper tubes cooled by water circulating through them.

The generators produce high voltage; the choice of voltage depends on the tradeoff between demands of electrical insulation and handling high electric current. For generators up to 40 MVA, the voltage is 6.3 kV; large generators with power above 1000 MW generate voltages up to 27 kV; voltages between 2.3 and 30 kV are used depending on the size of the generator. The generated power is sent to a nearby step-up transformer, where it is converted to the electric power transmission line voltage (typically between 115 and 1200 kV).

To control the centrifugal forces at high rotational speeds, the rotor diameter typically does not exceed 1.25 meters; the required large size of the coils is achieved by their length and so the generator is mounted horizontally. Two-pole machines typically operate at 3000 rpm for 50 Hz and 3600 rpm for 60 Hz systems, half of that for four-pole machines.

The turbogenerator also contains a smaller generator producing direct current excitation power for the rotor coil. Older generators used dynamos and slip rings for DC injection to the rotor, but the moving mechanical contacts were subject to wear. Modern generators have the excitation generator on the same shaft as the turbine and main generator; the diodes needed are located directly on the rotor. The excitation current on larger generators can reach 10 kA. The amount of excitation power ranges between 0.5 and 3% of the generator output power.

The rotor usually contains caps or cage made of nonmagnetic material; its role is to provide a low impedance path for eddy currents which occur when the three phases of the generator are unevenly loaded. In such cases, eddy currents are generated in the rotor, and the resulting Joule heating could in extreme cases destroy the generator.

Hydrogen gas is circulated in a closed loop to remove heat from the active parts then it is cooled by gas-to-water heat exchangers on the stator frame. The working pressure is up to 6 bar.

An on-line thermal conductivity detector (TCD) analyzer is used with three measuring ranges. The first range (80–100% H_{2}) is to monitor the hydrogen purity during normal operation. The second (0–100% H_{2}) and third (0–100% of a chosen inert gas, typically CO_{2} or N_{2}) measuring ranges allow safe opening of the turbines for maintenance.

Hydrogen has very low viscosity, a favorable property for reducing drag losses in the rotor. These losses can be significant due to the rotor's high rotational speed. A reduction in the purity of the hydrogen coolant increases windage losses in the turbine due to the associated increase in viscosity and drag. A drop of only a few percent in hydrogen purity can increase windage losses by hundreds of kilowatts in a large generator. Windage losses also increase heat loss in the generator and increase the problem of dealing with the waste heat.

== Operation ==
The absence of oxygen in the atmosphere within significantly reduces damage to the winding insulation from corona discharges; these can be problematic as the generators typically operate at high voltage, often 20 kV.

=== Seal oil system ===
The bearings have to be leak-tight. A hermetic seal, usually a liquid seal, is employed; a turbine oil at pressure higher than the hydrogen inside is typically used. A metal, e.g. brass, ring is pressed by springs onto the generator shaft, the oil is forced under pressure between the ring and the shaft; part of the oil flows into the hydrogen side of the generator, another part to the air side. The oil entrains a small amount of air; as the oil is recirculated, some of the air is carried over into the generator. This causes a gradual air contamination buildup and requires maintaining hydrogen purity.

Scavenging systems are used for this purpose; gas (mixture of entrained air and hydrogen, released from the oil) is collected in the holding tank for the sealing oil, and released into the atmosphere; the hydrogen losses have to be replenished, either from gas cylinders or from on-site hydrogen generators. Degradation of bearings leads to higher oil leaks, which increases the amount of air transferred into the generator. Increased oil consumption can be detected by a flow meter for each bearing.

=== Drying ===
Presence of water in hydrogen has to be avoided, as it causes deterioration of hydrogen's cooling properties, corrosion of the generator parts, and arcing in the high voltage windings, and reduces the lifetime of the generator. A desiccant-based dryer is usually included in the gas circulation loop, typically with a moisture probe in the dryer's outlet, sometimes also in its inlet. Presence of moisture is also indirect evidence of air leaking into the generator compartment. Another option is optimizing the hydrogen scavenging, so the dew point is kept within the generator's specifications. The water is usually introduced into the generator atmosphere as an impurity in the turbine oil; another route is via leaks in water cooling systems.

=== Purging ===
The flammability limits (4–75% of hydrogen in air at normal temperature, wider at high temperatures,), its autoignition temperature at 571 °C, its very low minimum ignition energy, and its tendency to form explosive mixtures with air, require provisions to be made for maintaining the hydrogen content within the generator above the upper or below the lower flammability limit at all times, and other hydrogen safety measures. When the generator is filled with hydrogen, overpressure has to be maintained as inflow of air into the generator could cause a dangerous explosion in its confined space.

The generator enclosure is purged before opening it for maintenance, and before refilling the generator with hydrogen. During shutdown, hydrogen is purged by an inert gas, and then the inert gas is replaced by air; the opposite sequence is used before startup. Carbon dioxide or nitrogen can be used for this purpose, as they do not form combustible mixtures with hydrogen and are inexpensive. Gas purity sensors are used to indicate the end of the purging cycle, which shortens the startup and shutdown times and reduces consumption of the purging gas.

Carbon dioxide is favored as due to the very high density difference it easily displaces the hydrogen. The carbon dioxide is admitted to the bottom of the generator first, pushing the hydrogen out at the top. Then air is admitted to the top, pushing the carbon dioxide out at the bottom. Purging is best done with the generator stopped. If it is done during slow-speed unloaded rotation, the generator fans will mix the gases, greatly increasing the time required to achieve purity.

=== Make-up ===
Hydrogen is often produced on-site using a plant consisting of an array of electrolysis cells, compressors and storage vessels. This reduces the need for storing compressed hydrogen and allows storage in lower pressure tanks, with associated safety benefits and lower costs. Some gaseous hydrogen has to be kept for refilling the generator but it can be also generated on-site.

As technology evolves materials not susceptible to hydrogen embrittlement are used in generator designs. Not doing so can lead to equipment failure from hydrogen embrittlement.

== See also ==
- Timeline of hydrogen technologies
- Precooled jet engine
