= Municipal Borough of Rochester =

Former local government area in Kent, UK

Rochester
- Area
  - 1911/1931: 2,936 acres (11.88 km^{2})
  - 1961: 3,983 acres (16.12 km^{2})
- Population
  - 1911: 31,384
  - 1931: 31,193
  - 1961: 50,143
- History
  - Created: 1835
  - Abolished: 1974
  - Succeeded by: Medway
- Status: Municipal borough, City
- Government: Rochester City Corporation
  - HQ: Guildhall, High Street, Rochester

Rochester was a local government district with the status of borough and city in Kent, England, from 1835 to 1974.

Rochester held city status from an early time and was an ancient borough. The municipal corporation was reformed by the Municipal Corporations Act 1835.

It included the following civil parishes:

- Part of Chatham
- Part of Frindsbury (became Frindsbury Intra in 1894)
- Rochester Castle Precincts
- Part of Rochester St Margaret (became part of St Margaret Intra in 1894)
- Rochester St Nicholas
- Part of Strood (became Strood Intra in 1894)
- Part of Wouldham (became part of St Margaret Intra in 1894)

In 1934 all parts of the city formed a civil parish of Rochester. Parts of Frindsbury Extra and the abolished Strood Extra parishes from Strood Rural District were gained by the new civil parish and the city.

It was abolished in 1974 and became part of the larger district of Medway. Initially city status was maintained by charter trustees for the former area of the borough. Following the renaming of the new district to Rochester-upon-Medway in 1979, city status was conferred on the entire district in 1982.
