= Wainscott, Kent =

Village in Kent, England

Coordinates: 51.411530°N 0.511430°E

Wainscott
- Location within Kent
- Unitary authority: Medway
- Ceremonial county: Kent
- Region: South East
- Country: England
- Sovereign state: United Kingdom
- Post town: Rochester
- Postcode district: ME2, ME3
- Dialling code: 01634
- Police: Kent
- Fire: Kent
- Ambulance: South East Coast
- UK Parliament: Rochester and Strood

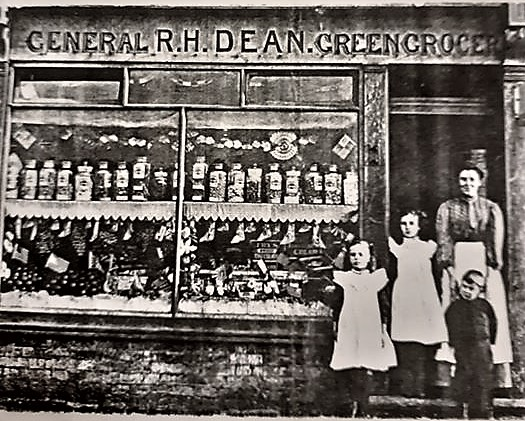
R H Dean Greengrocery, 1 Dickens Terrace, Wainscott circa 1900

Wainscott is a small village in Rochester, in Kent, England. It is in the civil parish of Frindsbury Extra, in the Medway Unitary Authority, that is Medway Council. By 1950 it had been absorbed into the neighbouring residential areas of Strood. Wainscott itself is located immediately next to Frindsbury, and is surrounded by Mockbeggar Farm, Noke Street Farm, Islingham Farm and other agricultural land, Great Chattenden Wood, Towerhill Woods and Cockham Woods. It is speculated that the name is derived from the Old English meaning Wagonner Cot or Wagon Shed.

== History ==
Archaeological excavations during April 2007 to June 2007 on the north-eastern edge of Wainscott revealed evidence for human activity dating from the early prehistoric through to the Early Modern Period, and provided important new evidence for Bronze Age, Romano-British and Saxon settlements. Two Roman enclosures existed, one of which aligned with a metaled road with ditches on either side; coins also proved occupation during the Romano-British period, but after that there seems to have been a quiet period of a few centuries.

Pottery dated to the late 6th/7th century signals a new period of occupation, with two pit-houses and a number of other enclosures. There is evidence of small-scale industry. Finds from the mid-to late Saxon period evidence "a settlement of some status" at that time.

By the Late Saxon period the estates of Kent were divided up into lathes and hundreds. The Wainscott area lay in the Lathe of Aylesford and the Hundred of Shamwell. In the late eleventh century the hamlet of Wainscott may have been established by this time at the junction of the crossroads, although there is no written evidence for it. Its name probably means ‘wagon shelter’, suggesting a subordinate role in the larger estate of Frindsbury. At the time of the Domesday survey in 1086 the manor of Frandesberie (Frindsbury) was held by the bishop of Rochester. It had been assessed at 10 sulungs (971 ha) in 1066. There was a separate manor of Wainscott which had emerged from the parent manor of Frindsbury by the early 14th century. It was also called ‘Parlabien’s Yoke’ (or ‘Perleben’s Yoke’) after the family which held it at this time. It afterwards descended to the Colepeper family, which held it until the late 16th century. In the years 1494–1504 it was divided into two halves, and court records survive for one of these moieties. However, very little business was transacted beyond the collection of fines from tenants who failed to attend. If the extent of the manor was really one yoke, it would not have been more than 50 acres (c. 20.2 ha). The fields underlying the north excavation area to the north of Hoo Road were in the manor, as were a series of smaller fields along the south side of the road as far as the stream. Beyond the stream to the north-east were the fields of Islingham manor; to the south of the road lay parts of the manors of Frindsbury and Chattenden. At the dissolution of the monasteries in the 1530s, the manor of Frindsbury with its appendages was confiscated from Rochester Priory by Henry VIII, but was subsequently passed on to the Dean and Chapter of Rochester in 1542. The manor of Wainscott was sold in the late 16th century, and passed by a series of descents and sales to John Boghurst, who held it in the late 18th century. He still held a court leet and a court baron for the manor at this time. Post-medieval and modern maps and documents indicate that the area of the site comprised a number of agricultural fields, both within Islingham and Wainscott manors.

Tilemaking at Wainscott A map dated 1711 shows this hamlet as consisting of a house and a few cottages known as Windscott, the name probably referring to a collection of cottages in an exposed or windy place. The house was called 'White Horse' and, since the hamlet was situated on a crossroads on the road to the Isle of Grain, it may well have been an inn. By 1838, the name had been corrupted to Wainscott and a local pottery industry was already in existence by 1842. The main works was the Wainscott Pottery owned by a Henry Hone and next to this was a smaller operation owned by Thomas Fox. The reason for their location is easily explained by investigation of the local land ownership at this time. Nearby at Four Elms Hill were two clay pits owned by a William Beadle, who was something of an entrepreneur. Beadle also owned the land to the immediate east of the road in Wainscott and it was here that the potteries were set up. Thus, not only did he sell the clay to the potteries but he also got the rent from their premises as well as the adjacent workers’ cottages. It must have been quite a monopoly for him as well as being rather lucrative. Both potteries produced tiles for the expanding building industry and some may have found their way to London together with the local brick trade. The tithe records also list an Edward Hone (limeburner at Upnor) and a John Hone (brickmaker at Bill Street). It is not known if they were related to Henry Hone but it is possible that this was an example of a family diversifying into all aspects of supplying the building industry. Henry later went on to own the Kings Arms pub and John the Old Oak Inn. By 1858, there had been a change of proprietors and the potteries were now owned by Thomas Baker and Jesse Clark Foster. It is likely that the larger premises belonged to the latter since, in 1877, Foster bought the clay pits from the Executors of Beadle who had by then died. With this assumption, Baker must have sold out after a few years to Messrs Charlton & Matthews since, in the book "Industrial Medway" by J.M. Preston, they are mentioned in an advertisement dated 1868. This reference is interesting since it shows the diverse range of products being produced i.e. oven & paving bricks and tiles; pan, plain & ridge tiles; sanitary & land drainage pipes; chimney, flower & paint pots; garden & edging tiles. In the meantime, Foster continued to expand his pottery and took his son Theophilus into partnership in 1867. In 1871 they were shown as brick and tile manufacturers but there is no evidence that they had the necessary equipment at their clay pits to make bricks on site. Since it was a competitive business locally, it is more likely that they produced specialised bricks at their premises. In 1882 they sold out to Francis Hazell, who produced bricks, tiles, drainpipes and chimney & garden pots. The 1862 Ordnance Survey map shows a draw well next to each of the potteries. Whereas these may only be water wells, there is also the possibility that they were chalk wells. The census of 1871 lists a William Eloine of Wainscott who was described as an ‘excavator’. This is a peculiar term since men who dug clay were normally described as merely labourers and it seems to imply extraction at depth. He could of course have been a local well sinker but, again, the latter term is usually used in census job descriptions. One clue is given in an article on deneholes written by F.C.J. Spurrell in 1882, when he mentions a denehole (properly termed a chalkwell) which was then being used at Plumstead for a tile works. It is known that a small quantity of chalk was added to normal bricks to prevent shrinkage during firing and possibly this was also done in the case of tiles. If products of a yellow colour were required, like the Stock Bricks, a greater proportion of chalk would have to be added to get the colouration. Thus, it is possible that the local tile works had chalkwells on the premises to obtain their own supplies of chalk.

== Access ==
Wainscott is now bypassed to the east by the 'Wainscott Eastern Bypass' and to the north by 'Wainscott Northern Bypass'. These roads, both named the A289, lead traffic from the A2 to the Medway Tunnel. These two roads meet at the 'Four Elms Roundabout', where the A228 climbs 'Four Elms Hill' and onto the Hoo Peninsula, where the A228 becomes the Ratcliffe Highway, that then passes the Deangate Ridge Golf Club (closed)on the left and takes the second roundabout exit on the Main Road into Hoo itself. At the top of Four Elms Hill is the village of Chattenden.

Wainscott is situated within the parish of Frindsbury Extra.

== Retail ==
Wainscott has a Co-operative Food, a Premier Stores paper shop, a barbers (Wainscott Barbers), a fish and chip shop (The Golden Fish Bar), a Chinese takeaway (Dynasty Chinese) and two pubs (The Stag and The Crafty Fox Micro Pub). The Wainscott Working Mens Club closed on 28 February 2014.
