= Frindsbury =

Village in Kent, England

Coordinates: 51.3999°N 0.5064°E

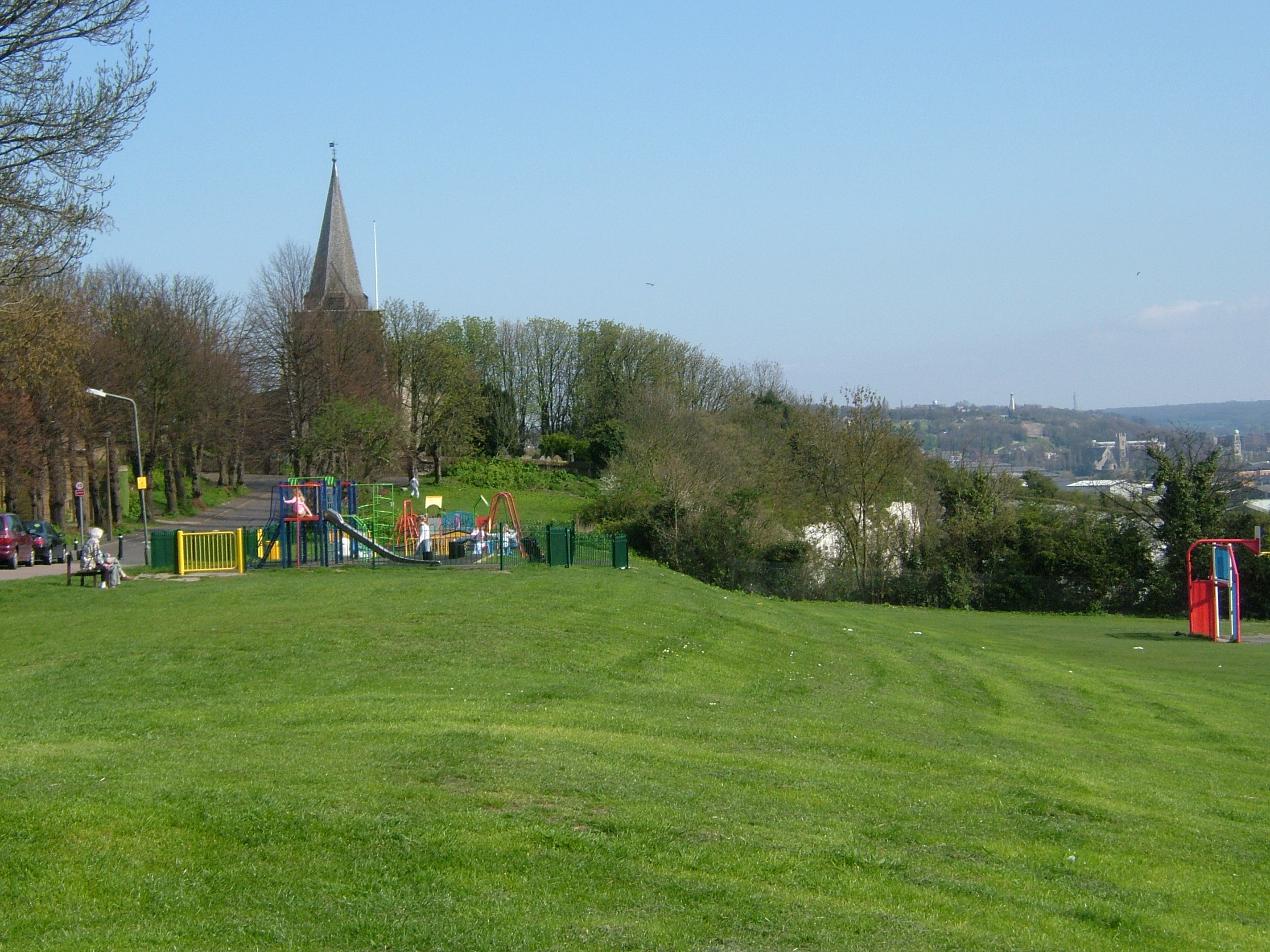
- Church Green, Frindsbury

- Location within Kent
- Population: 5,500
- OS grid reference: TQ744697
- Unitary authority: Medway
- Ceremonial county: Kent
- Region: South East
- Country: England
- Sovereign state: United Kingdom
- Post town: ROCHESTER
- Postcode district: ME2
- Dialling code: 01634
- Police: Kent
- Fire: Kent
- Ambulance: South East Coast
- UK Parliament: Rochester and Strood

Frindsbury (Note: Referred to in some historic sources as Frinsbury.) is part of the Medway Towns conurbation in Kent, southern England. It lies on the opposite side of the River Medway to Rochester, and at various times in its history has been considered fully or partially part of the City of Rochester. Frindsbury today is part of the town of Strood and covers the most northern part of the town. Frindsbury refers to both a parish and a manor. Within the civil parish of Frindsbury Extra are the villages of Frindsbury, Wainscott, and Upnor. Frindsbury was also the name given to an electoral ward in the City of Rochester that straddled the parishes of Frindsbury and Strood.

== Topology ==
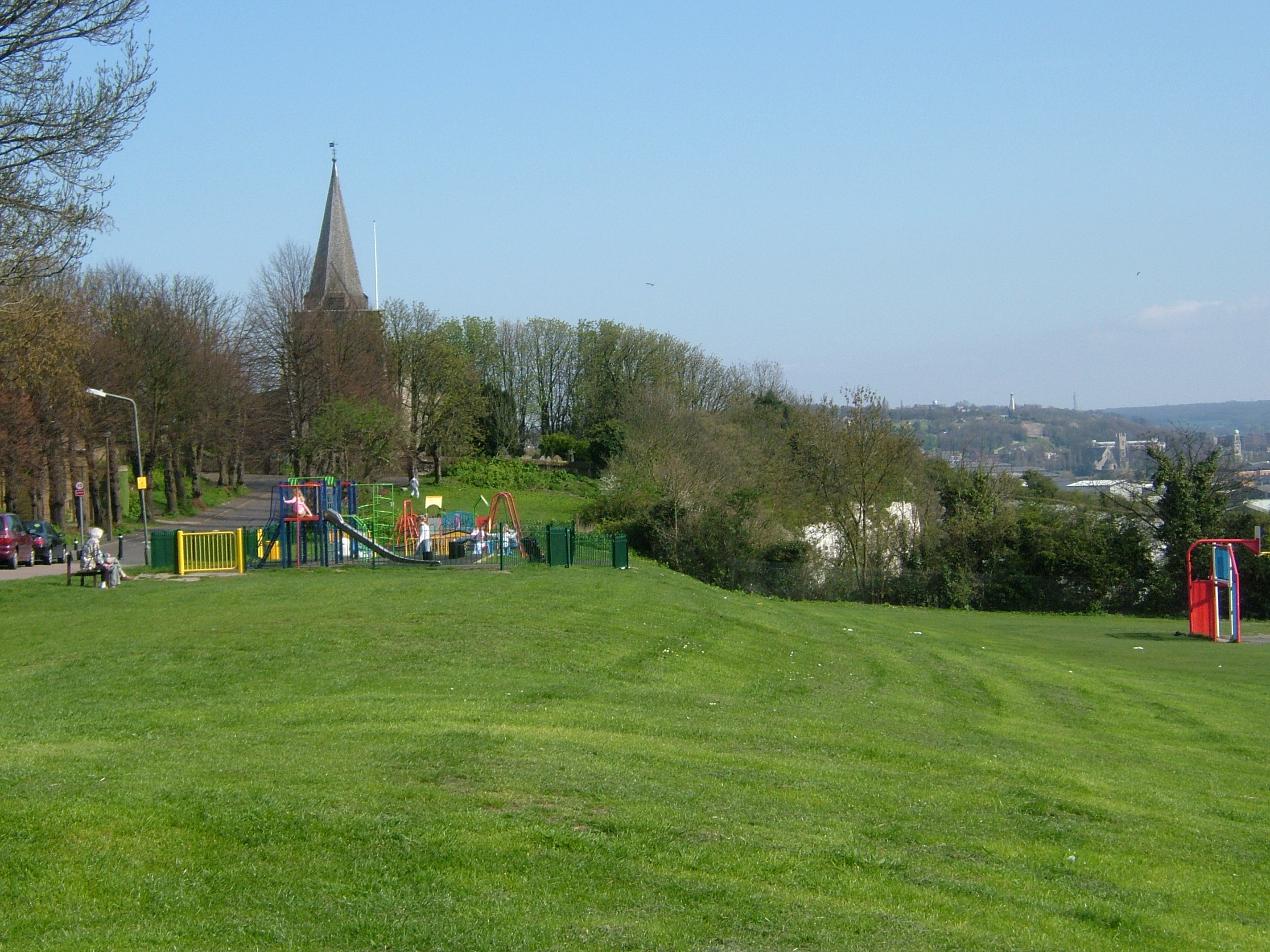
Frindsbury Church from Church Green, showing behind the chalk cliffs formed by quarrying. In the far distance is Chatham, showing how closely the Medway Towns are interlinked.

Frindsbury lies on the northwest bank of the Medway at its lowest bridging point. After a narrow but marshy coastal strip, the landmass rises steeply to plateau at about 100 ft (30 m). This was a sheet of chalk covered by brickearth covered with topsoil. Over the last two millennia, much of this was stripped away, or mined, so the contours have constantly changed. Through the centre of this ran a shallow valley carrying a stream draining the Hoo Peninsula behind, through Islingham to Whitewall Creek where it entered the River Medway. This water flow formed a riverine meander upstream and a build up of alluvium pushing 1,000 yds into the River Medway. Though rarely more than 25 feet (7.6 m) in height, the Frindsbury Peninsula became the centre of many industries. At the Strood end the coastal salt marsh became 600 yds wide. There is evidence of Roman piling so they could build a roadway, Watling Street, from Strood Hill across the salt marsh to the Medway which they bridged. At that time Strood was part of Frindsbury. The impenetrable nature and the steepness of the topography here influenced the route of the East Kent Railway (EKR), which became the London, Chatham and Dover Railway (LCDR) on 1 August 1859.

== History ==
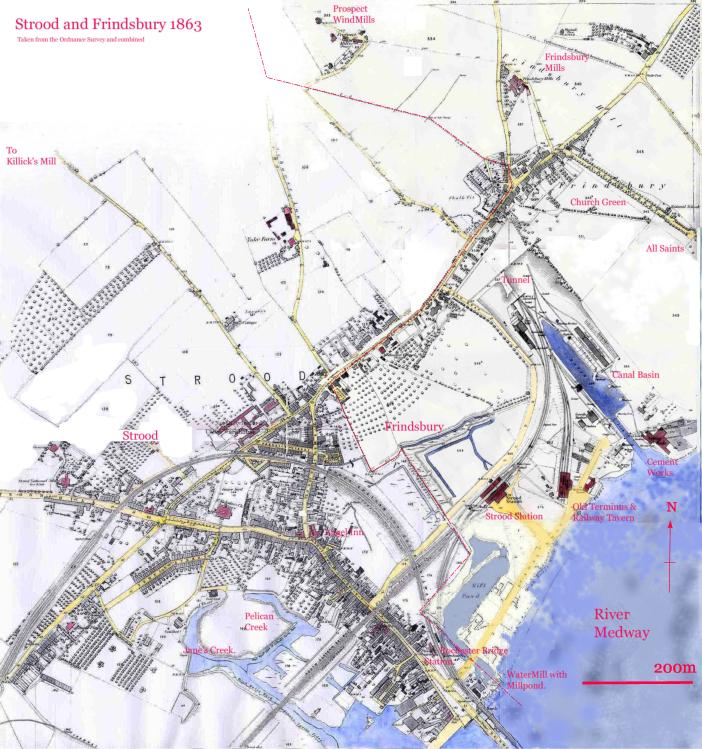
Here we see how Strood the marshy place, relates to Frindsbury. The station, canal basin and all the wharves downstream of the Watermill were in Frindsbury. The steep slopes are caused by the chalk pits. Note also the undrained land between the railway, and Frindsbury Hill, and the lack of houses.

The word Frindsbury comes from Old English, freondesburh, meaning a stronghold held by a friend or ally. Recorded documented names of the parish include Freondesbrei (764), Freondesberia (c975), Frandesberie (1086), Fryndesbury (1610). The main parish church, All Saints, was built on the hill. There was a chapel of ease at Strood (St Nicholas'), where Watling Street left the firm ground to run over the marshes to the Medway bridge. Strood was promoted to a full parish in 1193 by Gilbert Glanvill, Bishop of Rochester.

=== Prehistory ===
The remains of a large elephant skeleton (palaeoloxodon antiquus) were excavated in 1911 at Upnor. In 1925, evidence of a palaeolithic flint works in the quarry to the east of All Saints' Church was reported. The find included over 4000 stone tools dating from 300,000 BP, including hand axes, large flint flakes, core pieces, and quartzite hammer stones.

Excavations in 2021 at the site of the new Maritime Academy school produced Palaeolithic remains, including several handaxes, two of which could be classed as 'giant handaxes'. The artefacts were recovered from fluvial deposits in the Medway Valley and are thought to date from the Marine Isotope Stage 9 interglacial. The larger flint handaxe at 29.6 cm long makes it the third largest known to be found in Britain. The size of the handaxe and its distinctive symmetrical elongated tapering tip is typical of a type of handaxe known as a ficron. (Note: Senior Archaeologist Letty Ingrey (UCL Institute of Archaeology), said: "We describe these tools as 'giants' when they are over 22 cm long and we have two in this size range. The biggest, a colossal 29.5 cm in length, is one of the longest ever found in Britain. 'Giant handaxes' like this are usually found in the Thames and Medway regions and date from over 300,000 years ago. "These handaxes are so big it’s difficult to imagine how they could have been easily held and used. Perhaps they fulfilled a less practical or more symbolic function than other tools, a clear demonstration of strength and skill. While right now, we aren’t sure why such large tools were being made, or which species of early human were making them, this site offers a chance to answer these exciting questions".)

A Bronze Age sword was discovered at Upnor.

Michael Nightingale in 1953 argued that there was a Roman Villa at Frindsbury to produce food to supply the garrison at Durobrivæ, modern Rochester, Kent. The foundations of the road leading from this villa to the bridge were discovered in 1819 at the canal dock. Further excavation by Tingey in 1888 produced several artefacts, including a bronze statue of Cupid 5.25" high.

=== Middle Ages ===
Bishop Eardulf of Rochester obtained Freandisbery and Wicham in 747. Notwithstanding this in 764, King Offa of Mercia (as overlord) and Sigered (the petty king of this part of Kent) granted 20 sulungs of land at Aeslingham in Freodesbrei to Bishop Eardulf of Rochester. In 778, King Egbert gave more land to the Bishop. Following the Danish wars or the 9th and 10th century the area was wrested from the church and eventually came under the control of Harold Godwinson. Following Harold's defeat at the Battle of Hastings, William the Conqueror gave the lands to Odo, bishop of Bayeux, Earl of Kent, and William's half brother. Archbishop Lanfranc recovered them again at the Trial of Penenden Heath (c.1072) and restored them to Bishop Gundulf of Rochester. Gundulf was responsible for commencing the rebuilding of Rochester Cathedral and establishing the Benedictine Priory of St Andrew based upon it. He gave the land at Fridsbury to the new priory though insisting they paid an 'exenium' to him or his successors on St Andrew's Day.

The Domesday Book of 1086 records Frindsbury as in the Lathe of Aylesford, in the Hundred of Shamwell. It had been taxed at 10 sulungs before 1066 and then at 7 in 1086. There were 15 carucates of arable land, 5 held by the lord and 11 by the villagers [sic]. It supported 40 villagers, 28 smallholders and 9 slaves. There was a mill taxable at 12 shillings (60p), a church, 40 acres (16 ha) of meadow and woodland for 5 pigs. It was worth £8 before the conquest, but £25 by 1086 with another 10 shillings (50p) for the Bishop. (Note: The same bishop holds FRINDSBURY. It was assessed at 10 sulungs TRE, and now at 7. There is land for 15 ploughs. In demesne are 5 ploughs; and 40 villans with 28 boardars have 11 ploughs. There is a church and 9 slaves, and 1 mill rendering 12s, and 40 acres of meadow, [and] woodland for 5 pigs. TRE and afterwards, it was worth £8; and now £25. What Richard holds in his lowry is worth 10s.)

Bishop Gilbert de Glanvill claimed Frinsdsbury back from the monks "as belonging to the maintenance of his table" in 1185. According to Hasted the bishop succeeded in obtaining the church, but the manor remained in the possession of the monks until the dissolution of the monasteries under Henry VIII in 1523. Barnard however records that in 1256, the church of Frindsbury (and thus the income) was returned to the Bishop. In 1279 and again in 1293, 1314 and 1357 the bishop of Rochester claimed liberties in the lands of the priory of Frindsbury as well as all lands belonging to the church. In 1348 the manor was confirmed as being in the possession of the prior of Rochester, reconfirmed in 1295. In 1287 the manor, along with its appendages of Chattenden, Strood and Rede, were taxed at £24-6-8 (£24.33).

Frindsbury Clubs. In 1291, there was an altercation between the Monks of Rochester and Newark Priory in Strood as a result of a communication difficulty. The good folk of Frindsbury soundly beat up the monks who were trespassing. However, the church sided with the monks, and on Whit Monday the Frindsbury lads had to do penance by walking to abbey and craving forgiveness carrying their clubs. This continued till none of the participants was alive. In the 18th century the boys of Frindsbury and Strood met up each May Day to have a faction fight, though it is unclear whether it was between themselves or against the boys from Rochester.

=== Modern ===
In 1891 the civil parish had a population of 5060. On 30 September 1894, the Local Government Board confirmed an order of Kent County Council, and Frindsbury parish was divided into Frindsbury Intra, and Frindsbury Extra. Intra joined the municipal borough of Rochester, while part of Frindsbury Extra joined Strood Rural District. The remaining part of Frindsbury Extra joined Rochester in 1934. It is now in the unparished area of Rochester.

Modern day Frindsbury is often referred to as North Strood as it lies within the borders of the very northern part of the town, contiguous to the village of Wainscott. Its population is included in Strood's approximate 40,000 residents. Although Frindsbury is considered part of Strood, the parish of Frindsbury Extra lies outside the borders of Strood and comes under Rochester. The parish includes Upnor, Wainscott, Chattenden and various other small hamlets which are situated north of the main town Strood.

== Buildings ==
=== The Manor of Frindsbury ===
The Manor House is a grade II listed farmhouse dating from the late 16th century. In 1753 a new front was added to the existing building in the late Georgian style. The house consists of a central 3-storey block flanked by 2-storey wings. A 20th-century porch has been added. This is also referred to as Court Lodge Farm. The building was proposed for demolition during March 1958.

Adjacent to the Manor House is an early fifteenth-century tithe barn. The barn is a grade I listed building at UK grid reference TQ7474870065. In early 2003 the barn of the Manor House suffered a serious fire which destroyed four of its thirteen bays. (Note: Sources on the internet differ over the date of the fire. Some ascribe it 2004 or 2005, some to 2006, but without supporting references. Austin (2005) clearly gives the date as 22 January 2003, citing Austin (2003) in support. Austin (2005) also ties the date to the national fireman's strike on that evening.) The damaged and fallen timbers were salvaged during the following summer and are stored in the undamaged part of the barn. The barn is owned by the Church Commissioners who, prior to the fire, leased it to the farmer as an equipment store.

==== Medieval structure ====
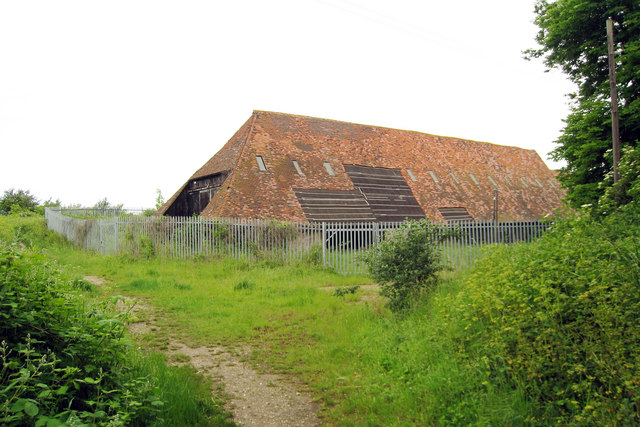
View of the south end of the barn

The official listing description is drawn from Rigold (1966) and ascribes a date of 1300. Austin (2005, p. 4) challenges this date on the basis of dendrochronological and radiocarbon dating performed in 2002. The former gives a felling date of 1403, the latter 1400 ± 60 years. The barn is of aisled construction and until the fire was 65.6 metres (215 ft) by 10.6 metres (35 ft). The barn is notable for the quality of its construction: "the undoubted queen of the Kentish barns", "Its carpentry is peerless" (both quotes from to Rigold (1966, p. 10)) or Austin's view "exemplary and executed to a high standard".

The footings are of mortared flint and stone rising to 1.2 metres (3 ft 11 in) at the northward end of the barn. They may originally have been lime rendered internally. The heart of the structure is a series of rectangular frames (arcade posts and collar beams) rising approximately 5 metres (16 ft) above the dwarf walls. The frames are transversely braced. Linking the tops of the frames longitudinally is the arcade plate which is jointed and braced to each upright. 2 metres (6 ft 7 in) outside the arcade are the aisle posts (2m high) supporting an aisle tie to the main arcade posts. The aisle posts are linked by the eaves plate, though not braced to it. Resting on and braced to the collar beams are crown posts supporting a collar plate. The rafters are supported by the eaves plates, arcade plates and collar plates forming a single unbroken slope. To complete the exterior of the building, weatherboards run from under the eaves vertically down to the ground plates. The weatherboards are thought to be a rare survival of the original boards. A dendrochronological of one board gave 1357, but this was not the outermost ring of the tree.

The roof may have been originally thatched but is now covered with peg tiles. The entire roof has been retiled on new battens during August 1975 though earlier hand-made tiles have been reused alongside machine made tiles.

Although the structure shows little sign of decay and replacement, the rafters above the aisles of bays 7 and 11 are of machine-sawn softwood. In same bays, and also the lost bay 3, the medieval footings are also absent. Austin argues that this suggests the location of tall entrances (midstreys) at these points.

==== Later changes ====
Much of the barn's original footings have been replaced. The original footings are present in the first 5 bays, particularly at the east side. The footings in the west wall of bays 5 onwards were rebuilt from November 1974 to April 1975. The rest consists of a mixture of eighteenth and nineteenth century repairs, often in brick. As well as the footings, parts of the ground plate and some weatherboards have been replaced. Some of this work was maintenance of the more vulnerable parts of the barn, but some reflected changing use. Notable amongst the changes were the blocking up of all the medieval doors and the insertion of later entrances.

At various times low and high level partitions have been added. Evidence of this activity is present in chisel work, nail holes, mortices and the impression of boards in remaining timbers. Most of the floor is nineteenth-century concrete with drainage channels. This appears to be associated with the housing of cattle. In other parts of the barn earthen and chalk floors can be found. In bays 8 and 9 worn cobbles and granite setts are again associated with animals, particularly with a nearby stable door and chewed timbers.

Bay 11 has timber floors in each aisle. The timbers are hand sawn and old. Brick sleeper walls discovered by excavation indicate that the timber flooring may have continued across the whole width. Similar sleeper walls have been found in the damaged bay 3. Both these bays are thought to be the location of the medieval entrances and Austin suggests that they may have been threshing floors.

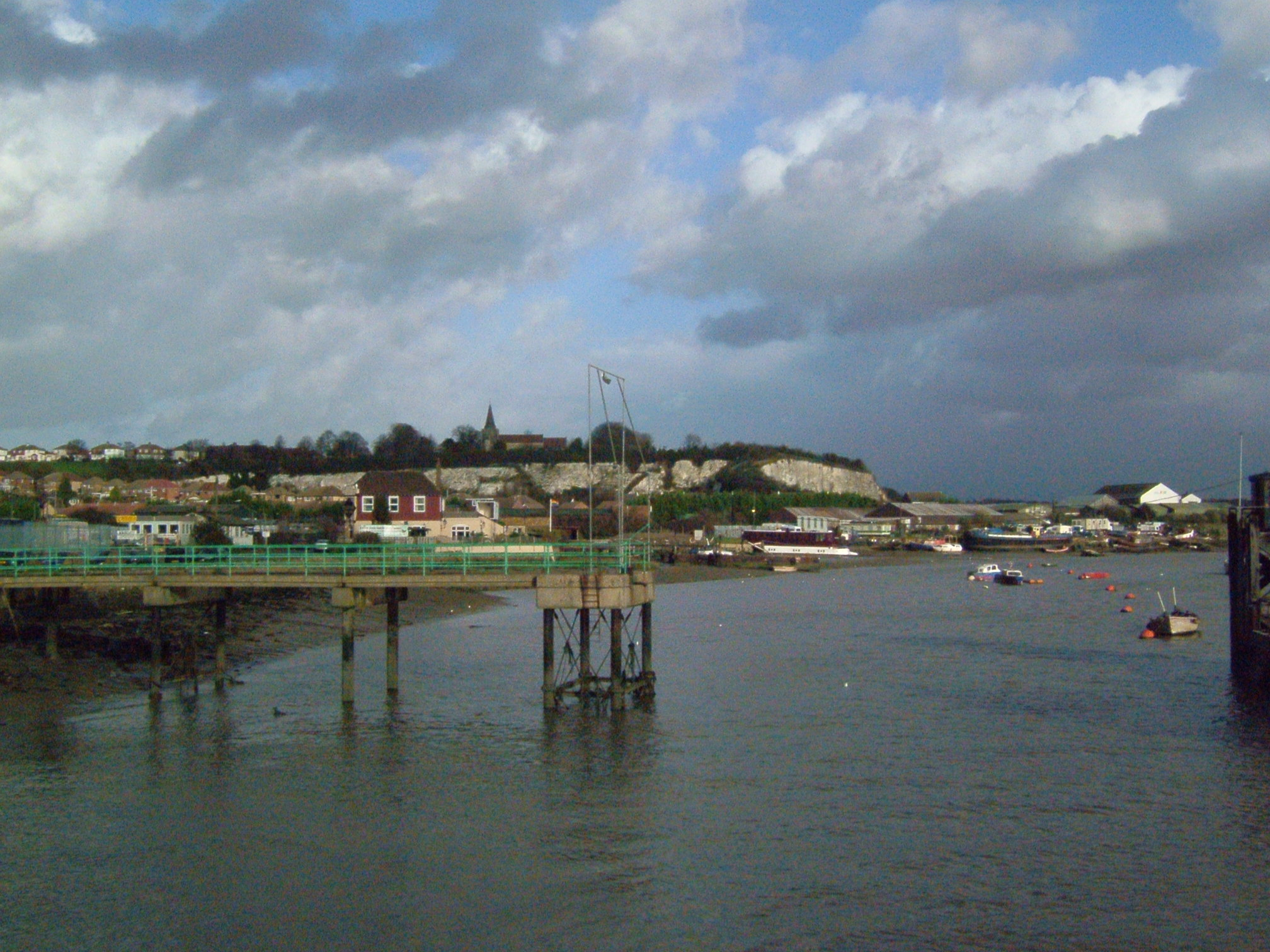
All Saints Church, Frindsbury stands on a hill overlooking the Medway. The hill has been extensively quarried leaving the distinctive cliffs. To the left of All Saints Church is Church Green. In front of it is Strood Pier and the entrance to the Strood basin. To the right is the Frindsbury Peninsula, and the Phoenix Wharf and Lower Curel's Yard.

=== The Church of All Saints ===
The present church was started around 1075 by Paulinus, sacrist of Rochester who gave books and vestments to it. It was rebuilt in 1127. There was more building in the 14th century and around 1407. The church was extensively restored in 1884. An image of the church pre restoration is in the British Library. The church has recently been fitted with disabled access, a WC and a kitchenette to the rear of the nave.

=== Quarry House ===
Quarry House is first mentioned in 1575. Then there was an early 17th-century brick residence, which became a fashionable place for a visit, to observe the prospect. It was demolished in 1897 so that the chalk on which it stood could be extracted. Drawings of it were made before its destruction. A full history of the house was written in the late 19th.

=== The Parsonage ===
The purpose of a mediaeval church was to raise revenue for the Bishop (the same man being the Rector of Frindsbury), and the lands needed to be managed. The Bishop knowing the income would appoint a clerk in Holy Orders say mass and minister to the congregation- he would become the vicar. The rector would have a Parsonage, which could be rented out if he didn't use it. There was a parsonage in Bill Street, and by 1591 it was occupied by the Watson Family. It was demolished at an unknown date post 1930.

=== Islingham Farm ===
This was a significant rural community of which there are few remains.

=== Royal Oak Pub ===
The pub was first built in the late 17th century as a house. By 1754 it was in use as a public house. It was under threat of demolition for redevelopment. On 24 May 2016 the building was listed Grade II, and the building was converted into housing in 2020.

== Industry ==
=== Industrial history ===
Frindsbury today is principally a dormitory suburb of Rochester with significant commercial activity on the Frindsbury Peninsula. The housing merges Frindsbury and Strood. The availability of such housing is to the part caused by the previous land usage. Until 1811, most inhabitants worked in agriculture, but by 1831, 90% worked in quarrying or manufacturing making this an industrial hot spot, well in advance of the rest of Kent. Wealth and poverty was thus dependent on the generosity of a handful of employers and the state of the national economy, boom and recession. As one industry abandoned the land it had despoiled, newer ones moved in and used the space, and finally this was turned over to housing. The streets bear the names of the previous elite.

=== Frindsbury Mills ===
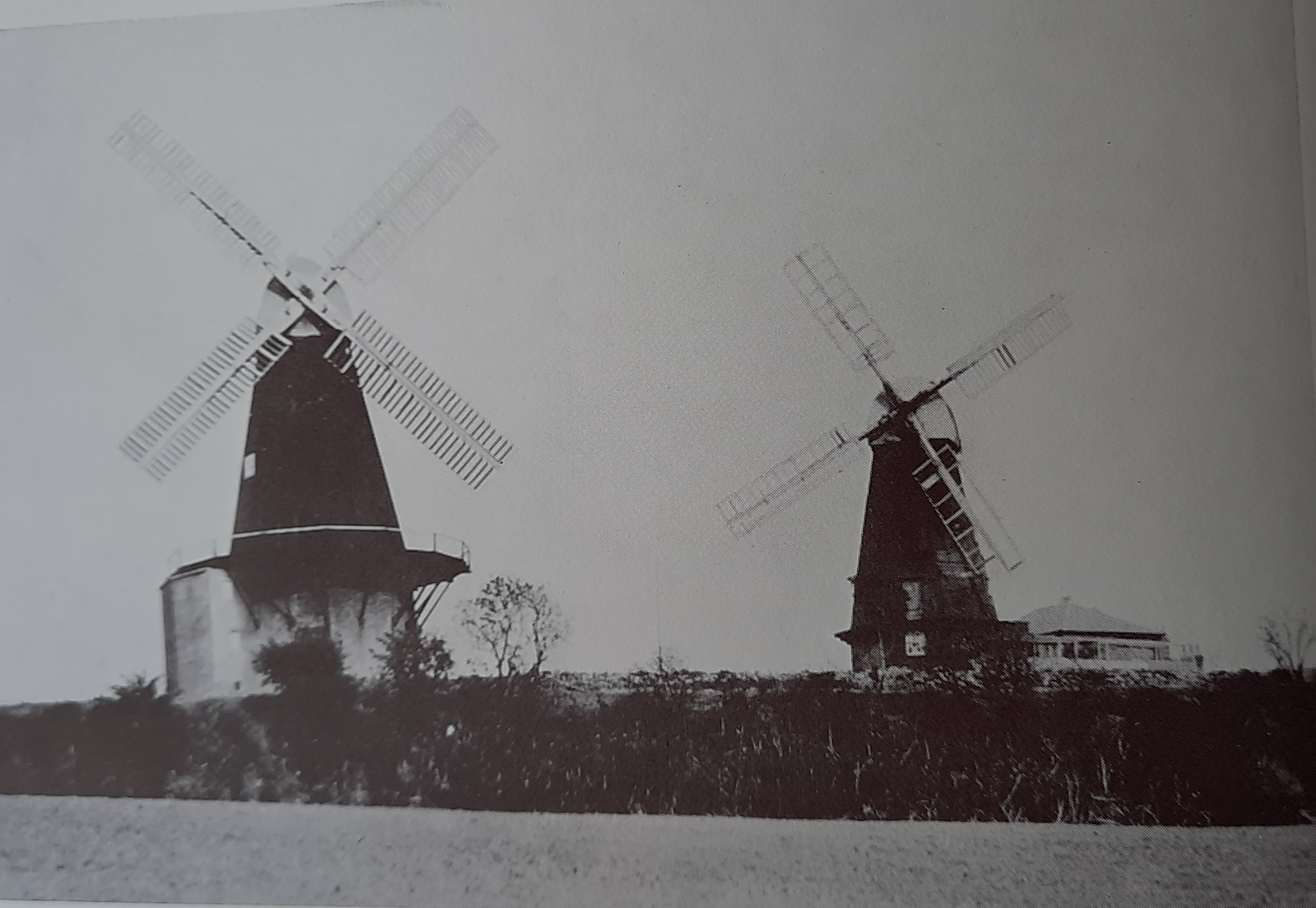
Prospect Hill Mills

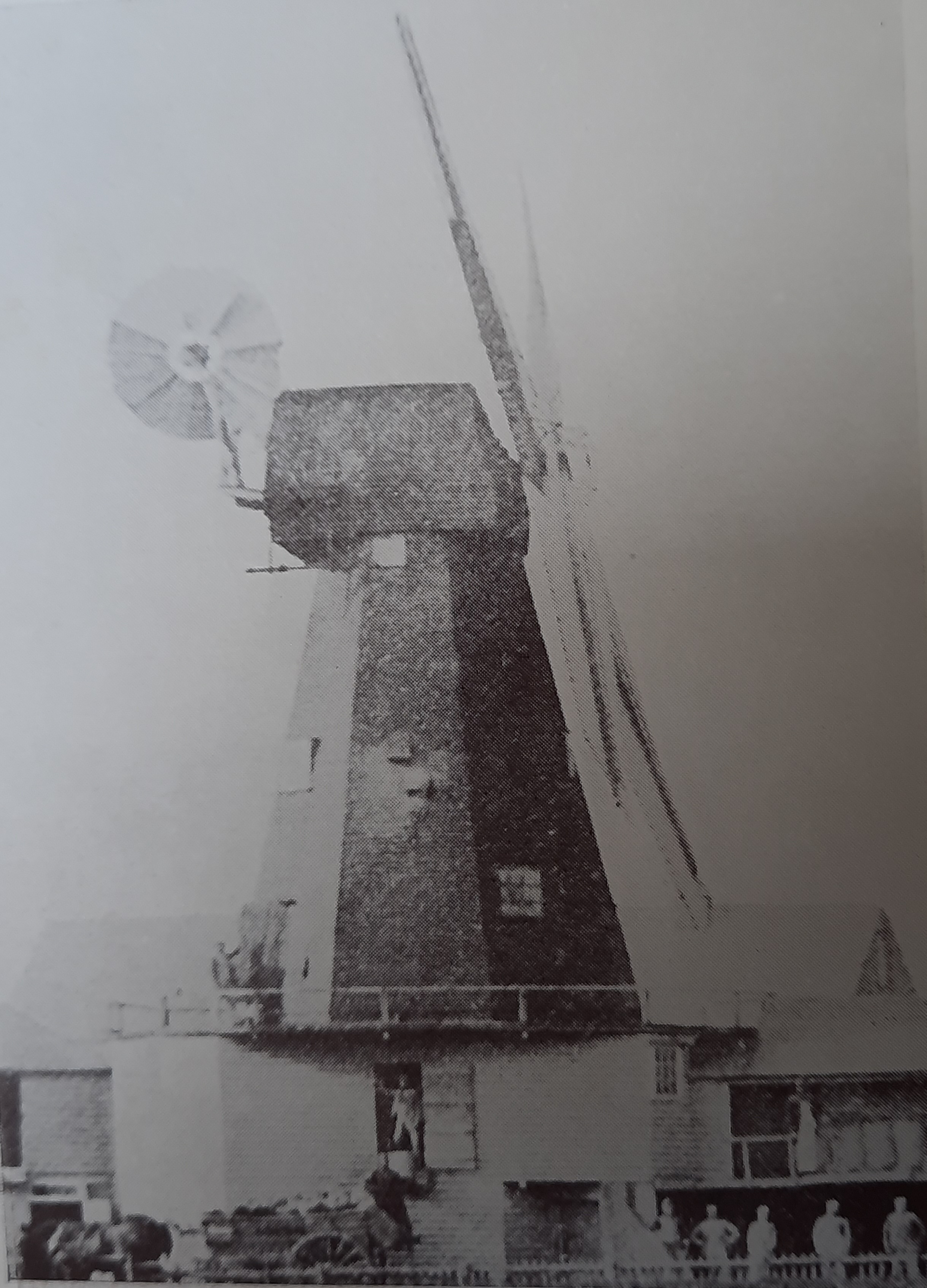
House Mill

The first recorded windmill was on a map of 1596. It was called the Quarry Mill, was 100 yds southeast of the church and was destroyed in 1850. It was a post mill.

The next four Frindsbury mills were all owned by Mr Kimmins (c1845 et seq.).

On Prospect Hill there were two mills. The first was called Manwaring's Mill, or Little Mill. It was a black tarred smock mill that drove four pairs of millstones. Next to it was the Great Mill or Rose's Mill. It was the highest in Kent with forty foot by nine-foot sails. Together the two mills produced 400 sacks of flour a week. Little Mill was struck by lightning and demolished in 1886. Great Mill was demolished in 1890.

Kimmin's Mill (1819–1843), was a smock mill with no base. The land became a brick field. A man was killed by its sails.

House Mill, also known as Kimmin's Mill or Frindsbury Mill, stood on Frindsbury Hill and was a black smock mill. It was demolished in 1931.

Close by in Strood on Broom Hill were two more mills, Field Mill and Killick's Mill.

=== Ship and barge building ===
See main article Shipbuilding in Frindsbury, Kent for details of ships and barges built in the Frindsbury area

=== Thames and Medway Canal ===
See main article Thames and Medway Canal for details

=== Sand ===
The moulding sand from below Upnor parish church was used to make metal castings. It was of such a high quality that it was exported.

=== Brickfields ===
In 1847, there were 6 brickfields in Frindsbury. Three were at Manor Farm, two were at Whitewall Creek and one at Ten Gun Field Upnor. Top soil would be removed, the brickearth was removed and the topsoil replaced and farming continued or orchards were planted. Ten Gun Field was in operation in 1800 and produced around 2.5 million bricks annually over the period. Production peaked in 1844 when it produced 14 million, 1% of the national output.

The bricks were Yellow Stock bricks, the colour produced by adding up to 17% chalk to the clay. The brick were graded as Firsts, Seconds (used for facings), Thirds (used for internals), Roughs (used for hardcore) and Chuffs that were unusable.

Other later brickfields were at Barn Meadow (today's Sholden Road) which produced reds, Wickenden Brickyard by Cooling Road, and Frindsbury Brickyard owned by the West family (closed in 1931).

The business declined when the Fletton clay at Peterborough began to be exploited. This clay contained 5% tar oil, so required less fuel to fire. The Frindsbury brickyards reverted to agriculture or were used for new housing.

=== Cement works ===
Portland Cement is made from a mixture of chalk and clay containing alumina and silica. It was first manufactured in 1842 at Rotherhithe by William Aspdin, and the first site outside the Thames valley at which it was manufactured was on Limehouse Reach, Frindsbury. I. C. Johnson, who had previously made cement at Swanscombe Peninsula, bought an oil mill at Frindsbury, and converted it to make cement, commencing on 1 May 1851. This became known as the Crown Works. Subsequently, six more cement works were built along Limehouse Reach, all using the chalk that forms the Frindsbury ridge, and alluvial clay from the Medway Estuary.

The cement works were, from north to south:

- Phoenix Works (started 1877)
- Globe Works (1880)
- Bridge Works (1885)
- Crown Works (1851)
- Quarry Works (1889)
- Beehive Works (1880)
- Beaver Works (1884)

By 1904, when these works reached their greatest development, there were 132 kilns with 30 kiln chimneys, capable of making around 4000 tons of cement a week, and employed 800. All the works started as independent companies, but were gradually merged, and in 1900 the entire site was acquired by APCM, who renamed the site "Crown and Quarry Works". The works had limited raw materials, and its capacity was reduced to around half its peak size, before finally shutting down in 1963, after most of the chalk on the Frindsbury peninsula had been used up.

The Formby Works (established 1862) was at Whitewall Creek and did not join the APCM. This produced initially 60 tons a week, and eventually 500 tons a week. As the chalk from Tower Hill declined, it was brought by barge from Halling. The Formby Works closed in 1909.

== Shooting the Bridge ==
To get under the Rochester Bridge, without losing headway, barges would approach at speed and drop their mast, using the winch at the bow, and when safely under, raise it again. To do this required extra crew, so called 'Hufflers', who were taken on at Whitewall creek. They waited offshore in their skiffs which were then tethered to the barge. They helped lower and raise the mast so the barge could shoot the bridge. They were let off at Janes Creek or Temple Creek in Strood.

== Holes in the ground ==
The Hill on which Frindsbury stands is riddled with holes. These are possibly from ancient mining or could be natural caves caused by water erosion. At various points these have opened up killing at least one woman as well as causing subsidence.

== Local government ==
Half of Frindsbury was outside the borders of the City of Rochester hence the name Frindsbury Extra. The other half was within the city so was referred to as Frindsbury Intra, a name that has long disappeared, being called Frindsbury.

This distinction is significant, Frindsbury was a ward in the City of Rochester, and in the City of Rochester-upon-Medway. Frindsbury Extra was a ward of Strood Rural District Council which was abolished in 1974. Eleven of the 16 Strood Rural parishes, joined Rochester City Council and Chatham Borough Council to become the Rochester-upon-Medway Borough Council which in 1978 became Rochester-upon-Medway City Council. The eleven parishes remained parished i.e. have an elected parish council, while former Rochester wards were not. This distinction means that the Electoral Commission will not allow any boundary change to the wards, whereby an elector loses or gains the right to vote in a parish election.

Medway Council is a unitary authority established in 1998. Frindsbury is split in two local government level wards: Strood North and Strood Rural, each represented by three councillors from the Conservative Party (as of February 2019).

== Visitors ==
William Hogarth with Samuel Scott visited Rochester in May 1732. Ebenezer Forest wrote a journal of the five-day trip containing the lines "we all proceeded merrily to Frendsbury". They examined Frindsbury Church, then walked to Upnor where Hogarth made a drawing of the beautiful and ancient Upnor Castle. They then examined the Ten Gun Battery and the Birds Nest Battery before walking to Hoo.

In 1783, engravers Samuel and Nathaniel Buck drew their prospect of Rochester from the top of All Saints' Church Tower.
