= Rochester-upon-Medway City Council elections =

Local government elections in Kent, England

Rochester-upon-Medway was a non-metropolitan district in Kent, England. It was abolished on 1 April 1998 and replaced by Medway.

== Political control ==
The first election to the council was held in 1973, initially operating as a shadow authority alongside the outgoing authorities before coming into its powers on 1 April 1974. Political control of the council from 1974 until its abolition in 1998 was as follows:

Party in control	Years
Labour	1974–1976
Conservative	1976–1991
No overall control	1991–1995
Labour	1995–1998

=== Leadership ===
The leaders of the council from 1991 until its abolition were:

Councillor	Party	From	To
Doug McInnes	Conservative		May 1991
John Shaw	Labour	May 1991	31 Mar 1998

== Council elections ==
The last election results were:

Year	Total	Cons	Lab	LibDem	Other
1995	50	1	44	5	0
1991	50	22	20	8	0
1987	50	29	14	6	1

- 1973 Medway Borough Council election
- 1976 Medway Borough Council election
- 1979 Medway Borough Council election (New ward boundaries)
- 1983 Rochester-upon-Medway City Council election
- 1987 Rochester-upon-Medway City Council election
- 1991 Rochester-upon-Medway City Council election
- 1995 Rochester-upon-Medway City Council election
