= City of Rochester-upon-Medway =

Former city in Kent, England

Rochester-upon-Medway Medway (1974–1979)
- Area
  - 1974: 39,579 acres (160.17 km^{2})
  - Coordinates: 51.39095°N 0.50280°E
- Population
  - 1974: 143,080
  - 1992: 147,600
- History
  - Created: 1974; 52 years ago
  - Abolished: 1998; 28 years ago
  - Succeeded by: Medway
- Status: Non-metropolitan district Borough; City (1982–1998)
- Government: Medway Borough Council (1974–1979); Rochester-upon-Medway Borough Council (1979–1982); Rochester-upon-Medway City Council (1982–1998)
  - HQ: Rochester
  - Motto: Loyal and True
- Coat of arms

Rochester-upon-Medway was a non-metropolitan district in north Kent, England from 1974 to 1998. It covered Rochester, Chatham, Luton, Lordswood, Walderslade, Strood and the Hoo Peninsula.

The district was formed as Medway under the Local Government Act 1972 on 1 April 1974, as a merger of the Municipal Borough of Rochester, the borough of Chatham and most of Strood Rural District. The district council was granted a charter entitling it to be known as the Borough of Medway, and preserving the mayoralties of Rochester and Chatham.

== Name change and city status ==
On creation in 1974 the new Medway Borough Council applied to inherit the city status of Rochester, but this was refused. Instead, special letters patent were granted on 18 March 1974, which declared that the existing area would continue to constitute the City of Rochester, notwithstanding its abolition as a local government authority. In rejecting the council's application, the Home Office noted that it might be possible to extend city status to the entire borough in the future, provided that "Rochester" feature in its name.

On 3 December 1979 the Medway Borough Council passed a resolution renaming the district as the Borough of Rochester-upon-Medway, and on 25 January 1982 further letters patent were issued declaring that in future:

...the whole of the said Borough and not the said part of the Borough as heretofore should have the name style and status of a City...

Accordingly the district became the City of Rochester-upon-Medway.

== Abolition ==
Following a review by the Local Government Commission for England, the city was abolished on 1 April 1998, when it was merged with the neighbouring Gillingham Borough Council to form a new unitary authority of Medway.

An inadvertent effect of the 1998 abolition was the ending of Rochester's historic city status, due to the failure of the outgoing city council to appoint charter trustees. This only became apparent in 2002.

== See also ==
- Rochester-upon-Medway City Council elections
