= Frindsbury Extra =

Civil parish in Kent, England

Coordinates: 51.4038°N 0.5048°E

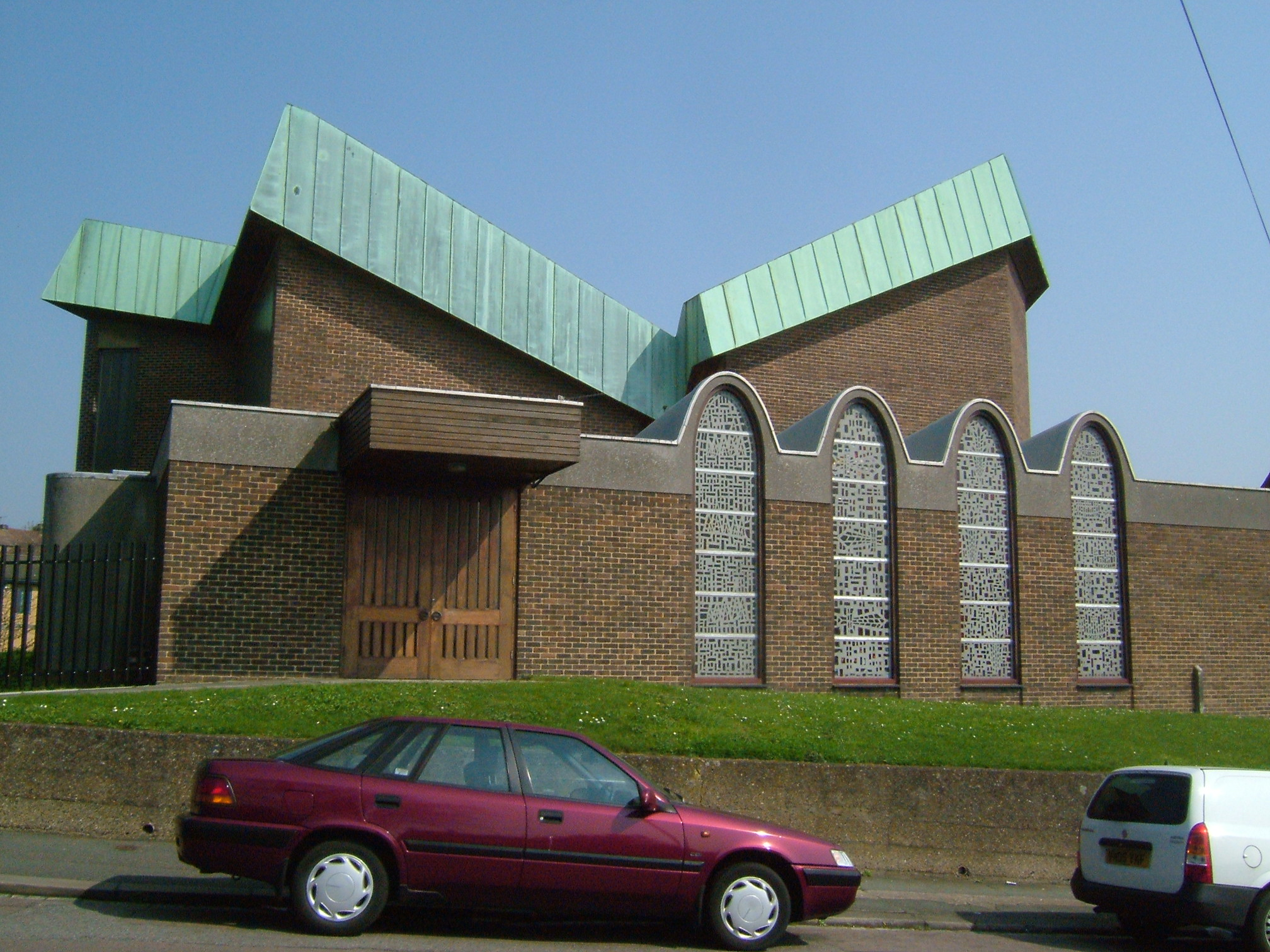
- English Martyrs' Church, Frindsbury Hill

- Location within Kent
- Area: 8.34 km^{2} (3.22 sq mi)
- Population: 6,501 (2011 census)
  - Density: 779/km^{2} (2,020/sq mi)
- OS grid reference: TQ 744 704
- Civil parish: Frindsbury Extra
- Unitary authority: Medway
- Ceremonial county: Kent
- Region: South East
- Country: England
- Sovereign state: United Kingdom
- Post town: ROCHESTER
- Postcode district: ME2 ME3
- Dialling code: 01634
- Police: Kent
- Fire: Kent
- Ambulance: South East Coast
- UK Parliament: Rochester and Strood

Frindsbury Extra is a civil parish divided into commercial, suburban residential and rural parts on the Hoo Peninsula in Medway, a ceremonial part of Kent. It is contiguous with the fully urbanised Frindsbury part of Strood and is bounded by Cliffe and Cliffe Woods to the north, Hoo to the east, and the River Medway to the south-east at Upnor (or Upnor-on-Medway) and a long, narrow meander of the River Medway in the far south. On Medway Council it has councillors representing the Strood Rural ward currently on almost identical boundaries.

== History ==
On 30 September 1894, the Local Government Board confirmed an order of Kent County Council, and Frindsbury civil parish was divided into Frindsbury Intra, and Frindsbury Extra. Intra joined the municipal borough of Rochester, while part of Frindsbury Extra joined Strood Rural District. The remaining part of Frindsbury Extra joined Rochester in 1934.

Since 1998 it is one of 11 civil parishes in the Unitary Borough—approximately a quarter of the land of the borough is unparished for local administration.

== Geography ==
As a lowest-level administrative area, Frindsbury Extra contains the villages or dependent residential localities of:

- Wainscott (its most populous part, contiguous with Frindsbury)
- Upnor on the Medway
  - Lower Upnor
  - Upper Upnor
- Chattenden
- White Wall
- Stone Horse.

As with Frindsbury Intra, today known interchangeably as North Strood or Frindsbury, which is contiguous with Strood and immediately north of Strood railway station, Wainscott is southward of the A289 dual carriageway. The rest of the Frindsbury Extra is north of the A289 dual carriageway. The former council offices of Strood Rural District are in Frindsbury Extra.

== Demography ==
2011 Published Statistics: Population, home ownership and extracts from Physical Environment, surveyed in 2005
Output area	Homes owned outright	Owned with a loan	Socially rented	Privately rented	Other	km² green spaces	km² roads	km² water	km² domestic gardens	km² domestic buildings	km² non-domestic buildings	Usual residents	km²
Frindsbury Extra	854	1149	281	239	56	6.00	0.48	0.25	0.63	0.17	0.29	6501	8.34
