= Strood =

Town in Kent, England

Coordinates: 51.3930°N 0.4780°E

- Town
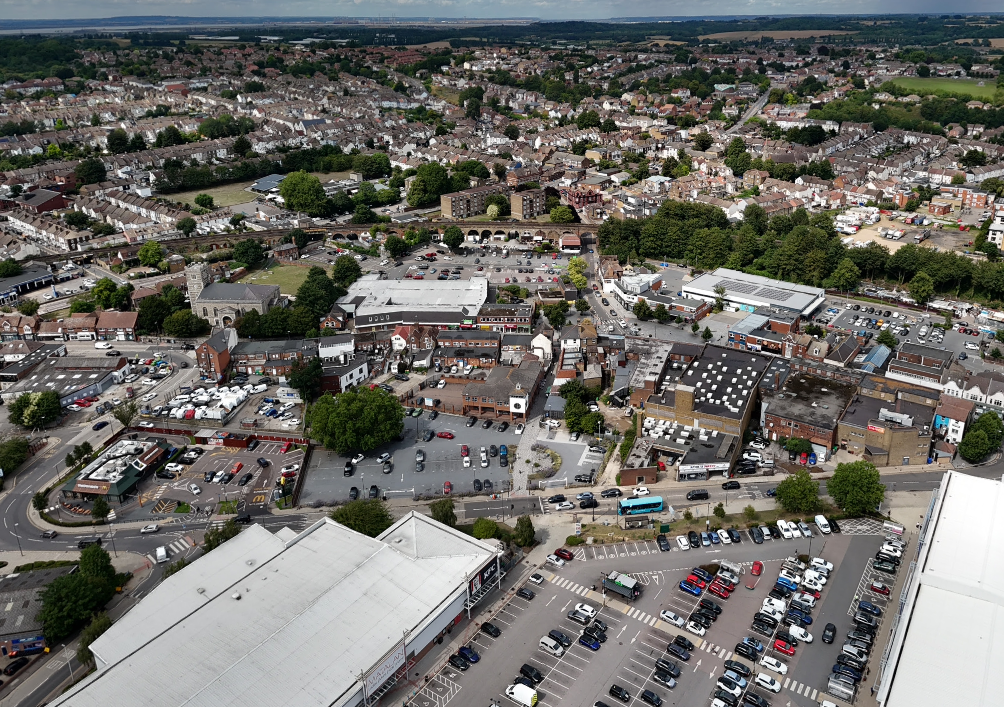
- Aerial view of Strood

- Location within Kent
- Population: 39,000
- OS grid reference: TQ725695
- Unitary authority: Medway
- Ceremonial county: Kent
- Region: South East
- Country: England
- Sovereign state: United Kingdom
- Post town: ROCHESTER
- Postcode district: ME2
- Dialling code: 01634
- Police: Kent
- Fire: Kent
- Ambulance: South East Coast
- UK Parliament: Rochester and Strood

Strood is a town in the unitary authority of Medway in Kent, South East England. Strood forms a conurbation with neighbouring towns Rochester, Chatham, Gillingham and Rainham. It lies on the northwest bank of the River Medway at its lowest bridging point.

Strood began as a manor then chapelry of Frindsbury until gaining its own parish status in 1193. Today Frindsbury is effectively, in all but a few associations such as in the Church of England, the northern part of Strood. The history of Strood has been dominated by the River Medway and facing port-associated towns, particularly its road and rail bridges since the Roman era to Rochester and the two other Medway Towns immediately adjoining and beyond from the north-east quarter of Kent to London and the rest of Britain. It has a mixed retail and leisure area at its heart.

== History ==
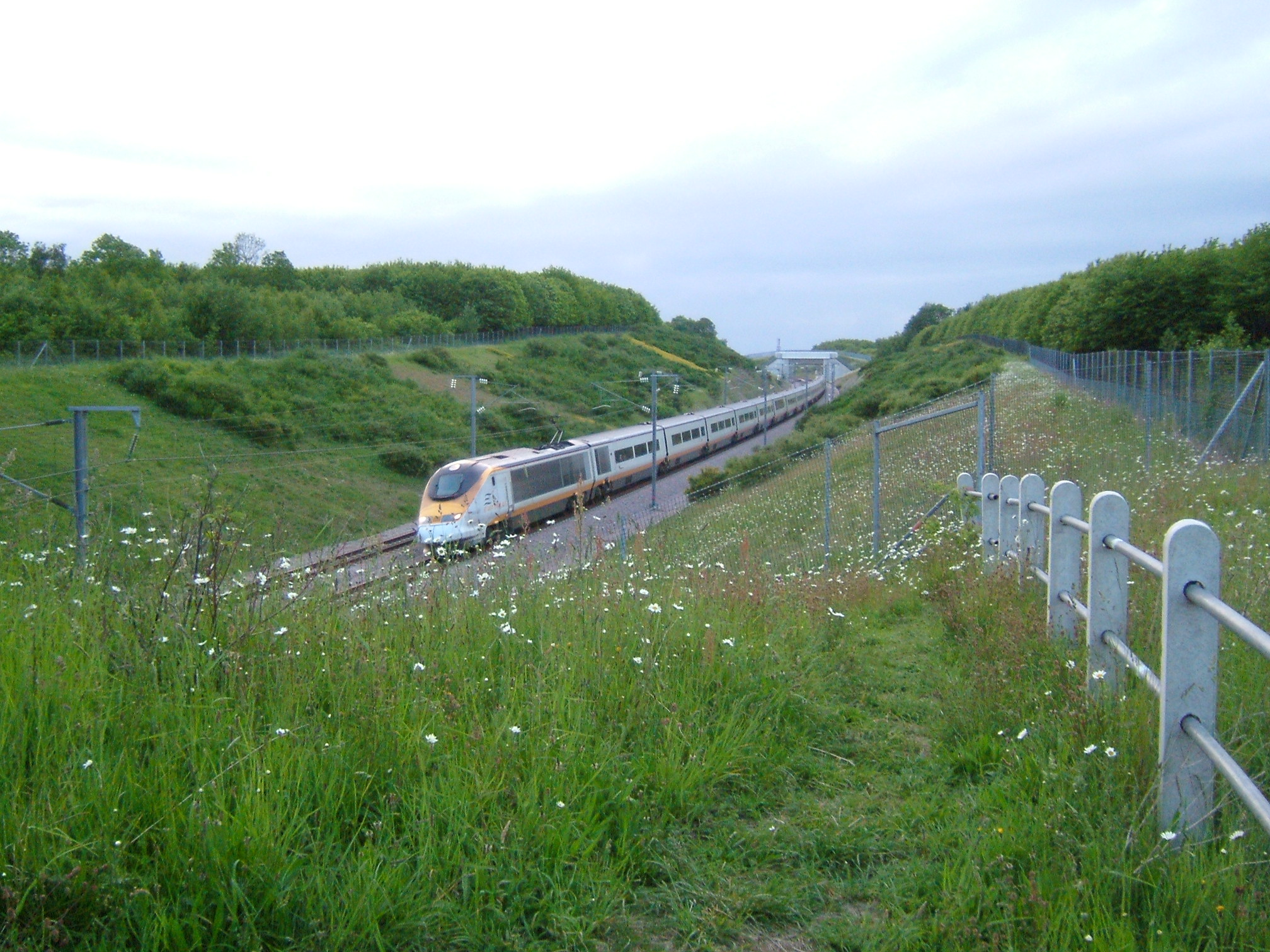
Left: A Eurostar train passing Strood heading for the Medway Viaduct.

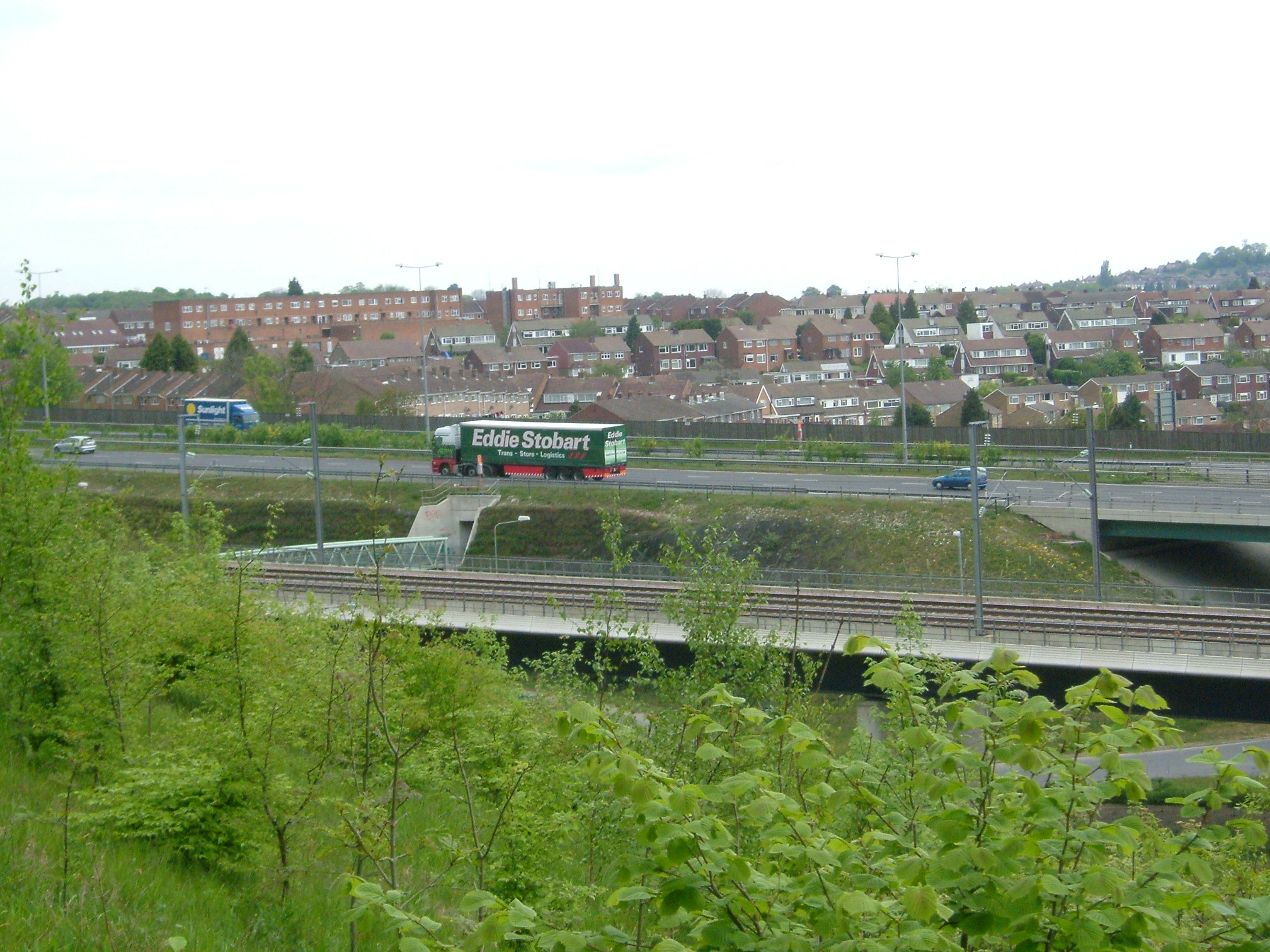
Right: The railway line beside the Medway Viaduct. High Speed 1 and the M2 mark the southwest boundary of Strood.

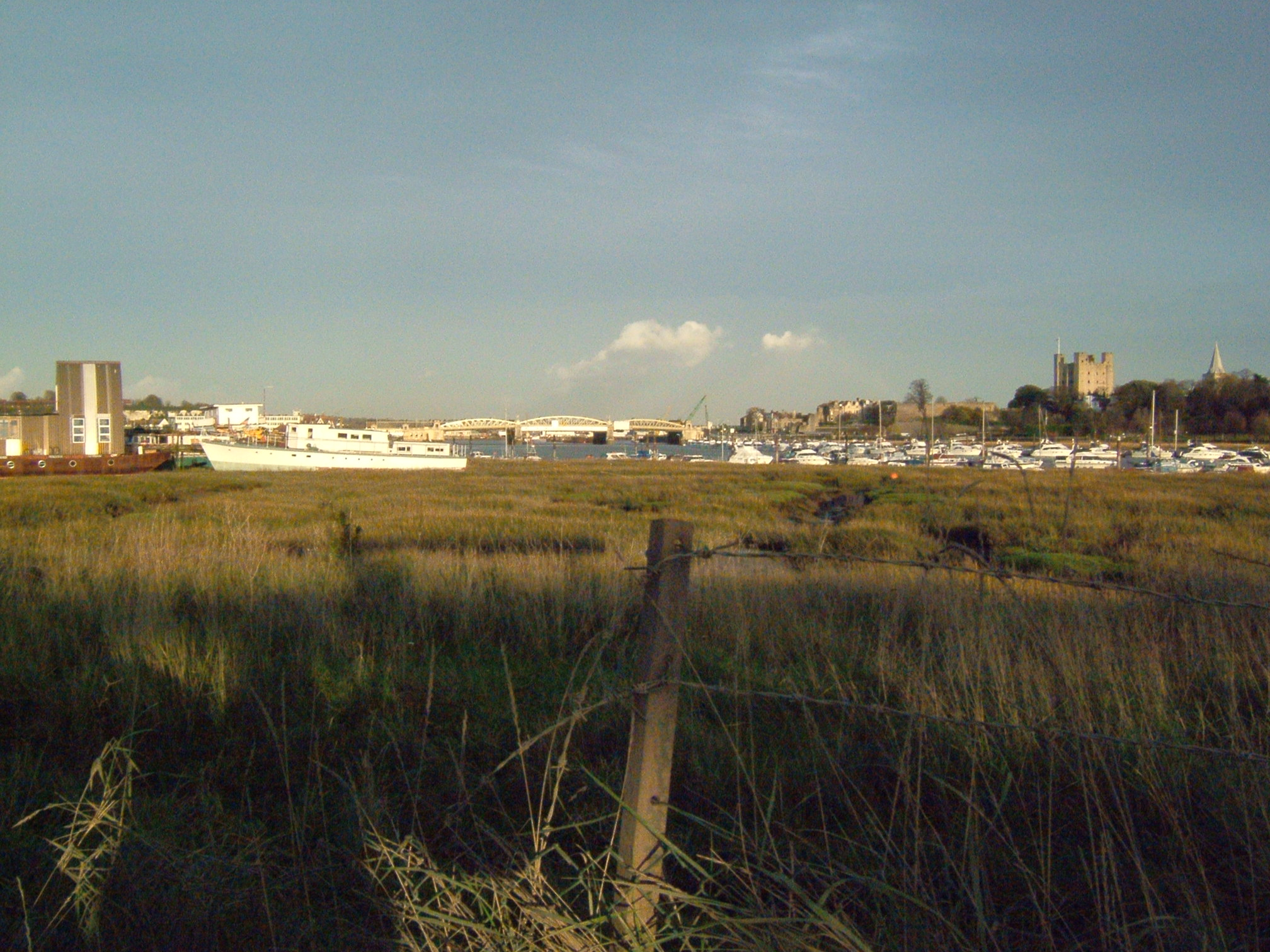
The River Medway and its marshes in Strood, showing Strood juxtaposed with Rochester

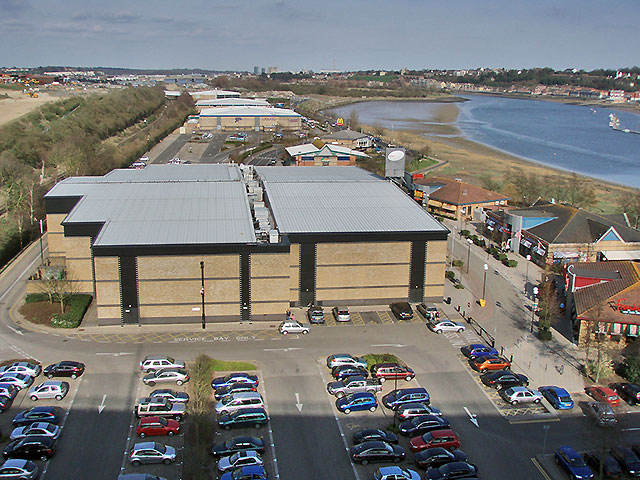
The far end of Medway Valley Leisure Park.

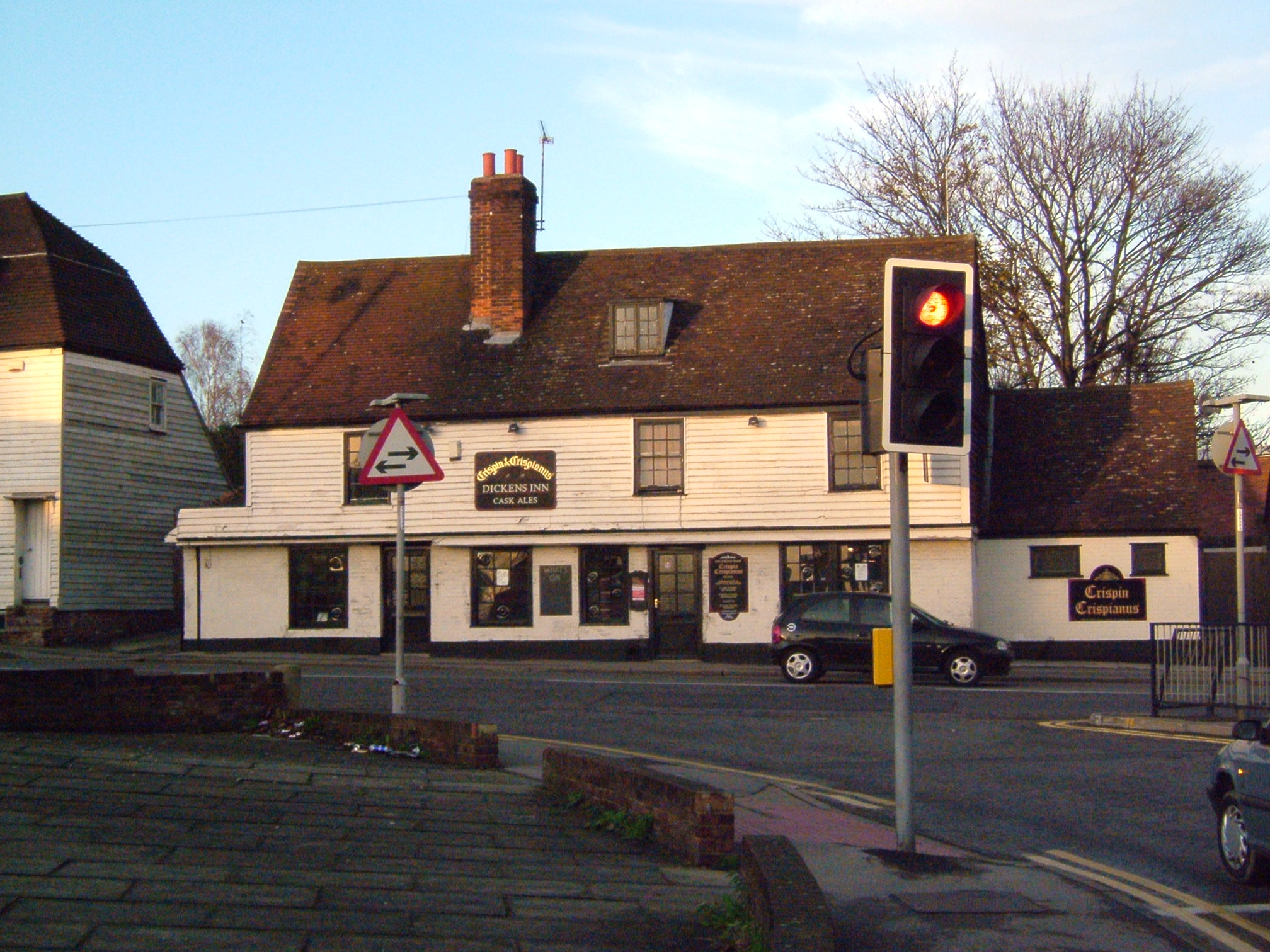
The Crispin and Crispianus pub is typical of the shiplapped houses in Strood on the higher ground, On 27 March 2011 the pub was set alight.

=== Pre-Conquest ===
Strood was part of Frindsbury until 1193. It was named Strodes in the Textus Roffensis, now kept in Rochester Cathedral, though most early records use the spelling Stroud. The Old English name Strōd refers to a "marshy land overgrown with brushwood". The Gloucestershire town of Stroud has the same etymology.

The Roman Legions built a stone bridge and laid a road on a causeway across the marshy ground. The foundations were about 8 ft below the level of the 1856 road. The road went up Strood Hill, and was called Watling Street, as it still is today. This is the A2 road. There is further evidence of a causeway-based road leading along the bank towards the Frindsbury Peninsula leading to a villa, was found on 24 March 1819. The present road and field pattern suggest that there was a substantial agricultural settlement of the Roman Empire centred near Frindsbury.

In 764 AD Offa King of Mercia and Sigered King of Kent granted to Eardulph lands in Easlingham (Frindsbury). In 840 AD, 994 AD, and 998 AD Strood was pillaged by the Danes. In 960 AD a wooden bridge was built across the Medway.

=== Medieval ===
A small wooden church was erected at Strood in 1122, as a chapel of ease in the parish of Frindsbury. Land was granted in 1160 to the Knights Templar by King Henry II. The Manor House was used as a Lodging House.

In 1193, Strood became a parish. It was run by the Grey Friars or Franciscans of Newark Hospital, and had its own burial grounds. In 1291 there was an affray at Newark Hospital between the Monks of Strood and the locals from Frindsbury.

In 1264 Simon de Montfort laid siege to Rochester Castle from the Strood Side. In the action the wooden bridge was destroyed by fire. After Simon's death a heavy fine was levied on Strood because he had stayed there during the siege. The Strood Quay and Strood Wharf had been constructed by Bishop Gilbert de Glanvill with rents going to Newark Hospital. In 1293 the Rochester Wharf was in such disrepair that ships had to use the Strood Wharf, however as Rochester Bridge was out of use, ferries had to be used to cross the river. In 1309, a harsh winter, Rochester Bridge was damaged by ice. In 1312 the Knight's Templar were suppressed and the Manor of Strood passed into private hands briefly before being passed on to the Abbess and Sisters Minorites of St. Clare of Denney in Cambridgeshire. In 1387 a stone bridge was built by John de Cobham and Robert Knolles. In 1460 Edward IV appointed a mayor of Rochester with jurisdiction over Strood river frontage and the houses there.

=== Early Modern ===
Strood was owned by the Rochester Monastery from the 18th year of Edward III's reign until the Dissolution of the Monasteries under Henry VIII, after which time as part of the Hundred of Sharnel (Shamwell) which included Cobham, it was passed to George Brooke, Lord Cobham. His grandson Henry Brooke lost his estates to James I in 1603 through a false charge of treason, although he escaped with his life. The Temple Manor thereafter was granted to Sir Robert Cecil, the Earl of Salisbury (son of William, Lord Burleigh), who later became Lord Treasurer of England under Queen Elizabeth, and married Elizabeth, sister of Henry, Lord Cobham.

In 1554 Thomas Wyatt of Allington on hearing that Mary I intended to marry a Catholic gathered an army with the intention of marching on London. He took Rochester Castle and the bridge. According to Marsh there was to have been a battle at Strood, but the Queen's men, stationed on Strood Hill, deserted. However, Coulson records that Wyatt defeated the Duke of Norfolk and seized six cannon. Wyatt then marched on Cooling Castle. The rebellion fizzled out, and Wyatt was executed, along with the captain of the deserters.

The parish accounts begin on 12 August 1555. Following the accession and marriage of Queen Mary (known as "Bloody" Mary) the country reconverted to Roman Catholicism and a considerable sum was spent re-converting Strood Church. However just nine years later in 1565 a further five-year period of refurbishment was required to convert the church back to Protestant usage following the accession of Queen Elizabeth I. The parish registers start from this date. Possibly mindful of the changes, the churchwardens waited until 1574 before going to St. Dunstan's Fair in Rochester to sell "a cross and other relics of Roman superstition, formerly used in Strood Church".

To the Honour of God.
and for the Benefit of the Poor.
of this Parish, This House was.
Built with Mr. Watt's Charity.
A.D. 1671 in which the Sick and.
Aged are taken care of; ye Ignorant.
instructed, Such as are Able to.
Work Imployed, & a Comfortable.
Maintenance Provided for All..

Go and do Thou Likewise.

Inscription above Strood workhouse

In the 1672 the parishes of St. Margaret's, Rochester and St Nicholas, Strood jointly applied to the Court of Chancery for a ruling which was decided in their favour to extend the area over which Watts charities could operate. The parish of Strood utilised some of the money to provide a workhouse for the poor. Above the door was set a stone slab which is now displayed in the Guildhall Museum, Rochester. The text is reproduced alongside.

In 1769, under authority of the Paving, Etc., of London Act 1768, a tollgate was erected at The Angel Inn on North Street in Strood, to pay for improvements to the parish. Hasted, in his study of Kent (1778–99), said Strood's inhabitants were chiefly seafaring or fishermen, and engaged in dredging oysters.

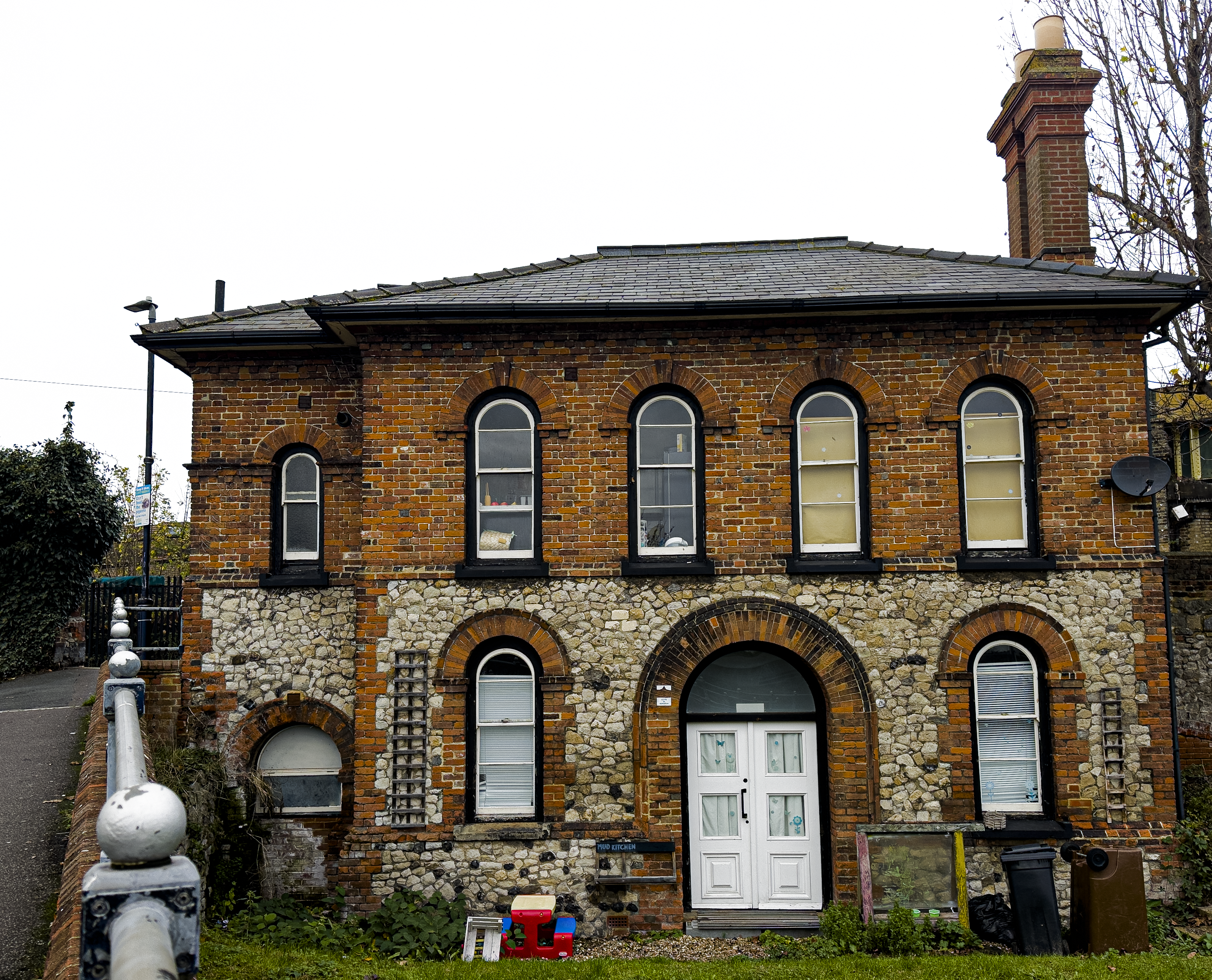
View of 20 Gun Lane (the former workhouse) from St Nicholas churchyard, looking towards Gun Lane in Strood

=== Nineteenth century ===
Between 1804 and 1824 the Thames and Medway canal was dug. See below, under Transport for more details.

=== Twentieth century ===
The ancient City of Rochester merged with the borough of Chatham and part of the Strood Rural District in 1974 to form the Borough of Medway, later renamed the City of Rochester-upon-Medway. In 1998 another merger with the rest of the Medway Towns created the Medway unitary authority.

== Geography ==
Strood lies on the edge of marshy land alongside the River Medway. The chalk hills of the North Downs have been breached at this point, forming a river cliff rising to 100 ft directly behind.

== Strood Fair ==
An annual fair was instituted in 1206 during the seventh year of King John's reign to the priory of Rochester, to be held on 26 August, which continued well into the 18th Century, according to Edward Hasted, the Kent historian. It was traditionally held over three days, and associated with Christian celebration of the Assumption (15 August). The Strood Fair was held regularly until 31 October 1982. The land used for the Strood Fair was sandwiched between Grange Road and Station Road, adjacent to Strood railway station. It was for many years part of the Milsted Dairy Farm, though by 22 August 1975 the farm building had been turned into a motor repair business. The brownfield land was passed on to the Fairground Shift Manager who ran the Strood Fair. It was then used by them to stay through the winter months.

The land is still occupied as winter quarters by the Showman's Guild with its running costs supported by the Strood Fair on the brownfield site, which is facilitated every 12 months. On 15 June 2007 to 18 June 2007, the motor repair building was demolished to be replaced by flats. Today's market is held on a Tuesday and Saturday, and a car boot sale or boot fair is held on a Sunday.

== Newark Hospital ==
Gilbert de Glanvill, Bishop of Rochester, in 1190, early during the reign of Richard I founded a hospital in Strood, east of Strood Church, which was afterwards called the Newark Hospital or Stroud Hospital. Newark Hospital was important in raising the profile of Strood. However, there was constant concern about its financial management, and the rivalry between it and the Rochester Priory. In 1539, under King Henry VIII, the hospital was under the control of the Dean and Chapter of Rochester.

The location of the former Newark Hospital or Strood Hospital is now mainly the Temple Street Car Park behind Strood High Street. The 19th century railway embankment carrying the Chatham Main Line cuts across the back of the site where the Newark Hospital or Strood Hospital used to be. Strood Market was held on part of this land, but was relocated to make way for a food store, Aldi. An archaeological excavation of the site behind Strood High Street was done from March 1974 to June 1974.

== Politics ==
In 1891 the civil parish had a population of 7982. On 30 September 1894 the parish was abolished and split, the part in Rochester Municipal Borough becoming Strood Extra and the rural part becoming Strood Intra. It is now in the unparished area of Rochester.

=== Strood Rural District ===
Strood Rural District was a local government district of Kent from 1894 to 1974. It did not include Strood itself (which formed part of Rochester) and covered a wide area. The offices of Strood Rural District Council were located on Frindsbury Hill, near Parsonage Lane and Bingham Road in Strood. The former offices of the Strood Rural District Council are now occupied by Frindsbury Hall Care Home that has 56 single bedrooms and 9 beds in double rooms. Frindsbury Hall Care Home was opened on 23 October 1987.

=== Strood representation ===
Strood is part of the parliamentary constituency of Rochester and Strood.

Local government was consolidated in the late 1990s into a single tier with the creation of Medway Council.

== Economy ==
=== Engineering ===
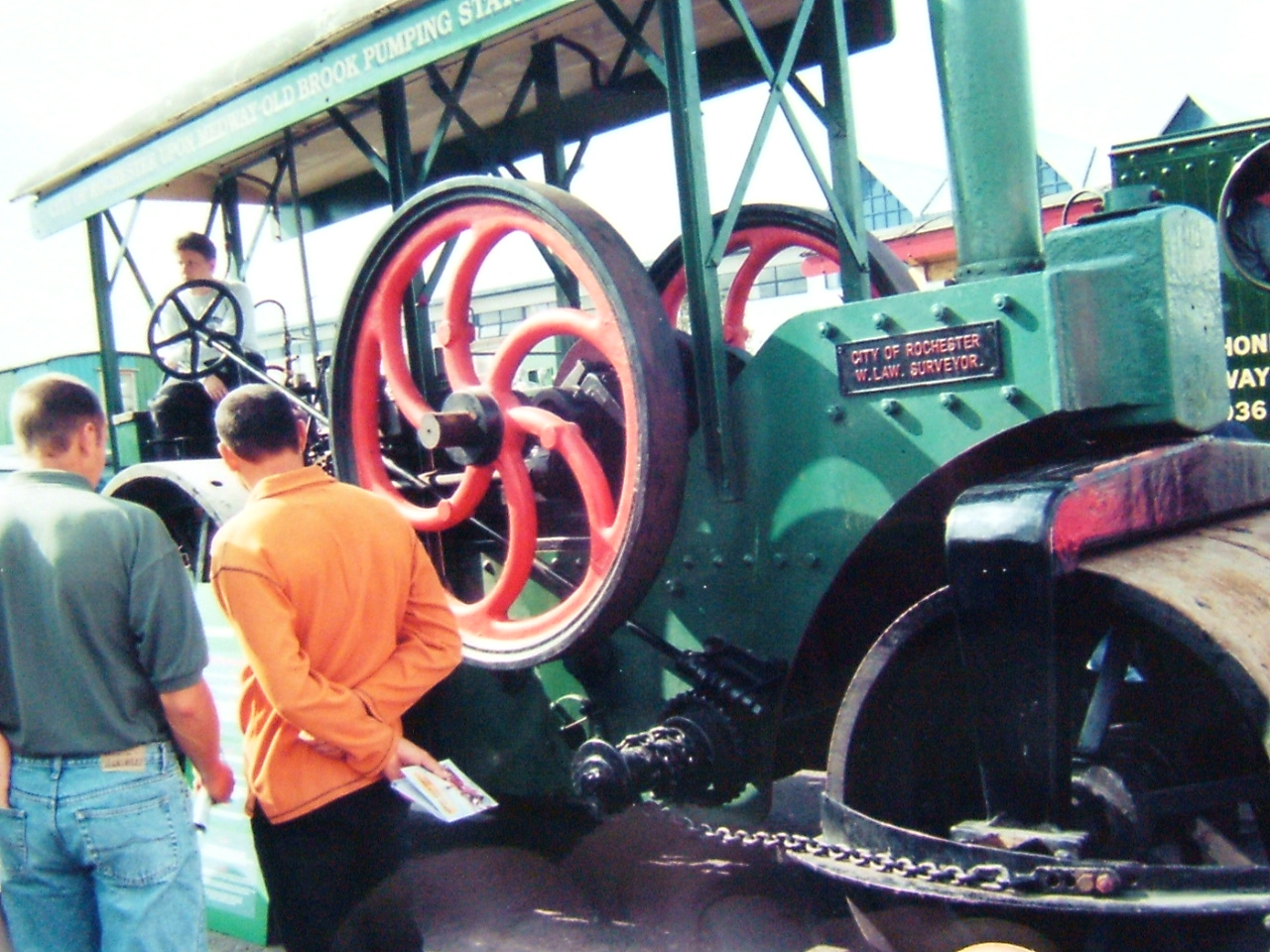
A Strood-built road roller, standing in the grounds of the former Aveling and Porter factory in 1993

Small enterprises were formed to service Chatham Dockyard.

Joseph Collis started as a retail ironmonger in 1777. By 1865 he was a wholesaler specialising in zinc, iron, tinplate and locksmithery. By 1870, he and his partner Stace took over the Pelican Foundry and manufactured structural ironwork, toilet cisterns and manhole covers. Aveling and Porter built traction engines at the Invicta Works next to Rochester Bridge from 1861. Later the works were acquired the Collis and Stace's Pelican Foundry. Avelings were noted for excellent employment practices, and made their premises available for meetings of co-operative and radical societies. Avelings in turn became Wingets factory, then the Rochester-upon-Medway Civic Centre which passed to Medway Council.

Shorts, the seaplane manufacturer, used a yard on the Strood side for construction of the airframes of F3 and F5 flying boats.

Other employers were Hobourn-Eaton, Kent Alloys, Fishers and the Co-operative bakery.

=== Commerce ===
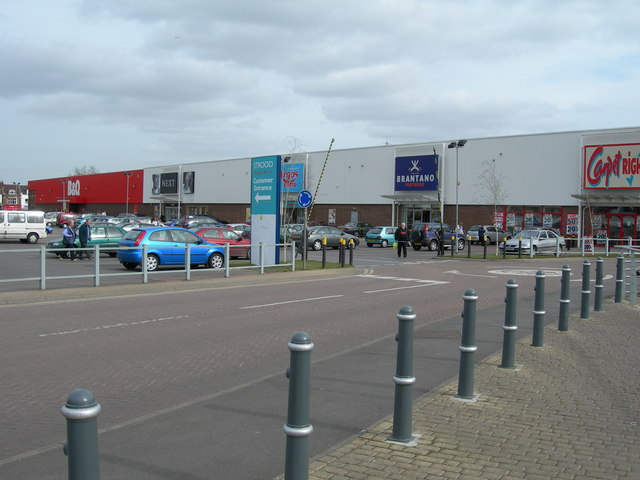
Strood Retail Park

Settlement geography tells us that a bridging point becomes a route centre and a trading centre. Being a lowest bridging point of a critical prehistoric military route compounds the problem. Towns had to be built above the flood plain at a pinch point and flat land on the Rochester side of the River Medway was needed for a walled town with castle and cathedral, in effect sterilising the land that side of the River Medway from future major development. The landmass was locked by the construction of the London, Chatham and Dover railway in an embankment and arches. Small shops grew up around "The Angel" on North Street in Strood forming the town centre.

== Transport ==
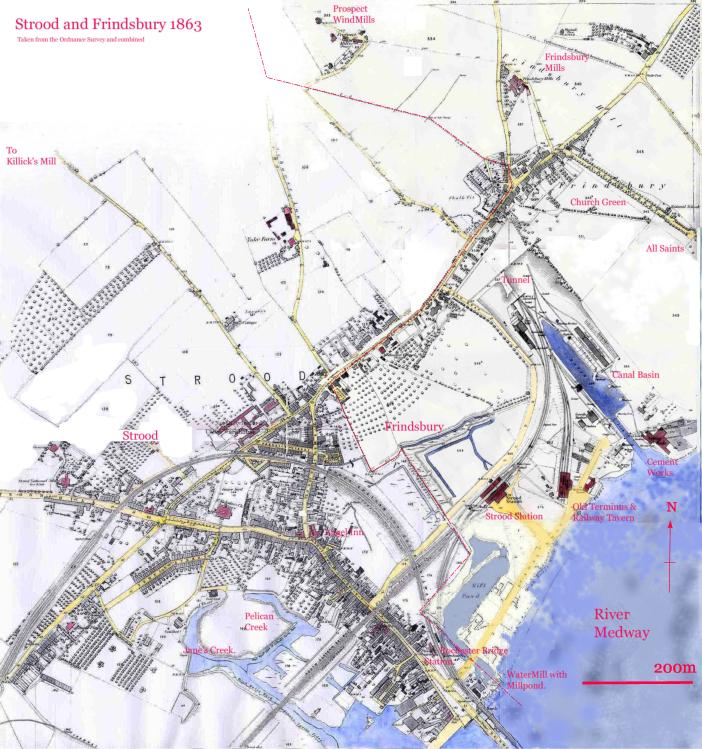
1863 Map of Strood and Frindsbury: note the undrained land between the railway and Frindsbury Hill, the creeks behind the Civic Centre and the lack of houses.

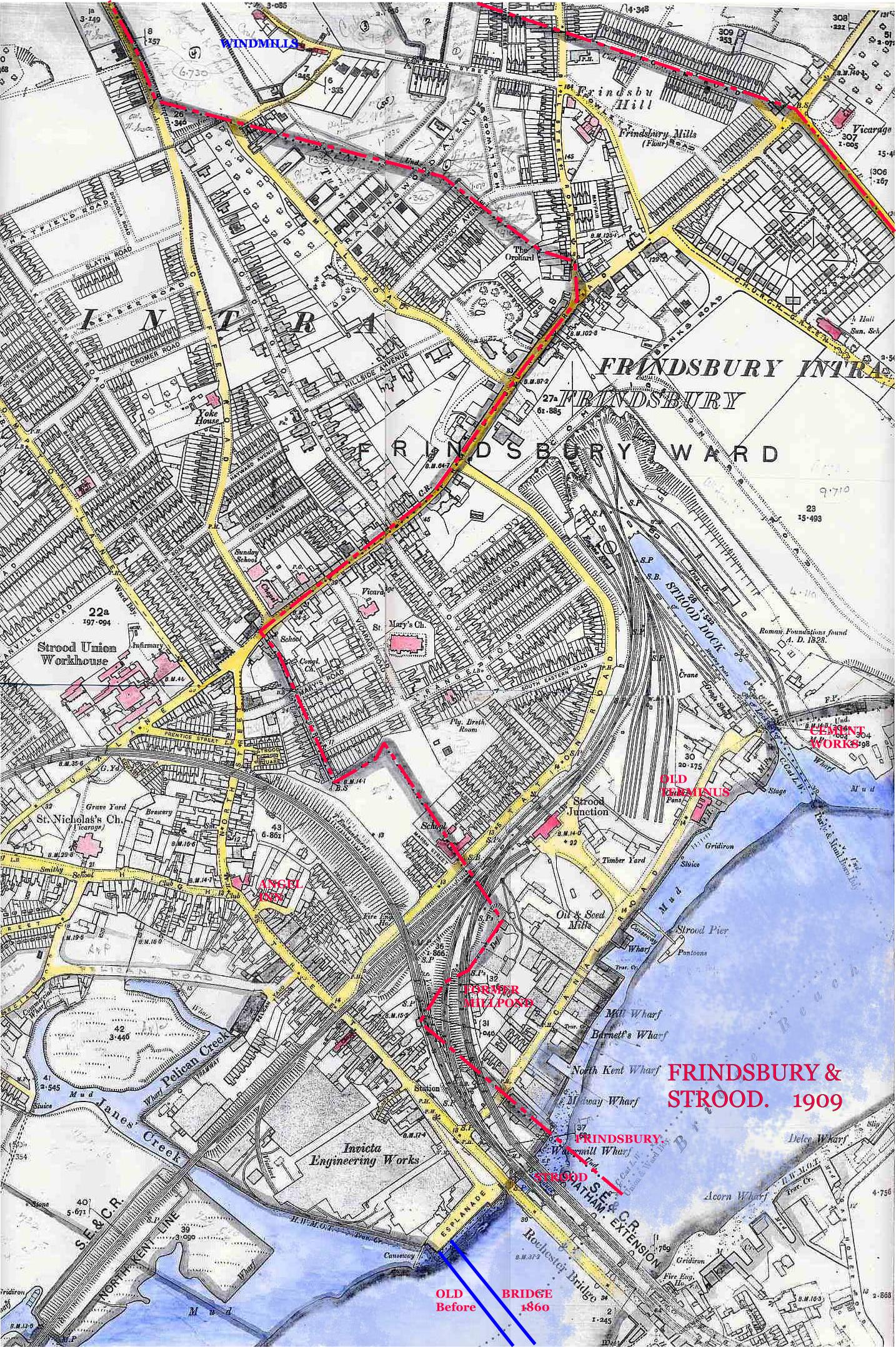
1909 Map of Strood and Frindsbury: note the growth in houses. There is no separation between Strood and Frindsbury, an extra church in Frindsbury parish to accommodate the new houses, and note also how Jane's Creek has been developed; later this will be back filled to provide land for retail.

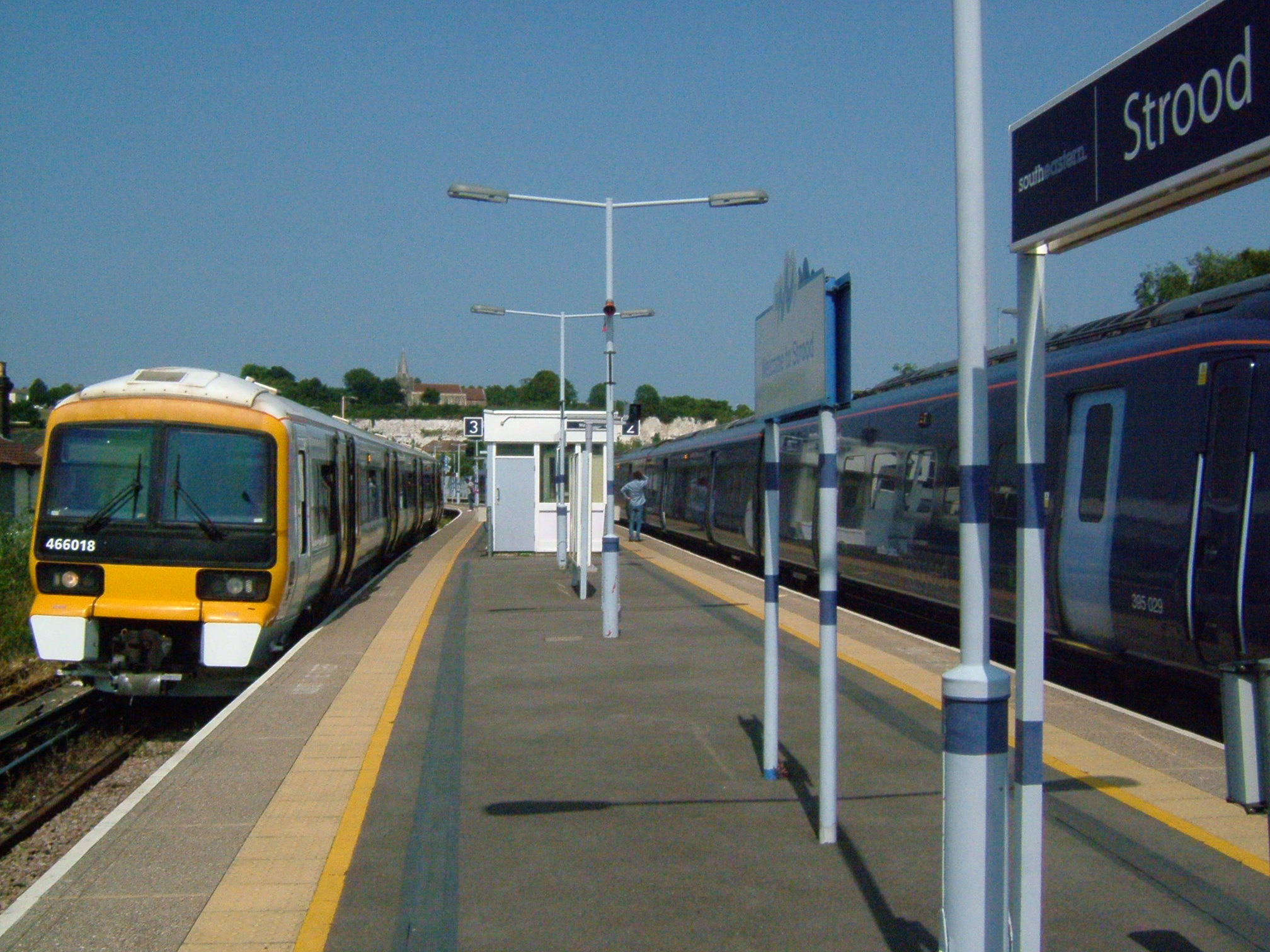
A British Rail Class 466 unit and a British Rail Class 395 unit at Strood railway station

=== River ===
Transport in Strood was dominated by the river. From the earliest times river transport used Strood, but before the coming of the Romans the area was marshy and not well populated. Once Strood started to be filled in various boatyards and ship repair businesses started up both on the river and in the creeks which drain the marshes.

=== Road ===
Although Strood must have lain on ancient tracks, the coming of the Romans started to fix the road pattern. The lowest bridging point of the River Medway is between Strood and Rochester, and the first bridge was built soon after the Battle of the Medway. This road from Dover via Longdon towards north Wales became known as Watling Street and forms two of the major highways of the Kingdom. The section from Dover to London became the A2 trunk road.

The 20th century has seen a major expansion in road transport and the consequent building of the M2 motorway. The route roughly parallels the old A2 and has necessitated the building of two high level bridges in Strood to the south of the town.

Beyond the M2 is the M20 motorway leading to the south of London and accessible by major roads from Strood.

Strood is on National Cycle Route 1.

=== Canal ===
The Thames and Medway Canal was dug between 1804 and 1824 to provide a safe route between the rivers Medway and Thames. Barges were able to avoid the long passage into the Thames Estuary and around the Isle of Grain. At the Strood end the Thames and Medway Canal was entered through a lock into Frindsbury Basin and then entered the Thames and Medway Tunnel. It opened on 4 October 1824.

The Thames and Medway Canal was 8 ft deep (2.4 m) with 27-foot (8.2 m) headroom and 26 ft 6 in (8.08 m) wide, to take 94-foot-long (29 m), 60-ton Thames Barges. It had a 5-foot (1.5 m) tow path its entire length. Spoil from the Thames and Medway Tunnel was used to infill the marshland between St Mary's Church Strood and the River Medway. Frindsbury Basin could handle vessels to 300 tons. A steam pump was installed there to keep the Thames and Medway Canal topped up.

Commercially the venture was a failure, because tolls were high to recoup the cost, entry to the Frindsbury Basin and others could only occur at high tides (making it quicker to sail the 47 miles (76 km) round the Isle of Grain). With the end of the Napoleonic Wars the military justification had also been removed.

In 1844 a single line railway was laid through the Thames and Medway Tunnel, on part of the towpath and part of a timber structure over the Thames and Medway Canal. The canal was sold in 1845 to the South Eastern Railway (SER), who filled in the Thames and Medway Canal within the passageway and laid a double track (see North Kent Line).

=== Rail ===
The South Eastern Railway terminated at Strood, with passengers taking a steamer or coaches to reach Rochester or Chatham. The station, completed 10 February 1856, was opposite The Railway Tavern. More recently it was called the Old Terminus.

On 18 June 1856, the line was extended along the river bank to Maidstone, and Strood Station we see today, was opened (see Medway Valley Line). Also in 1856 the new road bridge over the Medway was opened, in its present position, back where the Roman bridge had been. In 1857 the mediaeval bridge was demolished the stone being used to build the Strood Esplanade in 1858. In 1860 the SER built the Strood pier.

The East Kent Railway had permission to run a line from Faversham to Chatham, and intended to connect with the South Eastern Railway at Strood. When negotiations failed, the East Kent, now called the London Chatham and Dover (LCDR), linked with the Mid Kent Co. at Bromley (see Chatham Main Line). The East Kent Railway built a bridge over the Medway (1853) and taking their line to the North of the Angel, over Gun Lane, and Watling Street then south to Cuxton where it followed the Bush Valley and hence to Sole Street. The London Chatham and Dover built a station on the A2, adjacent to Canal Road, this was called

- Strood Station, when it was built, 30 September 1860, then
- Rochester Bridge Station, 1 April 1861, then
- Rochester & Strood, 1 November 1861, then
- Rochester Bridge (Strood), 31 March 1862, then
- Rochester Bridge, 1 October 1905

The South Eastern Railway retaliated by building a parallel bridge (after 1866 and before 1909) and running a separate line into Chatham. To do this the Watermill was demolished and the Mill Pond filled in. Over the pond was built an Oil and Seed Mill with its own sidings.

There was a loop between the lines at Strood, opened 29 March 1859 which closed in 1860. In 1875 Mayor N. E. Toomer forced the two companies to reopen the loop, now nicknamed Toomers Loop. The service resumed 1 April 1877.

The SER and LCDR effectively merged on 1 January 1899 to form the South Eastern and Chatham Railway. Subsequent rationalisation saw the closure of the SER branch to Chatham, and the closure of the LCDR Strood station. The SER bridge over the Medway was retained for the Chatham Main Line, and the LCDR bridge was abandoned (its piers were later used for the second road bridge). The link between the two lines was used to run services from the Chatham line onto the North Kent Line.

For the current railway station see Strood railway station.

== River and the Strood Basin ==
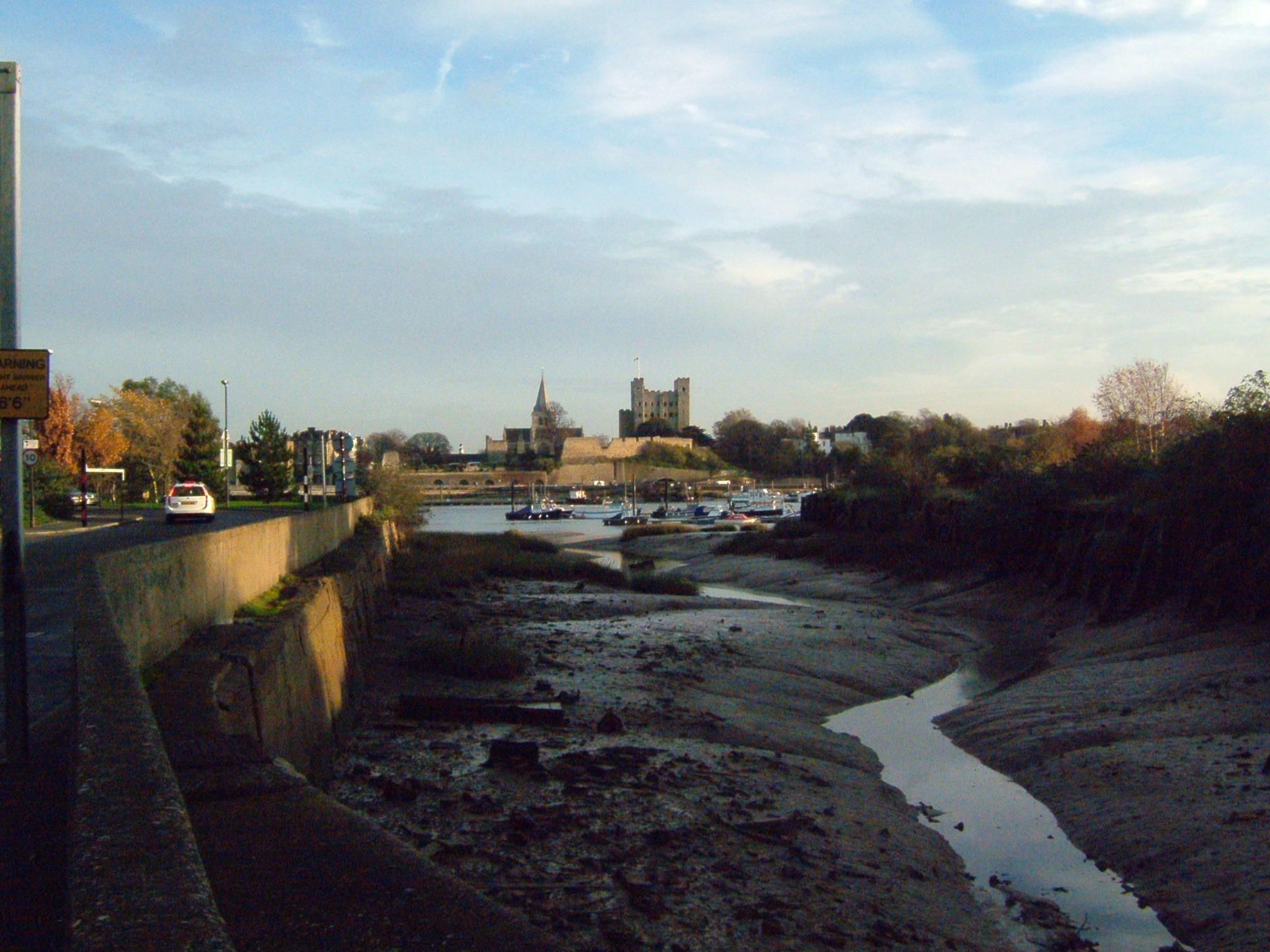
The remains of Jane's Creek in 2006

All Strood below The Angel Inn, on North Street, near Strood Post Office, was built on marshland which was fed by small creeks, these were excavated to make usable jetties and wharf. Two such creeks are well known, Janes Creek which once extended back to the Cricketers Inn, and Temple Creek. Joining Janes Creek, at a right angle was Pelican Creek which has been in-filled and now forms a car park and the foundations of B & M. Strood frequently flooded and the area around Temple Street (now a car park and a Tesco) was known as the 'Swamp'.

Significant floods were recorded in Strood in the years 1158, 1235, 1309, 1682, 1735, 1791, 1854, 1874, 1887, 1953, 1968 and 1979.

William Curel was Medway's oldest established barge builder, with two yards on the Strood bank. The Curel's Upper Yard was next to the Railway Tavern. In 1900 Gill and Son took over the yard, and it became a sail loft.

== Mills ==
There was a windmill on Strood Hill, two on Broom Hill and five in neighbouring Frindsbury.

- The Strood Hill Mill was a smock mill that was demolished in 1860. It was unsuitably sited, and suffered from variable winds The site now forms part of the Cedars Hotel.
- Killicks Mill on Broom Hill cap was blown off for the second time in 1880. It was replaced and worked again for a year in 1890 but was unprofitable and was probably demolished in the 1920s. It had six sides rather than the usual eight.
- Fields Mill on Broom Hill burnt down in 1875. In Dickens' times, the Miller was a Mr Clark, but the owner was Mr Field. Mr Field was an amateur musician, who kept a piano, a harp and a barrel organ in his sitting room. It is said that the organ was bought from Loose Church, and so fixed that the power from the mill turned the organ's handle. Dickens would visit the mill on his walks, and listen to the organ music.

The Frindsbury Mills.

- The oldest was a tripod – or post mill. It was called the Quarry Mill and was 100 yards south east of the church. Destroyed in 1850.

The other four mills were all owned by Mr Kimmins.

- On Prospect Hill there were two mills. The first was called Manwaring Mill, or Little Mill. It was a black tarred smock mill, and it drove four sets of stones. Little Mill was struck by lightning and demolished in 1886.
- Also on Prospect Hill was Great Mill or Rose's Mill. It was the highest in Kent with 40 feet by nine feet sweeps. Together the two mills produced 400 sacks of flour a week. Great Mill was demolished in 1890.
- Kimmin's Mill on Frindsbury Hill was a smock mill with no base. The land became a brick field. A man was killed by its sweeps.
- House Mill, also known as Kimmins Mill or Frindsbury Mill, stood on Frindsbury hill and was a black smock mill. It was demolished in 1931.

There was a tidemill. When the tide was rising, water flowed into the mill pond driving a mill, when the tide was falling, water flowed back into the river, driving the mill.

== Horticulture ==
The damson cultivar 'Farleigh Damson' has gained the Royal Horticultural Society's Award of Garden Merit.

- 'Farleigh Damson' (syn. 'Crittenden's Prolific', 'Strood Cluster') is named after the village of East Farleigh in Kent, where it was raised by James Crittenden in the early 19th century. An 1871 letter to the Journal of horticulture and practical gardening claimed that the original seedling had been found by a Mr. Herbert, the tenant of a market garden in Strood, who had given it to Crittenden. It has small, roundish, black fruit, with a blue bloom, and is a very heavy bearer. Its heavy cropping led to it being widely planted in England.

== Housing ==
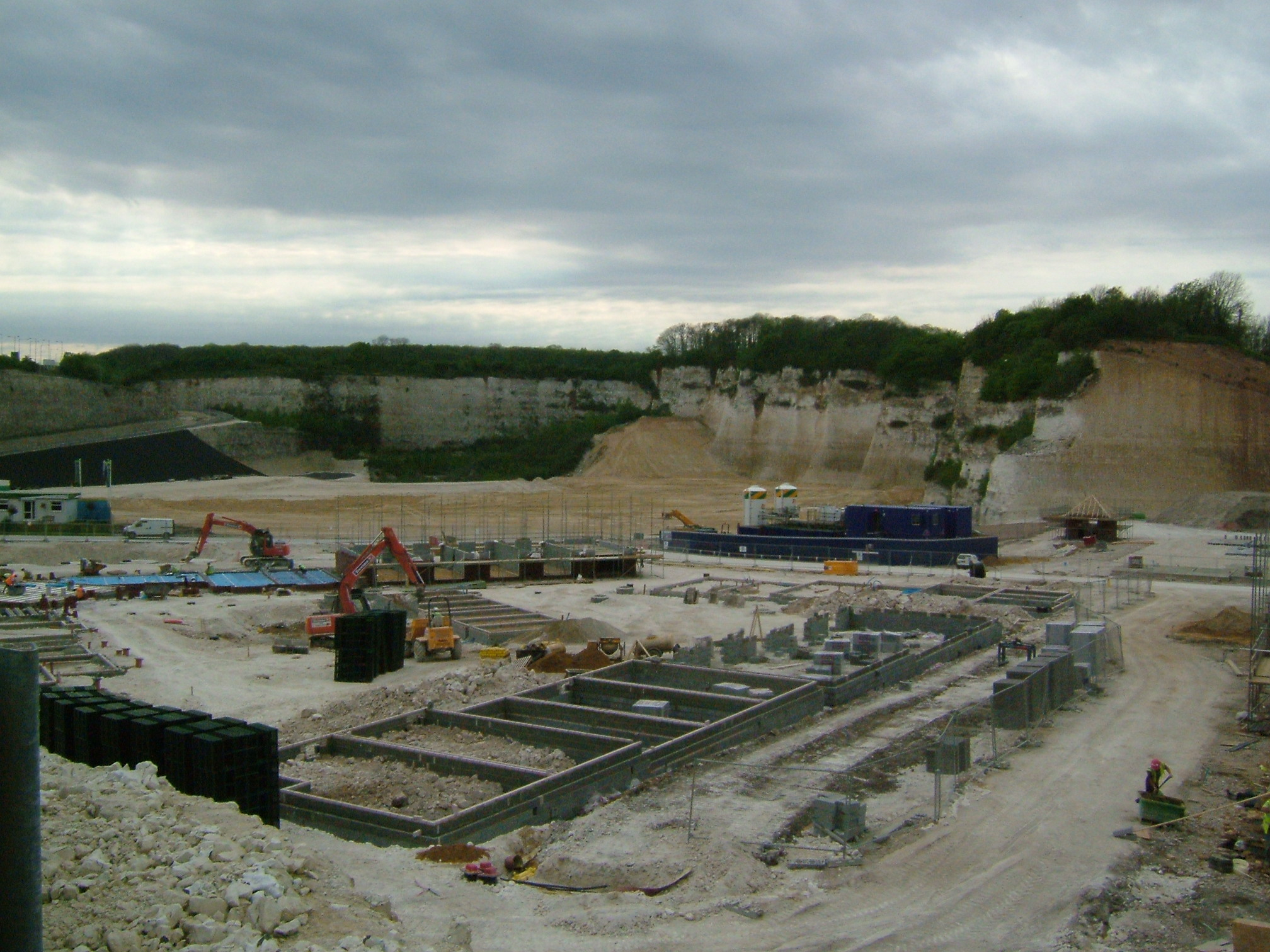
Work progresses on the foundations of the first houses in the Medway Gate Housing Development.

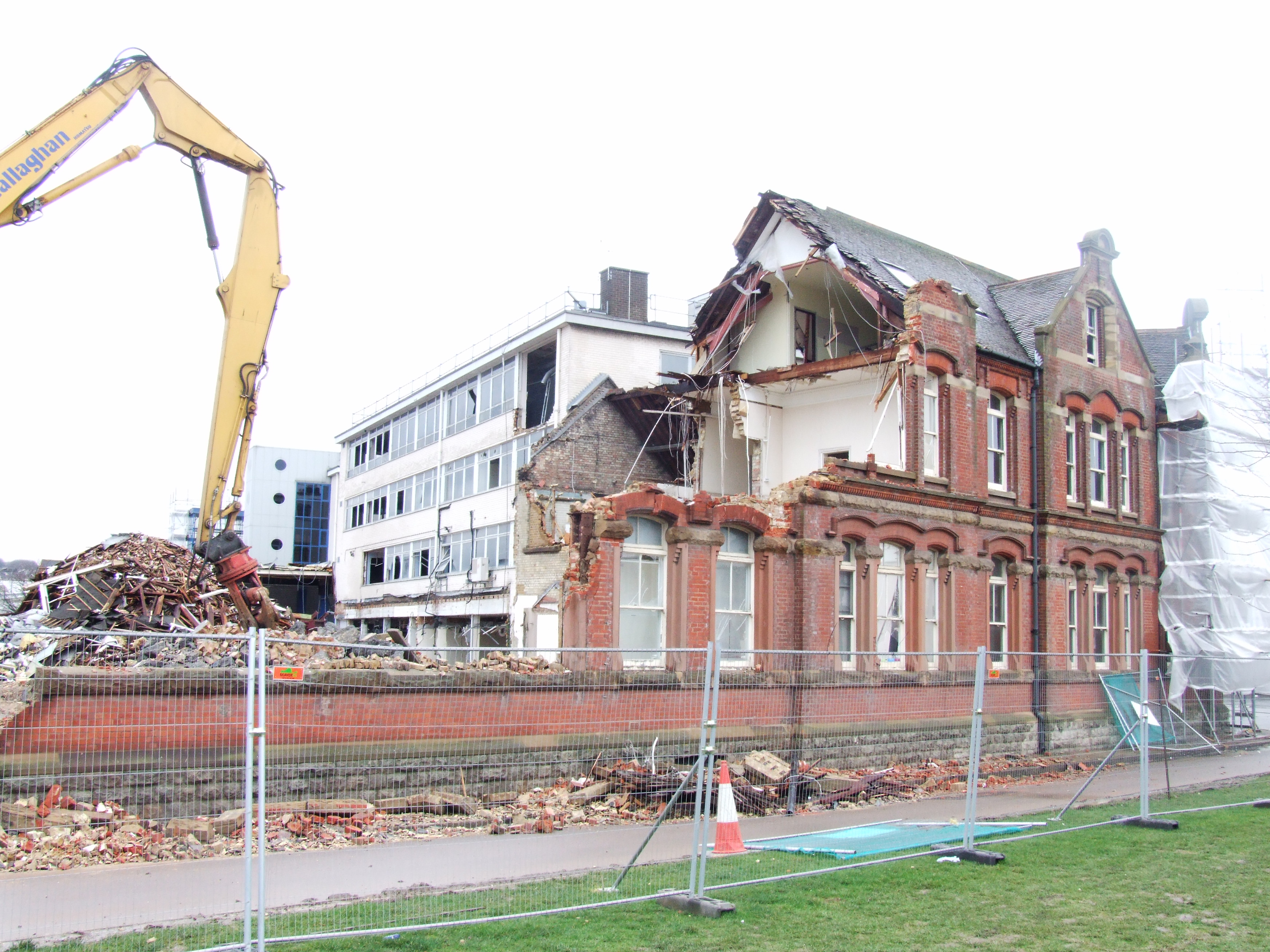
The former Edwardian Aveling & Porter building, February 2010

The area of Strood around Knights Place and Temple Street, was referred to as the Swamp. On the floods Henry Smetham wrote in 1899 "in that woebegone spot the foul contents of water closets were washed into poor peoples homes, and an indescribable filth permeated the fetid spot for months". On 2 August 1912 there was a typhoid outbreak which began at Alma Place, just off Knight Road, and 56 residents contracted it, and five died.

From November 1882 to March 1886, there was a major expansion of houses. Terraced houses were built on the hill, closing the gap between Strood and Frindsbury. The land around St Mary's, now drained and close to the Strood Railway Station was used. There was a mix of house sizes, from the large detached to the small terraces that opened on the street. They were all built in local yellow brick, with detailing in reds.

Following World War 1, the city built 19 houses in Steele Street, and 73 on Frindsbury Hill (Murray Road). Following World War 2, under the Housing (Financial and Miscellaneous Provisions) Act 1946, and the Housing Subsidies Act 1956 the city continued to build, including the triangle between the A228, Watling Street and the M2.

With continuing population growth and pressure from commuters, more and more land has been developed by the private sector. By 31 December 2000, the riverside by the Strood Railway Station had been developed. Kingswear Gardens off Canal Road is a social housing estate. Kingswear Gardens is a high crime area, and is prone to flooding. The chalkpit by the A228 at Merral's Shaw now has 400 dwellings on it, in spite of the massive infrastructure work needed, (roads and landscaping) this development is called Medway Gate. In February 2009, plans were in existence to build over the Temple Marsh, adjacent to Knight Road in Strood. Up to 620 homes are planned to be built and up to 12,300 sq metres of mixed-use employment and retail floorspace to develop. Now renamed as 'Temple Waterfront'.

There are concerns for the architectural heritage in Frindsbury and Strood. A sad loss of an Edwardian gem occurred when Medway Council demolished the Aveling & Porter building in September 2010 to make way for a temporary car park.

== Education ==
Strood Academy is the only secondary school in Strood. For secondary education, many pupils from Strood attend schools in neighbouring towns.

== Churches ==
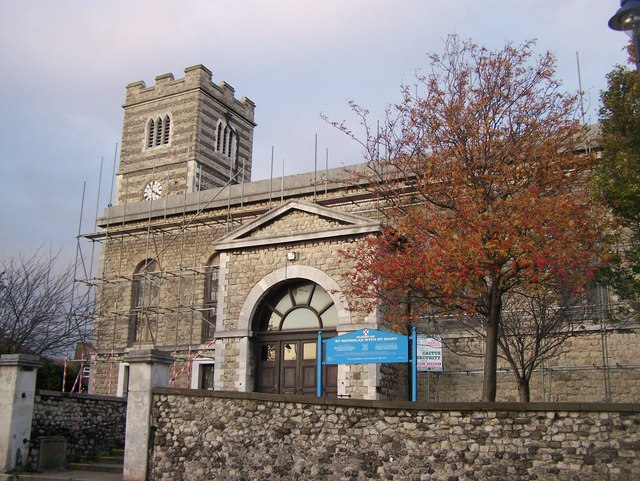
Grade II listed St Nicholas Church, Strood

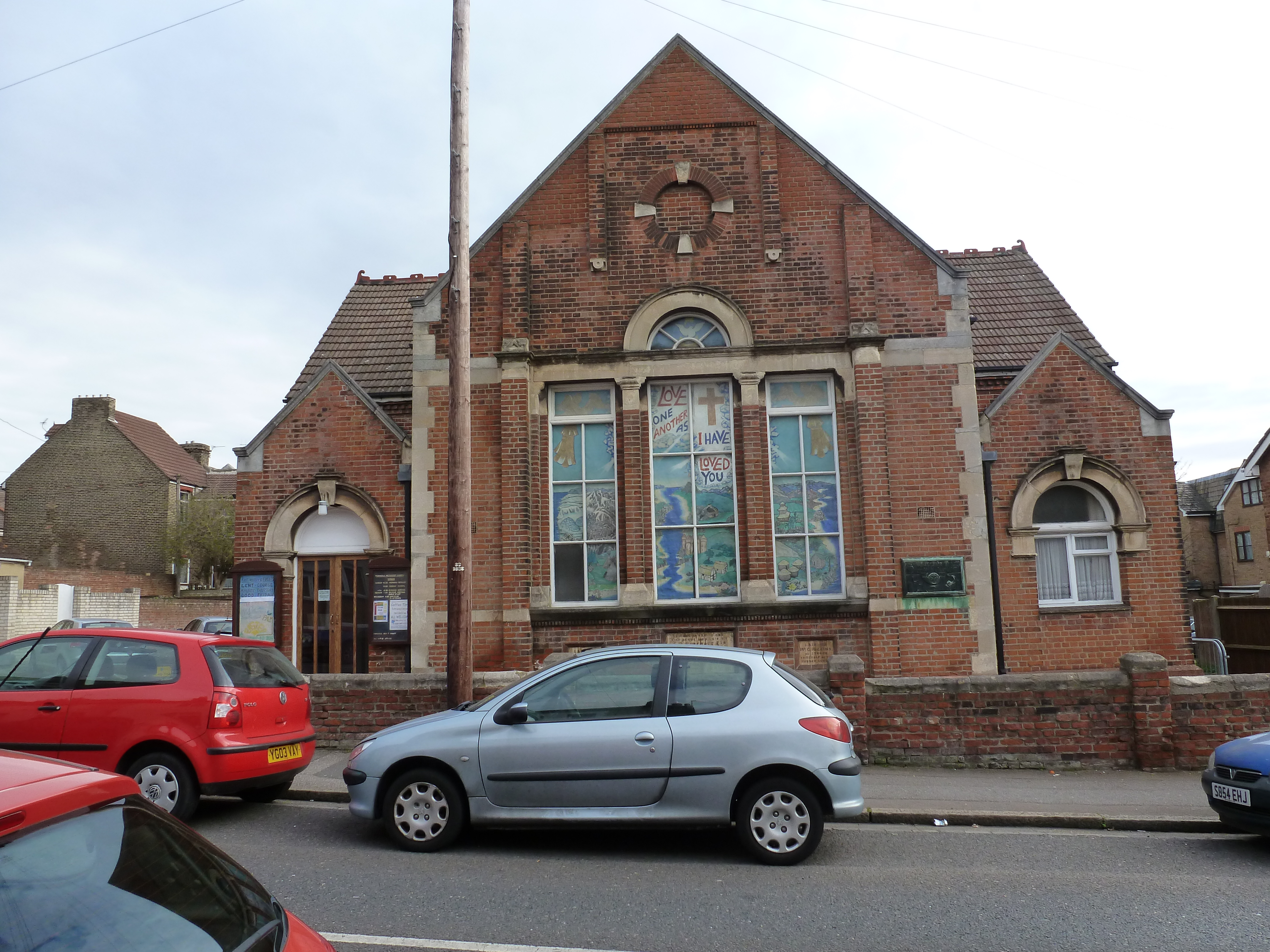
Front elevation of Strood Methodist Church

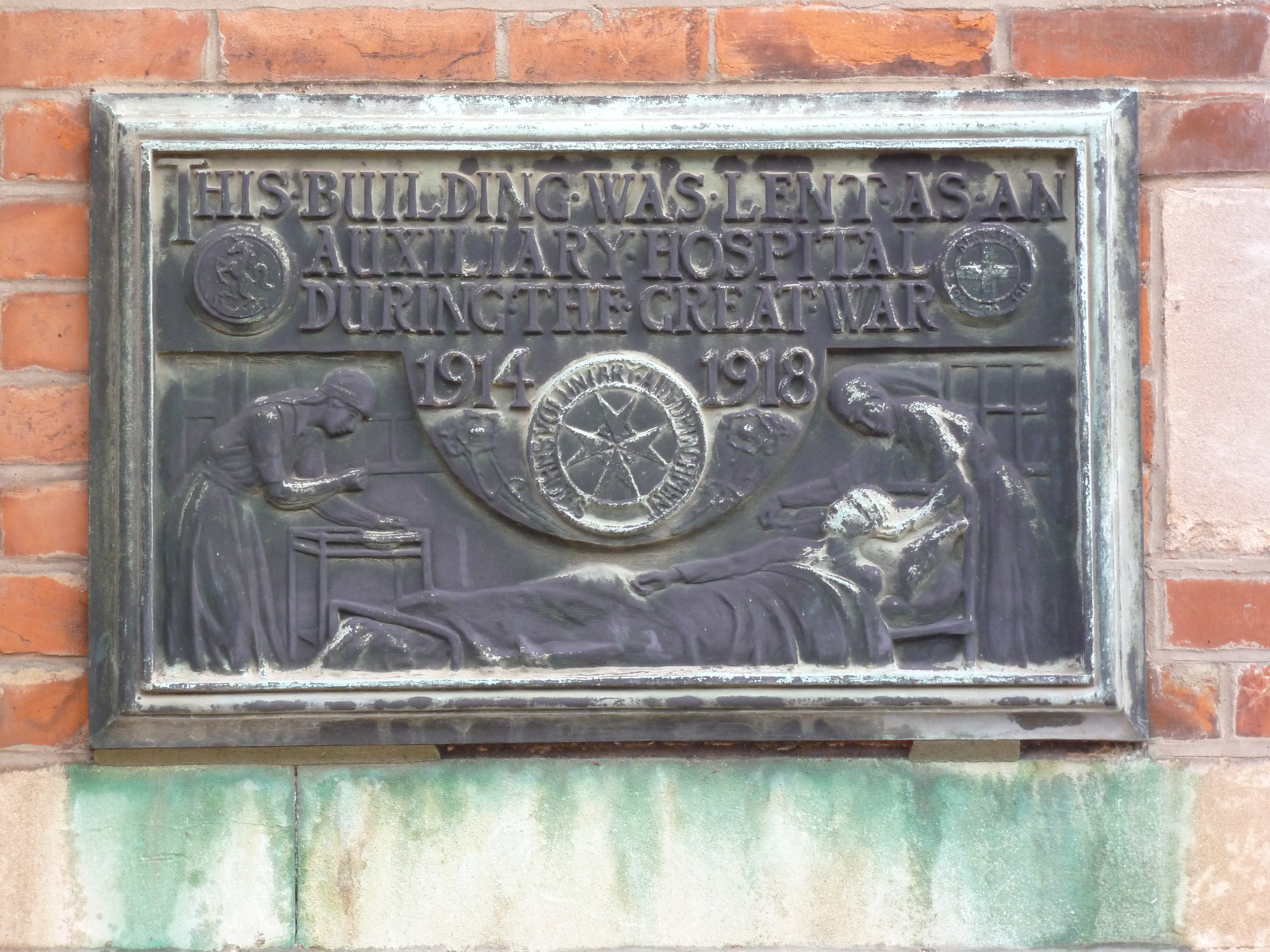
Plaque recording the use of the church as an auxiliary hospital during the Great War 1914–1918

The parish church for Strood is St Nicholas College Yard Strood which is Grade II listed building. St. Nicholas Church is located next to the building which the supermarket Asda and homeware retailer Wilko occupy. The building was previously occupied by Safeway until April 2005. St Mary's (notionally Frindsbury) was opened by Bishop Claughton in 1869 as a Chapel of Ease. It has subsequently closed as an Anglican Church but has been taken over by the New Testament Church of God. The other Anglican Church in the area is St. Francis of Assisi.

There is a historic Roman Catholic Church. English Martyrs Church was rebuilt in 1964 in the style of Brutalist Architecture. In recent years it has been featured in articles and books as an early example of this style used for a Roman Catholic Church.

The Methodist Church in Stonehouse Lane has undergone two changes of name. First the road name changed to Cliffe Road and then the Methodist Church changed from "Jubilee" to "Peninsular". During the First World War the church was lent to the St John's Voluntary Aid Department as an auxiliary hospital.

Protestant dissenters founded the Zoar Chapel in October 1782. There is a Gospel Mission Evangelical Church in Brompton Lane and an Evangelical Church in Darnley Road.

== Media ==
Regional local news and television programmes are provided by BBC South East and ITV Meridian. Television signals are received from the Bluebell Hill TV transmitter.

Local radio stations are BBC Radio Kent on 96.7 FM, Heart South on 103.1 FM, Gold Radio on 1242 AM and KMFM Medway which broadcast from its studios in the town on 100.4 FM.

The town is served by these local newspapers:

- Medway Messenger
- Medway Times
- yourmedway

== Sport and leisure ==
Non-League football club Rochester United F.C., formerly Bly Spartans, plays at Bly Spartans Sports Ground in Strood. The club is in the Kent League, at level nine of the English football league system. Gillingham FC, in EFL's League One is the local professional team, being located approximately three miles from central Strood. Strood has a sports centre with astroturf floodlit football pitches.

== People ==
- Lucy Ann Brooks (1835–1926), the temperance advocate, was born in Strood. She was a co-founder and president of the Women's Total Abstinence Union.
- Isaac Newell (Strood, 24 April 1853 – Rosario, Argentina, 16 October 1907) a teacher and a pioneer of football in Argentina. He was the founder of the Colegio Comercial Anglicano Argentino and the founder of Argentinean football club Newell's Old Boys

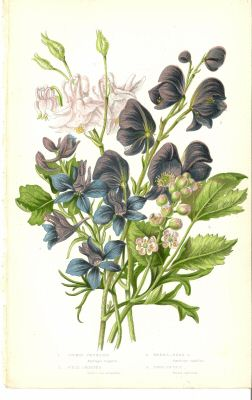
An illustration of flowers including Columbine and larkspur by Anne Pratt

- Anne Pratt (1806–1893), the botanist, was born in Strood. She wrote several books in the 19th century covering a wide range of botanical subjects.
- Charles Roach Smith (1806–1890) notable amateur archaeologist, died in Strood.After his death, four streets in Strood were named in his honour, Charles Street, Smith Street, Roach Street and Antiquarian Street.

== See also ==
- Gillingham
- Listed buildings in Medway, non civil parish (Frindsbury, Rochester, Strood)
- Rainham
