= Strood Rural District =

Former local government area in the UK

Coordinates: 51°24′14″N 0°30′17″E

Strood
- Area
  - 1911: 32,498 acres (131.51 km^{2})
  - 1931: 32,499 acres (131.52 km^{2})
  - 1961: 48,572 acres (196.56 km^{2})
- Population
  - 1911: 15,354
  - 1931: 16,158
  - 1961: 28,760
- Density
  - 1911: 0.47/acre
  - 1931: 0.50/acre
  - 1961: 0.59/acre
- History
  - Origin: Strood Rural Sanitary District
  - Created: 1894
  - Abolished: 1974
  - Succeeded by: Medway, Gravesham
- Status: Rural district
- Government: Strood Rural District Council
  - HQ: Frindsbury Road, Frindsbury Extra
  - Motto: SPES PATRIAE RUS

Strood Rural District was a rural district in the county of Kent, England.

It was subject to boundary reforms in 1934 and 1935.

It consisted of the following civil parishes:

- Allhallows (1935–1974; gained from Hoo Rural District)
- Chalk (1894–1935; abolished and transferred to the Municipal Borough of Gravesend)
- Cliffe
- Cobham
- Cooling (1935–1974; gained from Hoo Rural District)
- Cuxton
- Denton (1894–1935; abolished and transferred to the Municipal Borough of Gravesend)
- Frindsbury Extra (part transferred to the City of Rochester in 1934)
- Halling
- Higham
- High Halstow (1935–1974; gained from Hoo Rural District)
- Hoo St Werburgh (1935–1974; gained from Hoo Rural District)
- Ifield (1894–1935; abolished and split between Cobham and the Municipal Borough of Gravesend)
- Isle of Grain (1935–1974; gained from Hoo Rural District)
- Luddesdown
- Meopham
- Nurstead
- Shorne
- St Mary Hoo (1935–1974; gained from Hoo Rural District)
- Stoke (1935–1974; gained from Hoo Rural District)
- Strood Extra (1894–1934; abolished and split between Cuxton and the City of Rochester)

On 1 April 1974 the district was abolished and split between the new districts of Medway and Gravesham.
