= Walderslade =

Suburb of Chatham, Kent, England

Coordinates: 51.336070°N 0.521660°E

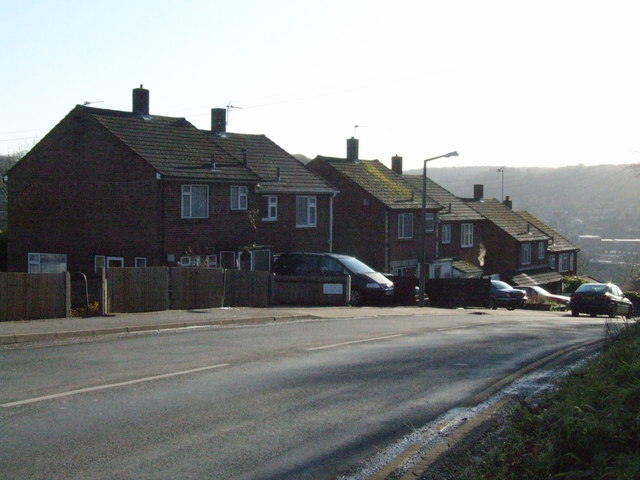

- Location within Kent
- Population: 9,520 (2011.Ward)
- OS grid reference: TQ755625
- District: Maidstone; Tonbridge and Malling
- Unitary authority: Medway
- Ceremonial county: Kent
- Region: South East
- Country: England
- Sovereign state: United Kingdom
- Post town: CHATHAM
- Postcode district: ME5
- Dialling code: 01634
- Police: Kent
- Fire: Kent
- Ambulance: South East Coast
- UK Parliament: Chatham and Aylesford

Walderslade is a large suburb of Chatham split between the unitary authority of Medway and the boroughs of Maidstone and Tonbridge & Malling in South East England. It was, until 1998, fully part of Kent and is still ceremonially associated via the Lieutenancies Act. It encompasses almost all the ME5 postcode district (except parts of Luton).

Walderslade was originally a farm nestled in the valleys of the North Downs, with the farmhouse still standing on what is now Princes Avenue. In the late 1800s, the farmland was sold as small holdings, leading to the formation of a small rural village. After the First World War, development accelerated with the expansion of towns in Medway. The urban area developed rapidly after the Second World War, resulting in the current layout of several large estates surrounding the original farmhouse and village, which is the local centre of commerce.

Walderslade comprises several named areas, notably the Davis Estate (near Rochester Airport), Wayfield, Weeds Wood, Walderslade Woods, Princes Avenue and Lordswood.

== History ==
An important Bronze Age hoard was found in Walderslade in 1965 during house construction. Comprising two gold penannular bracelets, it is now in the collections of the British Museum. The name Walderslade is English (Old or Middle), and means 'wood in a valley'.

Walderslade Valley or Bottom – is one of several dry chalk valleys in the area, that were created during past ice ages as a result of melting ice when England was still joined with the continent. During warmer post glacial periods, elephants and hippopotami roamed the valleys.

Walderslade valley was originally wooded, hence its name (Old or Middle English wald means 'wood'). Although over time the woodland became restricted primarily to the higher ground (Lord Wood, Dargets Wood and Hall or Hail Wood) – where substantial woodland remained until the area became subject to new housing development. This started in the early 1900s and expanded considerably from the 1950s onwards. It is possible that the Romans (who were present in nearby Luton) were the first to start the clearance of woodland in the valley. The southern (Boxley) end of the valley – still retains some woodland. Google Earth Historical Imagery option shows the extent of local woodland as it existed in the 1940s and 1960s.

There were originally four farms in the Walderslade and surrounding areas, including Walderslade Farm and Settington Farm – which both existed within Walderslade Valley. Also Gibraltar Farm and Shawstead Farm (the last two still exist in a nearby valley). Shawstead Farm (and probably others in the area) were associated with the clearance of local woodland to help supply Chatham Dockyard with oak for the building of wooden sailing ships. Chatham dockyard constructed ships such as HMS Victory, launched at Chatham in 1765. Most of the larger and more valuable oak trees would have existed in the richer soil of the Valley bottoms and slopes (Walderslade, Shawstead etc.) where the farms were typically located. The ruins of Upper Shawstead Farm are now within the boundary of Capstone Farm Country Park. Most of this farmland belonged to Shawstead Manor. Settington Farm was located close to where Morrisons Supermarket now stands in Walderslade Valley and existed up until the 1950s. Walderslade farm existed close to where Walderslade village exists today and extended along the Valley to Settington Farm. The 16th century Walderslade manor farmhouse still exists as a Grade II listed property, known as The Homestead.

== Governance ==
Most of Walderslade is within Medway, a unitary authority within the ceremonial county boundaries of Kent. Parts of Walderslade are, however, in different parishes and thus in different local government districts.

- The southernmost parts of Weeds Wood and the eastern bulk of Walderslade Woods are in Aylesford parish and thus in the borough of Tonbridge and Malling (formerly Malling Rural District).
- The eastern parts of Walderslade Woods and southern parts of Lordswood are in Boxley parish, in the borough of Maidstone.

== Geography ==
Walderslade is separated from the rest of the Medway towns by a green belt incorporating Rochester Airport, Horsted Farm and the Coney Banks to the north. There is a small link via Luton, which is connected to Wayfield and Princes Avenue estates. To the east is Capstone country park, a valley preserved from development (although formerly a large landfill). This clearly separates Gillingham and Hempstead from Walderslade. To the south the M2 motorway completes the encirclement of Walderslade.

=== Walderslade village ===
The centre of Walderslade village consists of St William's Church, a health centre including doctors' surgeries, a Co-op supermarket, a public house (The Oak), a number of estate agents and takeaway outlets (currently Indian, kebab, two Chinese and a fish and chip shop), a Dominoes, as well as an Indian restaurant, newsagent, off-licence, chemist, café, dry cleaners, hairdressers', post office, coffee shop, barber's shop, petrol station (containing a small supermarket), a public library, Demelza charity shop, and a nursery called Buttercups located above the florist. There is ample free public car parking offered by the Co-op supermarket and also in front of most of the shops with other parking behind the shops making access convenient for people with children or people with physical disabilities. The church is also used as St William's Pre-School during the school terms.

On the outskirts of Walderslade village, a couple of minutes walk away, is Princes Park recreation ground.

On the outskirts are the Alexandra Hospital (Spire – no A&E) – see Walderslade Woods, the Bridgewood Hotel, the Walderslade Working Men's Club.

Also, opposite the Poacher's Pocket (formerly called the Hook and Hatchet) public house is a playing field (formerly known as Hook Meadow) which used to be part of the Walderslade prisoner of war camp during the Second World War.

=== Princes Park ===
Princes Park is lower down the valley to the north. It has a community hall, pub, newsagents, Indian Takeaway and a supermarket (currently Morrisons, formerly Safeway), petrol station, 2 primary schools (Maundene and Kingfisher) and a Church (Christ the King). The original farm house, which is a mid 17th century, Grade II listed building, can still be seen by the observant on Princes Avenue itself closer to the centre of Walderslade village, on the corner of Dargets Road. The closer Settingdon Farm (pre 1950s) was sited almost exactly where Morrisons supermarket now stands.

=== Davis Estate ===
The Davis Estate has a community hall, a parade of shops including a post office, newsagents; several takeaways, the Tiger Moth pub and a garage. Neighbouring is the Horsted retail park where several large retailers are located and a hotel (Holiday Inn), close by is a large Asda superstore and a further hotel, the Bridgewood Manor.

=== Walderslade Woods ===
Walderslade Woods (aka little nel's woods) is a recent development, begun before the 1970s, to the south of the village near the M2 motorway. It is hemmed in by a road, also confusingly named "Walderslade Woods" (the A2045), the only part of the incomplete Medway Towns southern relief road. (The northern relief road is a complete dual carriageway.) There are a few corner shops and one school (Tunbury Primary School), but plans have existed for more shops and at least one further primary and secondary school. There is a private hospital, the Spire Alexandra. The area is at the intersection of Medway unitary borough, Maidstone borough and Tonbridge and Malling borough – thus there are two community halls.

Walderslade Woodlands are made up of three valleys, and five plateaux, which are all to the north of Walderslade Woods (road). The three valleys are Tunbury (most western), Cossington and Round Wood (most eastern), and these are all classified as ancient woodlands. The five plateaux were made when the M2 and Walderslade Woods (road) were constructed, and so are significantly different from the rest of the woodlands, and also different from each other. The whole area is now protected by having Village Green Status, and so cannot be developed by Kent County Council – the landowners. The Walderslade Woodlands Group (WWG) is voluntary group who manage and maintain the woodlands.

=== Weedswood ===
Weedswood, to the north and north west of Walderslade village, has a parade of shops, the Poacher's Pocket pub and a kebab shop famed locally for being housed in what once was a public toilet. Greenacre and Walderslade Girls secondary schools are in the area, along with Oaklands Primary School. There are two churches, Emmanuel (Congregational Federation) and St. Philip & St. James (Church of England), and a community hall and public library which back on to Hook Meadow, a public playing field.

=== Wayfield Estate ===
Wayfield is an estate based around two through roads—Wayfield Road and Churchill Avenue—with several smaller roads linking them. The estate is to the north of Weedswood above and alongside the Princes Avenue area. It has several small shops, a woodyard, golf driving range with a pitch and putt golf course, a Fitness First gym and a playing field. The estate also borders two areas of woodland; the Snodhurst wood and the Coney Banks. Currently a Charlton Athletic F.C. community project is being held there.

=== Lordswood ===
Lordswood is a large development, also to the east. It has direct access to Chatham via North Dane Way (B2156), which hems in Walderslade to the east. It has two separate shopping parades: one, centred on the Kestrel, also has a library, hairdressers, a recently refurbished health centre and a Tesco, the second is off Lordswood Lane, and includes a hairdresser, chip shop, bookmakers and general store. There is also a leisure centre off North Dane Way, with a park and playing field.

The wood of 'Lords Wood' originally (pre 1900) extended for approximately one mile by three quarters, located on high ground above the Walderslade valley with Lidsing at its south-south/east corner. Along with other local woodland, it was originally associated with a much larger wood called Great Cowbeck Woods. Before the area was cleared for housing, Lords Wood included dense woodland associated with difficult terrain, probably similar to other extensive wood land in the area at that time including the nearby Malling and Weeds Woods.

Running through the edge of the original woodland, Lords Wood Lane originally followed the brow of the hill above Walderslade Valley (and still does in places). Archaeological finds and other evidence in the area suggest that Lords Wood Lane may originate from at least the Bronze Age period and is probably the oldest lane in Walderslade. Lordswood still retains a small number of large mature trees saved from the clearance of woodland for housing and other purposes.

== Education ==
Primary schools in Walderslade include Swingate Primary School, Kingfisher Community Primary School, Maundene School, Oaklands Infant School, Oaklands Junior School, Tunbury Primary School, St Thomas More RCP and Walderslade Primary School. Secondary schools serving the area include Walderslade Girls' School and Greenacre Academy (boys).

== Transport ==
Access to Walderslade is off the M2 motorway at junction 3 and not far from junction 6 of the M20 motorway. This gives access to the Channel Tunnel and cross channel ferries as well as road and rail links to London, the M25 motorway, Dartford bridge/tunnel, Blackwall tunnel and the rest of Britain.

Bus services focus on the primary bus station of Medway, near to the Pentagon shopping centre in Chatham. Other routes provide links with the neighbouring town of Maidstone. There are also bus links to the Bluewater shopping centre between Dartford and Gravesend.

== Notable people ==
- Billy Childish, painter, writer and musician, grew up in Walderslade and attended Walderslade Secondary Boys' school in the 1970s.
- Steve Coast, OpenStreetMap founder, grew up in Walderslade.
- Chris Smalling grew up in Walderslade, played for Manchester United and England
- Steve Marsh Kent County Cricket Captain and Wicket-keeper grew up in Walderslade and attended Walderslade School.
