= A278 road =

Dual carriageway in Kent, England

A278

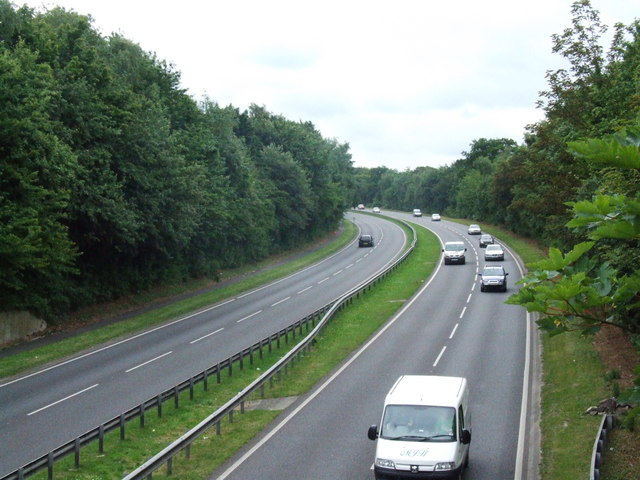
- Hoath Way A278 heading towards the M2 motorway

Route information
- Length: 3 mi (4.8 km)

Major junctions
- South end: Park Wood51.3685°N 0.580°E
- M2; A2
- North end: Gillingham51.3367°N 0.584°E

Location
- Country: United Kingdom
- Constituent country: England

Road network
- Roads in the United Kingdom; Motorways; A and B road zones

The A278 (Hoath Way) is a road running north–south in north Kent, England. The whole length of the road is dual carriageway, within Medway Council but is a non-primary route.

== History ==
The A278 was formerly used as the number for the Felbridge – Horsham road, which is now part of the A264. However, the A278 is now used for the 3-mile (4.8 km) long dual carriageway that links the M2 to the A2. The A278 was opened in March 1966.

== The route ==
The road begins at Junction 4 of the widened M2 (since 2003) where it travels in a northerly direction towards Gillingham. About 0.5 miles (0.80 km) along the route there is a roundabout, with road links to Hempstead and Hempstead Valley Shopping Centre on the left, and Wigmore on the right. The A278 continues as a dual carriageway travelling northwards. The route is generally surrounded by trees for much of its length.

The second roundabout hosts another exit for Wigmore on the right and Gillingham Business Park on the left. The road terminates 0.5 miles (0.80 km) further north at the large Bowaters Roundabout) with the A2, with links to Gillingham, Gillingham Business Park, Sittingbourne and the Medway Tunnel. The road itself provides a vital link between the eastern side of the Medway towns and the M2 motorway.
