= Capstone Farm Country Park =

Park in Kent, England

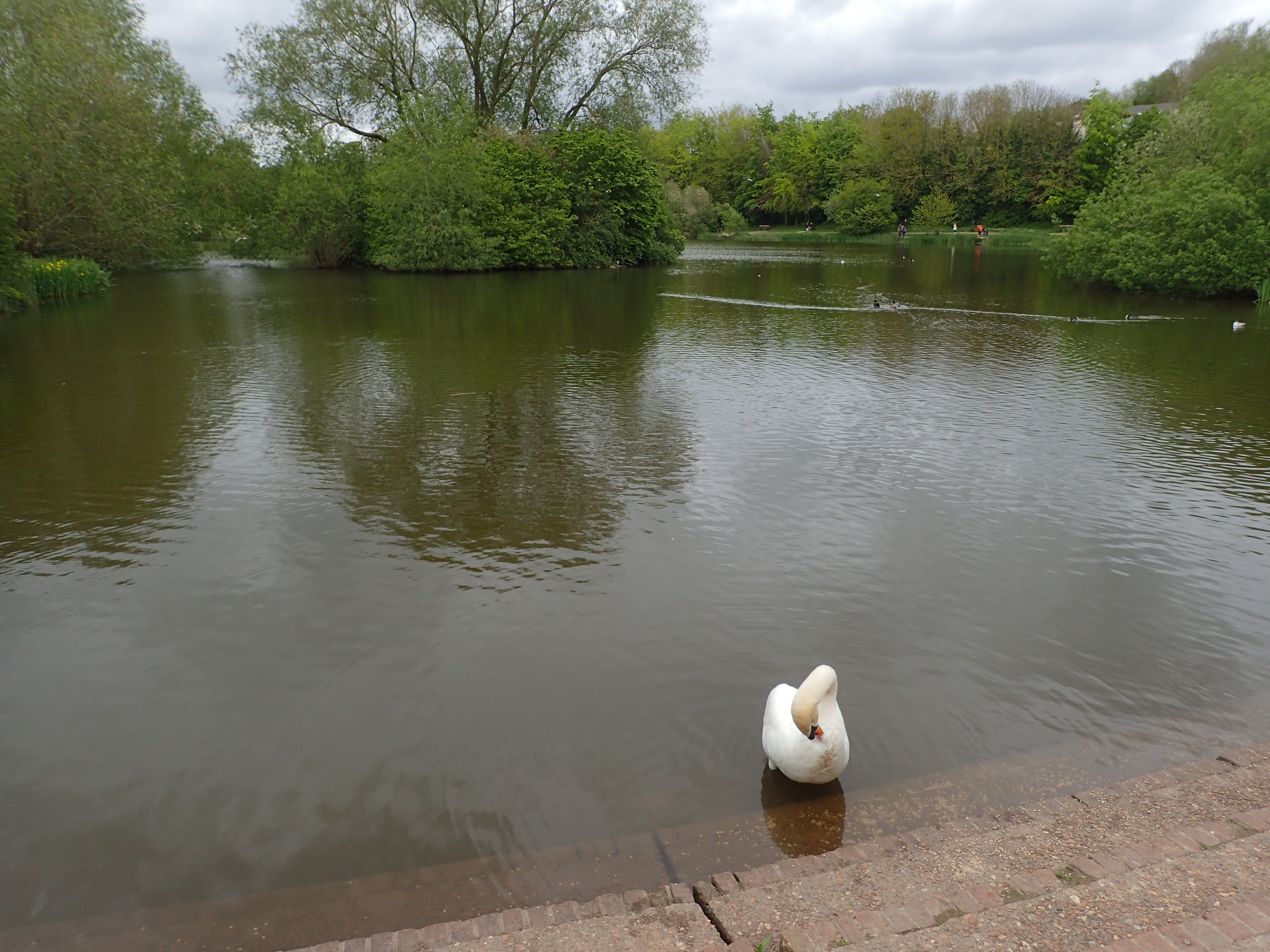
- The fishing lake within Capstone Park

- Location within Kent
- Interactive map of Capstone Farm Country Park
- OS grid: TQ780654
- Coordinates: 51°21′32″N 0°33′15″E
- Area: 114 hectares (280 acres)
- Created: 1991
- Operator: Medway Council
- Open: 7 days a week, dawn until dusk
- Website: www.medway.gov.uk/directory_record/760/capstone_farm_country_park_and_play_area

Capstone Farm Country Park is in Chatham, Kent, Medway, in Kent, England. A former farm converted into a landscaped park and open-space area. This park is set on 114 hectares (281.694 acres (1,139,980 m^{2})) of converted farm land, on the North Downs, near Walderslade. It is within the Kent Downs, an Area of Outstanding Natural Beauty.

== History ==
The park is set within Capstone valley, between Hempstead and Walderslade. The valley has been used by human use since the Neolithic period, according to the various archaeological finds in the area.

There were originally four large farms in the Walderslade and surrounding areas, including Walderslade Farm, Settingdon Farm, Shawstead Farm and Gibraltar Farm (the last two farms still exist). Shawstead Farm (and probably others nearby) were associated with the clearance of local woodland, in 1765 to help supply Chatham Dockyard with oak for the building of wooden sailing ships, launched at Chatham. Most of the larger and more valuable oak trees would have existed in the richer soil of the valley bottoms (Walderslade, Shawstead etc.) where the farms were typically located.

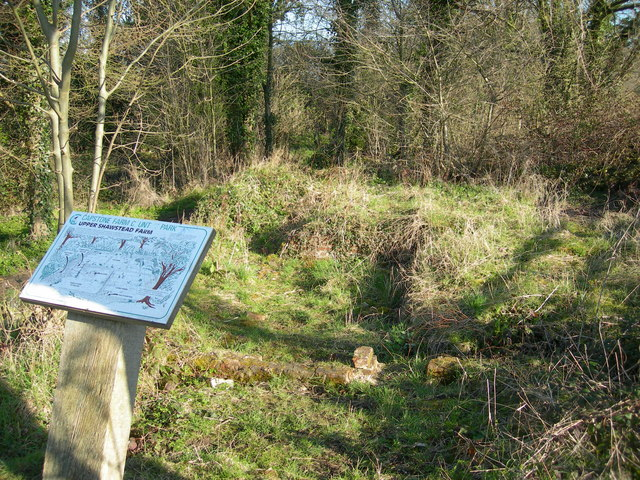
Ruins of Upper Shawstead Farm

Much of the current park boundaries used to belong to the farm of Shawstead Manor. The ruins of Upper Shawstead Farm are still within the boundary of the park. In 1376, Robert Belknapp was forced to give the manor to the Prior and Convent of Rochester to King Edward III, in atonement for certain misdemeanours. The land then remained in the ownership of the church, latterly the Church Commissioners in Canterbury, until 1928. During this time the land was rented out to local farmers, including the Crittendens, but the woodlands were managed by the Church Commissioners.

In the 16th century, a Beacon was erected on the site for military warning and use for cavalry manoeuvres.

In 1928, Chatham Council bought the land but it continued to be leased to a local farmer until 1984 when it was opened as a Country Park for Medway Council. Part of the site continues to be farmed by the Wills family (local farmers) who took on the agricultural tenancy in 1951.

In 1985, the council stopped using the Shawstead landfill site (which has been in use since 1937), this has made more land for the country park, to the west of the park, mainly newly planted woodlands.

In 1984, a section of land (covering an area of 7.8 hectares (19.27 acres (78,000 m^{2})) was sold to create the riding school. Matthews Riding School occupies several paddocks and equine livery buildings.

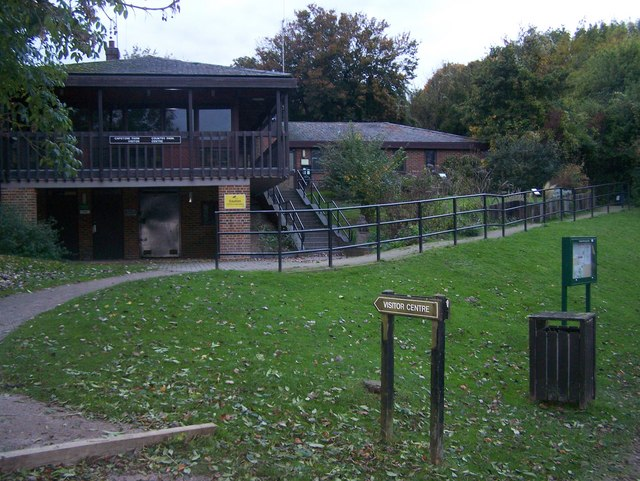
The Visitor Centre

== Facilities ==
It is owned and maintained by Medway Council.

Visitors to the park, near Gillingham, can experience ancient woodlands, including:

- Drow Hill Wood – which is the largest woodland block at 1.4 hectares (3.459 acres (14,000 m^{2})) of mainly sweet chestnut coppice;
- Maze Wood (also known as Capstone Wood) covers 1.9 hectares(4.695 acres (19,000 m^{2})) of sweet chestnut coppice;
- Round Glade Wood – which covers an area of 1.2 hectares (2.965 acres (12,000 m^{2})) of chestnuts and oak;
- Orchid Wood – an area of 1.5 hectares (3.7 acres (15,000 m^{2}))of ancient oak and ash (Fraxinus) woodland;
- Millenium Wood – which covers an area of 0.6 hectares(1.483 acres (6,000 m^{2})). This woodland block was planted in two phases in 1997 and 2000 and contains mixed native species including ash (Fraxinus) silver birch, blackthorn, spindle and beech;
- Tangle Wood 0.5 hectares(1.235 acres (5,000 m^{2})) of hazel woodland;
- Boundary Wood a narrow woodland belt of 0.5 hectares(1.235 acres (5,000 m^{2})) dominated by ash (Fraxinus) coppices on the park's southern boundary.

The woodlands are managed in the traditional way, by coppicing by the park rangers. The park also has large green meadows (including the Events Field) and the 4 acres (16,000 m^{2}) freshwater lake.

At Capstone, a number of rarely sighted species of wildlife can be seen around the site, including great spotted woodpeckers, blackcaps, and willow warblers, within the woods. Yellowhammers in the hedges and in the meadows, skylarks. Many butterfly species can also be found in the park, including speckled wood, gatekeeper and brimstone, seen around the orchard and meadows. Over the lake, many species of dragonflies and damselflies can be seen.

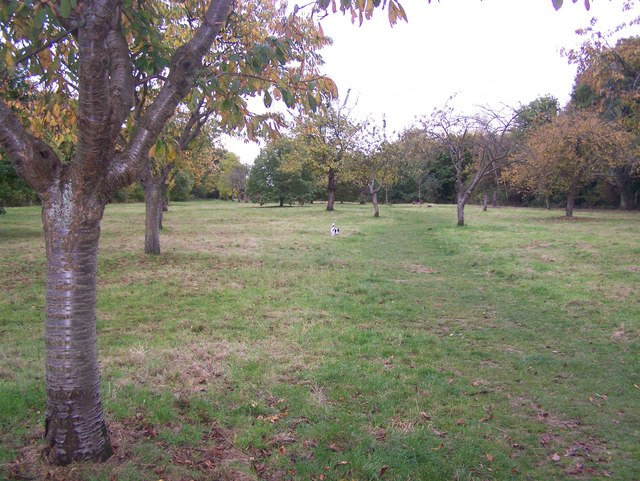
The Orchard

Other facilities at Capstone include a children's play area, public and disabled toilets, refreshments (from a cafe overlooking the lake), picnic area, cycling paths, a visitor centre, fishing (a day ticket is required), an education room, a horse riding trail and a reptile garden (mainly a rock and scrub area).

The Events Field is used for various outdoor acitivies including kite flying "Kites over Capstone", Cancer Research Race for Life. The field is also a very popular place to walk dogs, and it even boasts a doggy trimtrail/ circuit next to it. In addition to this, the events field has public toilets.

The park has a very active volunteer group, who coppice within the woods, maintain the trails and complete many other essential works along with the park rangers.

The park also is accredited with a Green Flag Award by Natural England.
