= ME postcode area =

Postcode area within the United Kingdom

Rochester
- Postcode area
- Location within the United Kingdom
- Coordinates: 51.333°N 0.588°E
- Sovereign state: United Kingdom
- Postcode area: ME
- Postcode area name: Rochester
- Post towns: 11
- Postcode districts: 21
- Postcode sectors: 83
- Postcodes (live): 16,365
- Postcodes (total): 22,129
- Statistics as at May 2020

The ME postcode area, also known as the Rochester postcode area, is a group of 20 postcode districts in South East England, within 11 post towns. These cover north central Kent, including the Medway unitary authority and the borough of Swale, plus parts of the boroughs of Maidstone, Tonbridge and Malling, and Gravesham. The letters in the postcode are derived from the name of the Medway conurbation.

== Coverage ==
The approximate coverage of the postcode districts:

Postcode district	Post town	Coverage	Local authority area(s)
ME1	ROCHESTER	Rochester, Borstal, Burham, Wouldham	Medway, Tonbridge and Malling
ME2	ROCHESTER	Strood, Halling, Cuxton, Frindsbury	Medway
ME3	ROCHESTER	Hoo Peninsula, Higham	Medway, Gravesham
ME4	CHATHAM	Chatham, Brompton, Luton, St. Mary's Island	Medway
ME5	CHATHAM	Walderslade, Blue Bell Hill, Lordswood, Luton	Medway, Tonbridge and Malling & Maidstone
ME6	SNODLAND	Snodland	Tonbridge and Malling
ME7	GILLINGHAM	Gillingham, Brompton, Hempstead, Bredhurst	Medway, Maidstone
ME8	GILLINGHAM	Rainham, Parkwood, Twydall, Hempstead, Wigmore	Medway
ME9	SITTINGBOURNE	Newington, Teynham, Iwade and Rural	Swale
ME10	SITTINGBOURNE	Sittingbourne, Kemsley, Milton Regis	Swale
ME11	QUEENBOROUGH	Queenborough, Rushenden	Swale
ME12	SHEERNESS	Isle of Sheppey, Minster, Sheerness, Eastchurch	Swale
ME13	FAVERSHAM	Faversham, Boughton under Blean, Selling and rural area	Swale
ME14	MAIDSTONE	Maidstone (north and east), Bearsted, Grove Green	Maidstone
ME15	MAIDSTONE	Maidstone (south), Bearsted (Madginford), Downswood, Shepway, Senacre, Loose, Mangravet, Park Wood, Tovil, East Farleigh, West Farleigh	Maidstone
ME16	MAIDSTONE	Maidstone (west of the River Medway), Barming, Allington	Maidstone
ME17	MAIDSTONE	Hollingbourne, Hucking, Harrietsham, Lenham, Boughton Monchelsea, Linton, Coxheath, Chart Sutton, East Sutton, Langley, Kingswood, Sutton Valence	Maidstone
ME18	MAIDSTONE	Wateringbury, Mereworth, Teston, Nettlestead, West Peckham, Yalding, Laddingford	Maidstone, Tonbridge and Malling
ME19	WEST MALLING	West Malling, Kings Hill, Leybourne, East Malling	Tonbridge and Malling
ME20	AYLESFORD	Aylesford, Ditton, Larkfield, Eccles	Tonbridge and Malling
ME99	ROCHESTER	Jobcentre Plus	non-geographic

== Map ==
ME postcode area map, showing postcode districts in red and post towns in grey text, with links to nearby CT, DA, RM, SS and TN postcode areas.

== See also ==
- Postcode Address File
- List of postcode areas in the United Kingdom
