= Greenacre Academy =

Location
- 157 Walderslade Road; Walderslade, Kent, ME5 0LP; England
- Coordinates: 51.3507°N 0.5256°E

Information
- Type: Secondary Modern (non-selective) Academy
- Trust: Skills for life trust UID: 3243
- Department for Education URN: 138046 Tables
- Ofsted: Reports
- Head teacher: Mrs Louise Campbell
- Gender: Boys
- Age: 11 to 18
- Enrolment: 913 as of December 2015
- Website: www.sflt.org.uk/greenacre/

Greenacre Academy (formerly Greenacre School and before that Walderslade Boys School), is a boys' secondary school with a shared sixth form located in Walderslade in the English county of Kent.

== History ==
The school was designed by Richard Sheppard, Robson & Partners, and opened in the late 1950s. Medway, as a former part of Kent retains selection, so Walderslade Boys School opened as a Secondary Modern. It had the status of an 11-18 community school school converted to academy status on 1 April 2012 and was renamed Greenacre Academy.

== Governance ==
It was previously a community school administered by Medway Council; the school converted to academy status on 1 April 2012 and was renamed Greenacre Academy. The school continues to coordinate with Medway Council for admissions.

It is part of the Skills for life trust, which contains: Greenacre Academy, Walderslade Girls School, Warren Wood Primary Academy, Chantry Community Academy, Hilltop Primary Academy, Kloisters Kindergarten and Pre-School, PGW Sixth Form and Greenacre Sports Partnership.

== Academics ==
Ofsted rated this as a Good School in 2014 and 2018, but lowered it to an inadequate in 2023. The school is strong in establishing good behaviour as one of its 'Skills for Life'. Pupils enter the school with lower than average literacy skills which are targeted.

The school offers a three-year Key Stage 3 where the core subjects of the National Curriculum are taught.

At Key Stage 4, the academy offers GCSEs, BTECs, OCR Nationals and NVQs as programmes of study for pupils. The subjects are English (Literature and Language), Maths, Science and Skills for Life. Students may study the English Baccalaureate as they are offered options of: Modern Foreign Languages, Computing and Humanities (History and Geography). Further choices are available to selected student. Ofsted considers the rate of progress for students at the lower end is good, but the higher ability pupils underperform.

The school also operates a sixth form provision in partnership with Walderslade Girls' School, with students having the option to study from a range of A Levels and further BTECs.
