= Walderslade Girls' School =

Location
- Bradfields Avenue; Walderslade, Kent, ME5 0LE; England
- Coordinates: 51.3529°N 0.5251°E

Information
- Type: Secondary comprehensive (non-selective) Academy
- Trust: Skills for life trust UID: 3243
- Department for Education URN: 137630 Tables
- Ofsted: Reports
- Head teacher: Louise Campbell
- Gender: Girls
- Age: 11 to 18
- Enrolment: 909 as of January 2015
- Website: sflt.org.uk/waldersladegirls

Walderslade Girls' School is a secondary school and sixth form for girls located in Walderslade in the English county of Kent.

== Governance ==
The school was designed by Richard Sheppard, Robson & Partners and opened in the late 1950s. It was a community school administered by Medway Council, however the school was converted to academy status on 1 April 2012. Walderslade Girls' School continues to coordinate with Medway Council for admissions.

From the summer of 2018 Walderslade Girls school joined the Skills for life trust (Greenacre Academic trust). Schools within the academy consist of: Greenacre Academy, Walderslade Girls School, Warren Wood Primary Academy, Chantry Community Academy (primary), Hilltop Primary Academy, Kloisters Kindergarten and Pre-School, PGW Sixth Form and Greenacre Sports Partnership.

== Academics ==
The school sees itself as a traditional girls school with a sense of togetherness pervading the school. Diversity, aspiration, honesty and personal integrity are encouraged leading to motivation, self-discipline, self-resilience and individual responsibility. Students are expected to show kindness to others.

Though pastorally the school divides into Lower School (Year 7-Year 8), Middle School (Year 9 Year 10) and Upper School (Year 11 & Sixth Form) it runs a three-year Key Stage 3, and a two-year Key Stage 4, and shared sixth-form provision.

=== Key Stage 3 ===
Based on the Key Stage 2 SATs, incoming students are divided in to mixed-ability or Alpha sets.

=== Key Stage 4 ===
Walderslade Girls' School offers GCSEs and BTECs as programmes of study for pupils. All pupils study English, English Literature, Maths, and Science. As a first option: they select either History, Geography or a language. As a second option: from a Creative Art, a Performing Arts, or an additional humanities, sports or Food, and Ethics.

=== Shared Sixth form ===
The school also operates a sixth form provision in partnership with Greenacre Academy, with students having the option to study from a range of A Levels and further BTECs.
