= Hempstead, Kent =

Village in Kent, England

Coordinates: 51.350°N 0.571°E

Hempstead
- Village
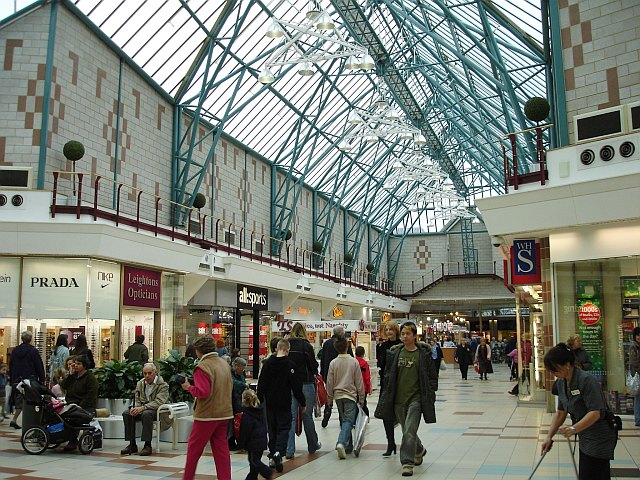
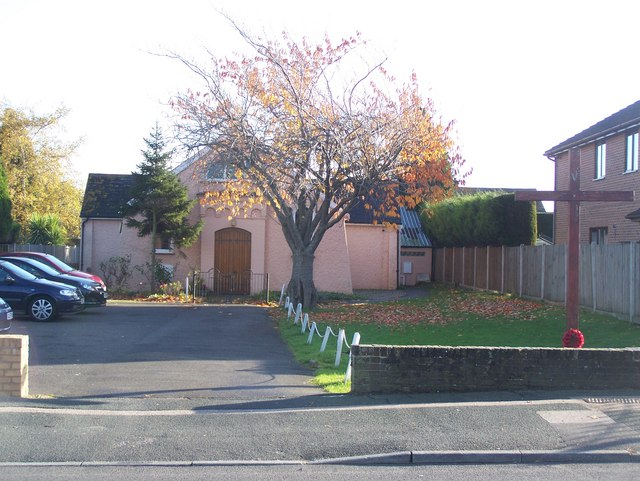
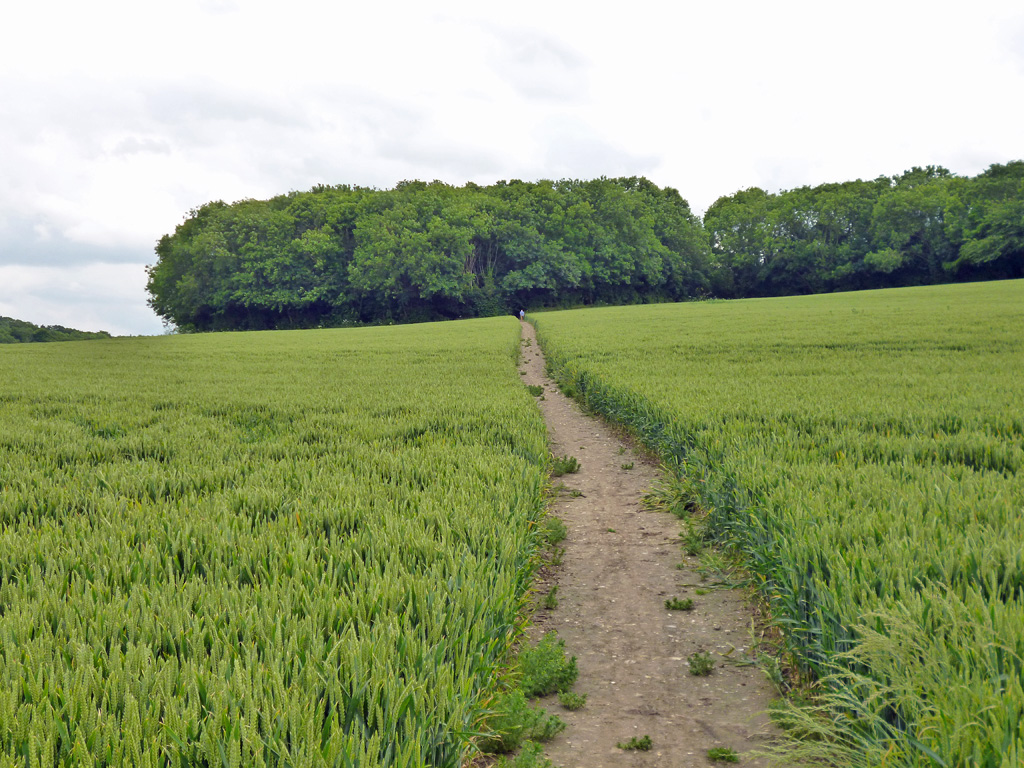
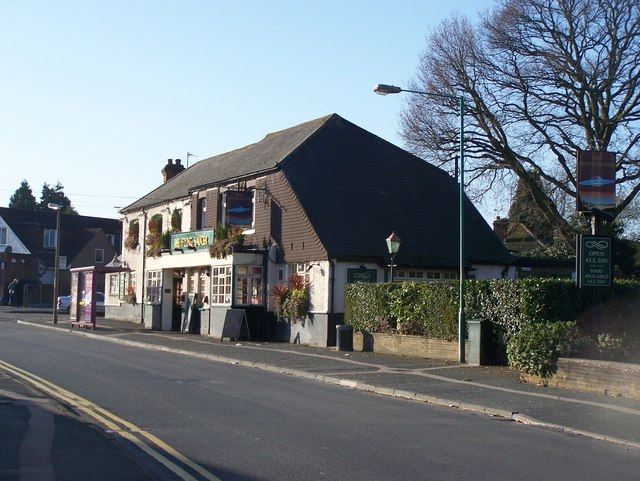
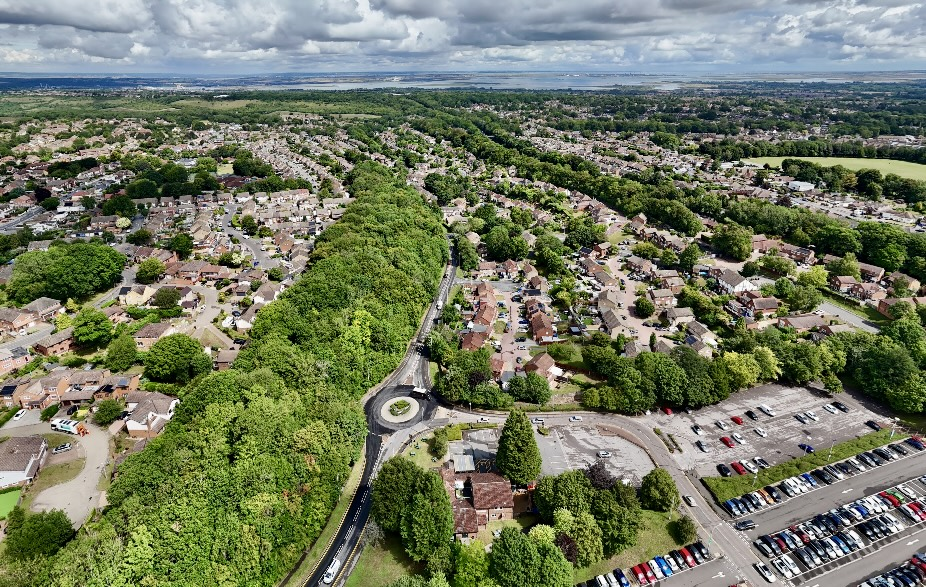
- Hempstead Valley Shopping Centre All Saints Church Spekes Bottom The Flying Saucer Public House Aerial view of the surrounding area and skyline in Hempstead

- Location within Kent
- Population: 5,000
- OS grid reference: TQ775675
- Unitary authority: Medway
- Ceremonial county: Kent
- Region: South East
- Country: England
- Sovereign state: United Kingdom
- Post town: GILLINGHAM
- Postcode district: ME7
- Dialling code: 01634
- Police: Kent
- Fire: Kent
- Ambulance: South East Coast
- UK Parliament: Gillingham and Rainham

Hempstead is a village near Gillingham, Kent in South East England. Historically a small hamlet, Hempstead grew throughout the 20th century to become part of the urban area of the Medway Towns. Hempstead is located on the southern edge of the Unitary authority of Medway, surrounded by Wigmore and the A278 trunk road (Hoath Way) to the east, Capstone valley to the west and the M2 motorway and the village of Bredhurst to the south. Most of Hempstead is in a valley, with Hempstead Valley Drive running along its length with housing on both sides.

== History ==
The settlement of Hempstead dates back to at least the mid-1600s. Within the records of the Hundred of Chatham & Gillingham, a hamlet then known as "Hemsted" denoted a few houses along the still-extant Hempstead Road. The hamlet's earliest 16th century farmhouse still stands and is Grade II listed by Historic England; lands owned by this farm bequeathed to regional administration became Hempstead Playing Fields. The playing field is currently home to Hempstead Valley Football Club and previously fielded a successful cricket team, since disbanded.

During the Battle of Britain in October 1940, a Royal Air Force Hawker Hurricane flown by Flight Lieutenant Ian James Muirhead DFC crashed at Spekes Bottom, near Hempstead. A memorial to Fl. Lt. Muirhead marks the site of the crash.

By the early 1980s, significant areas of legacy woodland and orchard ranging from Gillingham Link Road (A289) to the Hempstead Valley Shopping Centre, across to Capstone Road and back to the border of Wigmore Business Park were developed by Wards Construction and Wimpey Homes. More recent planning applications made to Medway Council for the development of areas west of Hempstead, around Capstone and towards Princes Park, have at present been staved off.

== All Saints Church ==
All Saints Church was built in 1911 as a mission chapel and was originally part of the Parish of Luton. Today, the church is one of the four churches which comprise the Parish of South Gillingham in the Diocese of Rochester together with St Matthew's Wigmore, St Paul's Parkwood and St Peter's Bredhurst.

== Hempstead School ==
Hempstead School was founded in 1907 in the building that is now Hempstead Library. In the 1980s, the school split to form an Infant school and a Junior school. There are approximately 90 children in each year group (3 classes of thirty per year group). There are 3 years in the Infant school (Year R, Year 1 and Year 2) and four years in the Junior school (Year 3, Year 4, Year 5 and Year 6). The schools occupy two sides of the same site, with playing fields in between. The school often competes in the 'Medway Mini Youth Games' in sports such as hockey, table tennis, cricket and athletics. They have recently provided the children with new amenities, such as a new climbing wall, a gazebo (officially opened by local comedian Joe Pasquale) and various other playground decorations and playthings.

== Hempstead Valley Shopping Centre ==
The area is host to a large shopping complex called Hempstead Valley Shopping Centre. It was one of the first out-of-town shopping centres in Kent. The centre includes the county's largest branch of Sainsbury's (formerly a Savacentre) and Medway's largest Marks & Spencer. The centre also once housed the world's largest branch of NSS, situated at the main entrance to the centre. This newsagents later became a 'Forbuoys' (now part of the RS McColl group).

Development of the centre commenced in 1974, creating 250,000-square-foot (23,000 m^{2}) of retail space. In the early 1990s an extension was built which is now home to an 80,000 sq ft (7,400 m^{2}) M&S.

The original Picnic Parlour at Hempstead Valley was the UK's second food court (the first opening at Brent Cross Shopping Centre in 1976) and the centre was modelled on successful complexes in North America. It was originally planned to be an open-air shopping centre but the concept was changed to a covered shopping complex. The centre opened on 17 October 1978.

Medway Council granted permission for a further extension in 2011. This extension has converted the empty units outside the main centre into a new food court with more outdoor seating, with the old food court converted into more retail units within the centre.
