= Wigmore, Kent =

Suburb of Medway, Kent, England

Coordinates: 51.356°N 0.595°E

Wigmore
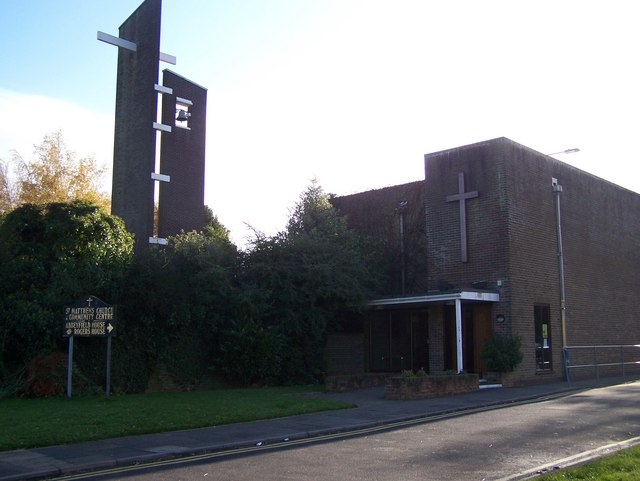
- The post-war St Matthew's Church

- Location within Kent
- Unitary authority: Medway
- Ceremonial county: Kent
- Region: South East
- Country: England
- Sovereign state: United Kingdom
- Post town: Gillingham
- Postcode district: ME8
- Dialling code: 01634
- Police: Kent
- Fire: Kent
- Ambulance: South East Coast
- UK Parliament: Gillingham and Rainham

Wigmore is a suburb in the southeast of Medway in Kent, England. It is bordered by Hempstead to the west, Parkwood to the east, Bredhurst to the southwest, the M2 junction four to the south, and Rainham to the north east.

== History ==
The placename is attested in 1275 as Wydemere, from an Old English *wīd-mere "broad pool".

A sparsely populated hamlet and farming area until the 20th century, Wigmore was briefly the site of a smallpox isolation hospital (Alexandra Hospital) from 1902, and began to be developed as a suburb from 1906 when the 365-acre Wigmore agricultural estate was partitioned and sold as plots, initially as smallholdings (hence the local “Smallholders Club”) and rural shanties for Medway families.

== Amenities ==
St Matthew's Church was founded in 1925 and was replaced in the 1960s by architects Brett, Boyd and Bosanquet. A prefab Evangelical church was opened later.

Now fully suburbanised within the East of the Medway Towns, the area has a community primary school, medical centre. There is also a local football club called Wigmore Youth F.C, which runs teams for both boys and girls which range from under-7s up to under-18s.

== Transport ==
Arriva bus 132 runs between Wigmore, Rainham and Chatham.

== References in popular culture ==
Rock bands associated with the locality-championing Medway scene have referenced Wigmore; The Buff Medways in the song "Medway Wheelers" (2005) and the Len Price 3 with "Wigmore Swingers" (2014).
