= Medway =

Unitary authority area in Kent, England

- Unitary authority area and borough
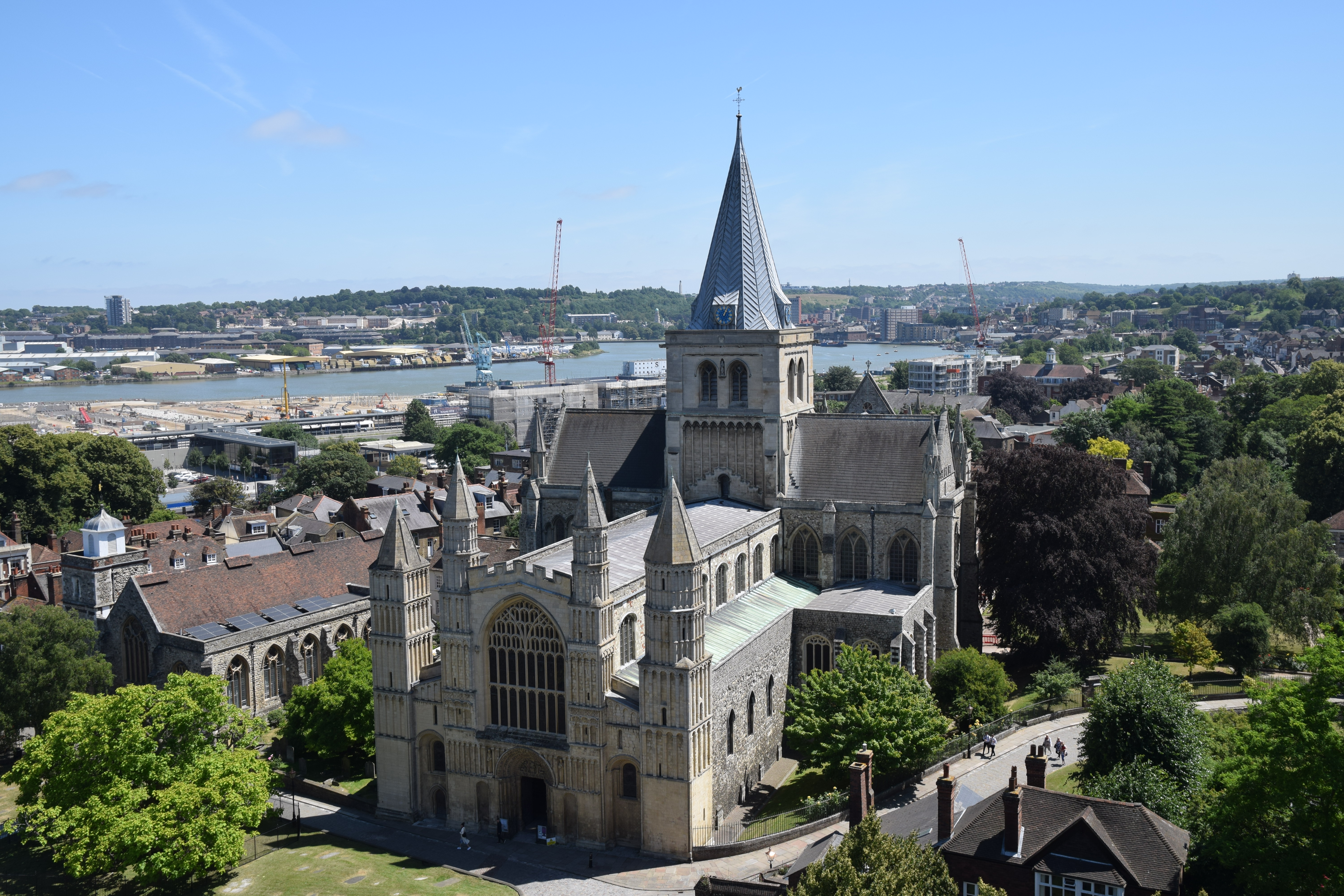
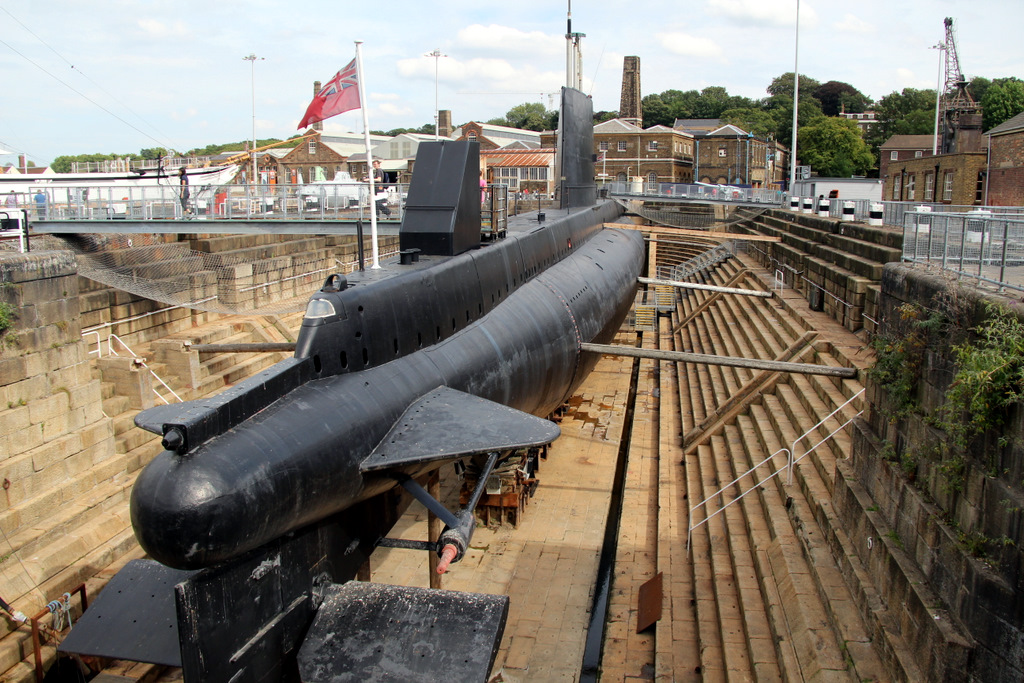
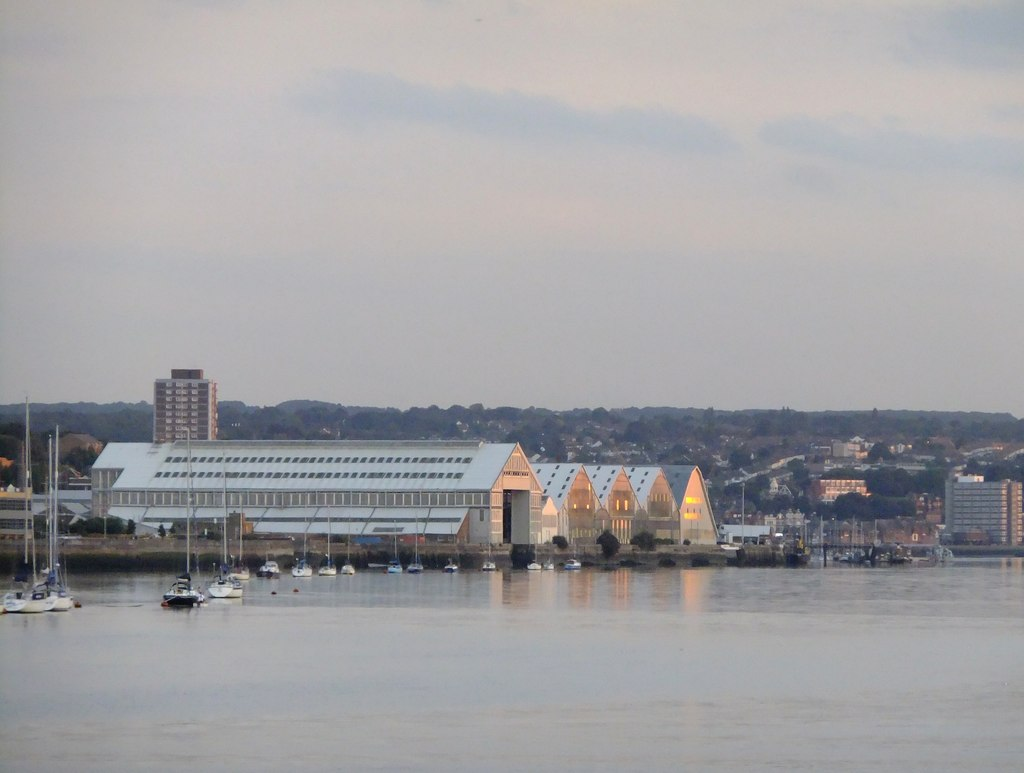
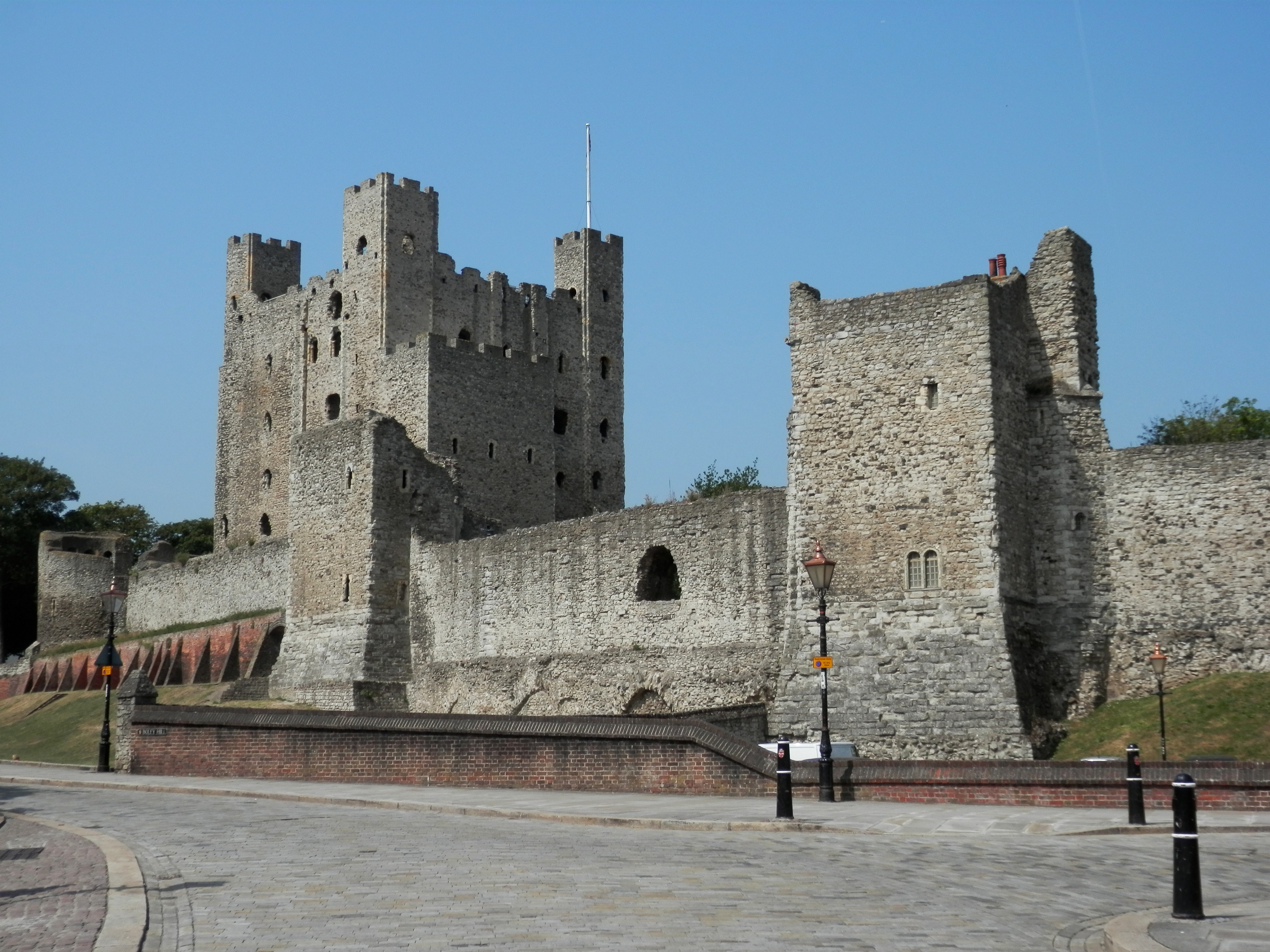
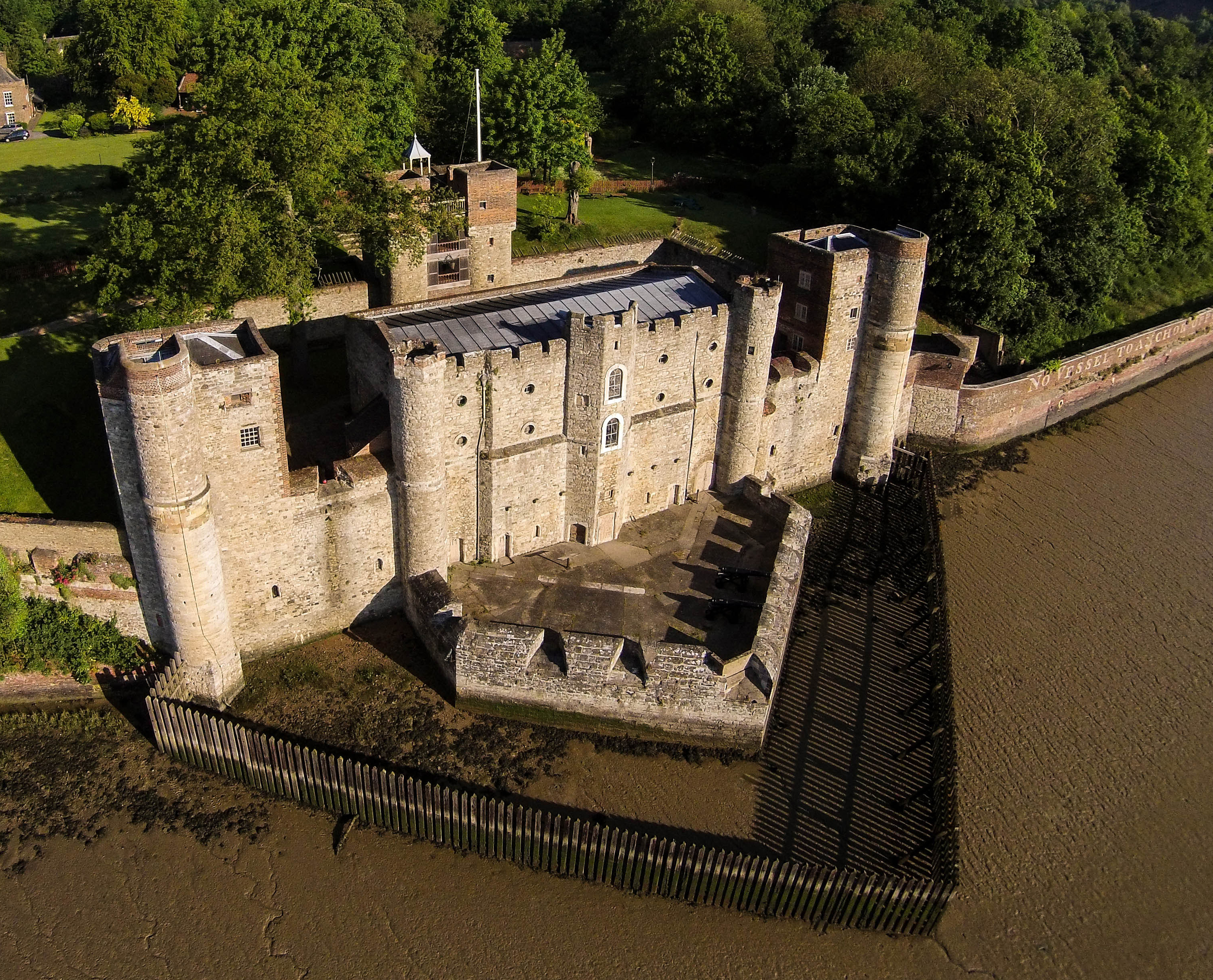
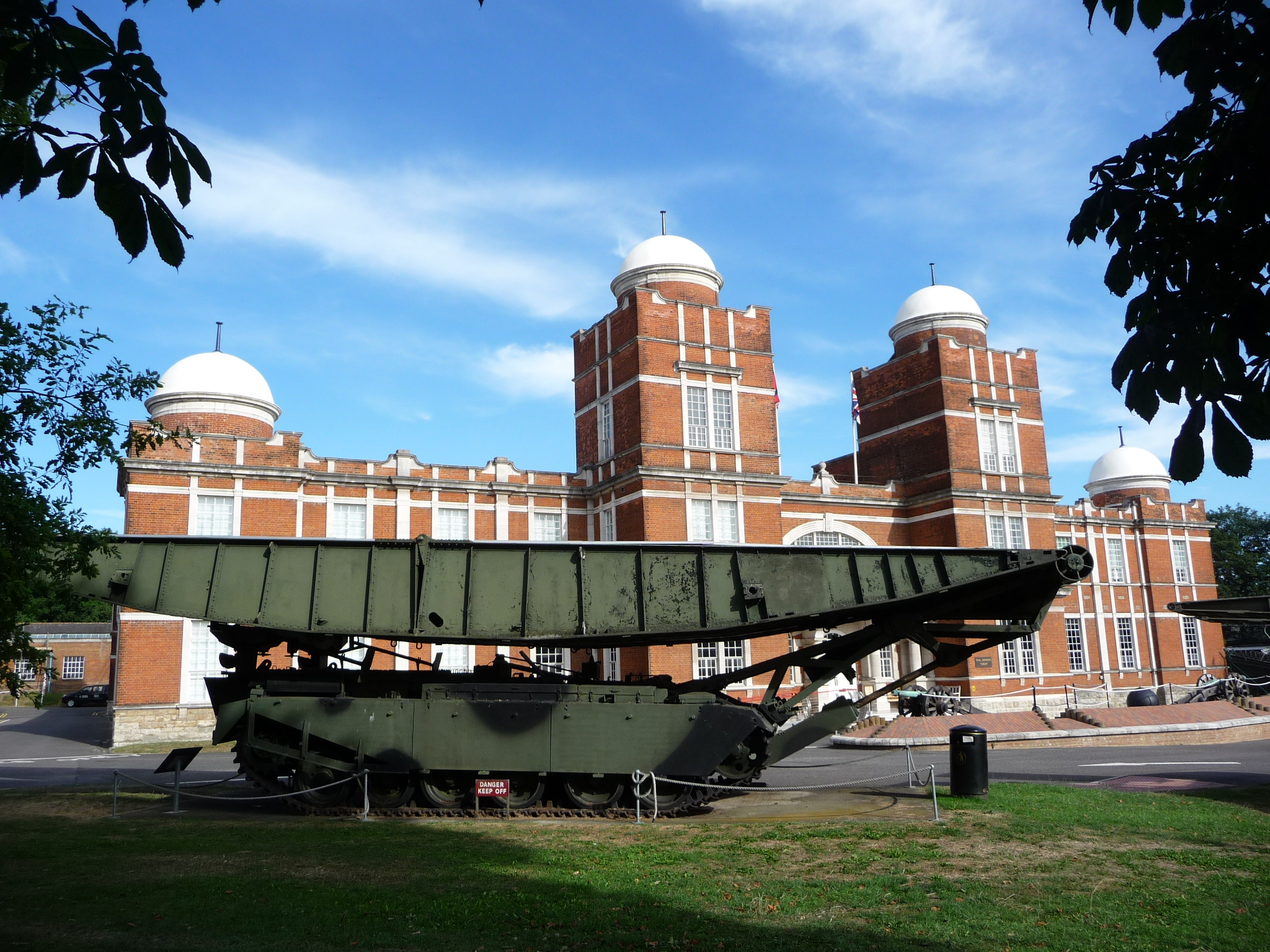
- Clockwise from top: Rochester Cathedral, HMS Ocelot, Rochester Castle, Royal Engineers Museum, Upnor Castle, Chatham Historic Dockyard

- Coat of arms Council logo

- Shown within Kent
- Coordinates: 51°23′N 0°32′E
- Sovereign state: United Kingdom
- Constituent country: England
- Region: South East England
- Ceremonial county: Kent
- Status: Unitary authority
- Incorporated: 1 April 1998
- Admin HQ: Gun Wharf, Chatham

Government
  - Type: Unitary authority
  - Body: Medway Council
  - Leadership: Leader & Cabinet (Labour Co-op)
  - Mayor: Cllr Douglas Hamandishe
  - MPs: Tristan Osborne (L); Naushabah Khan (L); Lauren Edwards (L)
  - Deputy Mayor: Cllr Wayne Spring
  - Council Leader: Cllr Vince Maple

Area
  - Total: 74.14 sq mi (192.03 km^{2})
  - Rank: 148th (of 296)

Population (2025)
  - Total: 292,697
  - Rank: 57th (of 296)
  - Density: 3,947.7/sq mi (1,524.2/km^{2})

Ethnicity (2021)
  - Ethnic groups: List: 84.3% White; 5.9% Asian; 5.6% Black; 2.8% Mixed; 1.4% other

Religion (2021)
  - Religion: List: 45.1% Christianity; 43% no religion; 5.5% not stated; 2.7% Islam; 1.6% Sikhism; 1.1% Hinduism; 0.6% other; 0.4% Buddhism; 0.1% Judaism
- Time zone: UTC0 (GMT)
  - Summer (DST): UTC+1 (BST)
- ONS code: 00LC (ONS) E06000035 (GSS)
- OS grid reference: TQ768688
- ISO 3166-2: GB-MED
- Website: medway.gov.uk

Medway is a unitary authority area with borough status in the ceremonial county of Kent in South East England. It was formed in 1998 by merging the boroughs of Rochester-upon-Medway and Gillingham, and is administered by Medway Council, which is independent from Kent County Council. The borough had a population of 292,655 in 2024. The borough contains the towns of Chatham, Gillingham, Rainham, Rochester and Strood, which are collectively known as the Medway Towns. Medway will be abolished and replaced by the new unitary authority of North Kent on 1 April 2028, with elections to the shadow authority set to happen on 6 May 2027.

Medway is one of the boroughs included in the Thames Gateway development scheme. It is also the home of Universities at Medway, a tri-partite collaboration of the University of Greenwich, the University of Kent and Canterbury Christ Church University on a single campus in Chatham, together with the Medway School of Arts.

== Geography ==
Because of its strategic location by the major crossing of the River Medway, the borough has made a wide and significant contribution to Kent, and to England, dating back thousands of years, as evident in the siting of Watling Street by the Romans and by the Norman Rochester Castle, Rochester Cathedral (the second oldest in Britain) and the Chatham naval dockyard and its associated defences.

The main towns in the conurbation are (from west to east): Strood, Rochester, Chatham, Gillingham, and Rainham. These are traditionally known as the Medway Towns. Many other towns and villages such as Frindsbury and Brompton lie within the conurbation. Outside the urban area, the villages retain parish councils. Cuxton, Halling and Wouldham are in the Medway Gap region to the south of Rochester and Strood. Hoo St Werburgh, Cliffe, High Halstow, St Mary Hoo, Allhallows, Stoke and Grain are on the Hoo Peninsula to the north. Frindsbury Extra including Upnor borders Strood.

The southern part of the urban area is on the north slope of the North Downs, including the suburbs of Walderslade, Luton, Hempstead and Wigmore.

Over half of the unitary authority area is rural in nature. Medway includes parts of the North Kent Marshes, an environmentally significant wetlands region with several Sites of Special Scientific Interest (SSSIs). Other similar areas of conservation include Ranscombe Farm on chalk grassland and woodland between Strood and Cuxton, with rare woodland flowers and orchids.

== History ==
The Medway area has a long and varied history dominated originally by the city of Rochester and later by the naval and military establishments principally in Chatham and Gillingham.

Rochester was established on an Iron Age site by the Romans, who called it Durobrivae (meaning "stronghold by the bridge"), to control the point where Watling Street (now the A2) crossed the River Medway. Rochester later became a walled town and, under later Saxon influence, a mint was established here. The first cathedral was built by Bishop Justus in 604 and rebuilt under the Normans by Bishop Gundulf, who also built the castle that stands opposite the cathedral. Rochester was also an important point for people travelling the Pilgrims' Way, which stretches from Winchester to the shrine of Thomas Becket at Canterbury. The Pilgrims' Way crossed the Medway near Cuxton.

In Rochester, parts of the Roman city wall are still in evidence, and the city has many fine buildings, such as the Guildhall (today a museum), which was built in 1687 and is among the finest 17th-century civic buildings in Kent; the Corn Exchange, built in 1698, originally the Butcher's Market; the small Tudor house of Watts Charity endowed by Sir Richard Watts to house "six poor travelers" for one night each; Satis House and Old Hall, both visited by Queen Elizabeth I, built in 1573. In Medway there are 82 scheduled monuments, 832 Listed buildings and 22 conservation areas.

=== Naval and military history ===
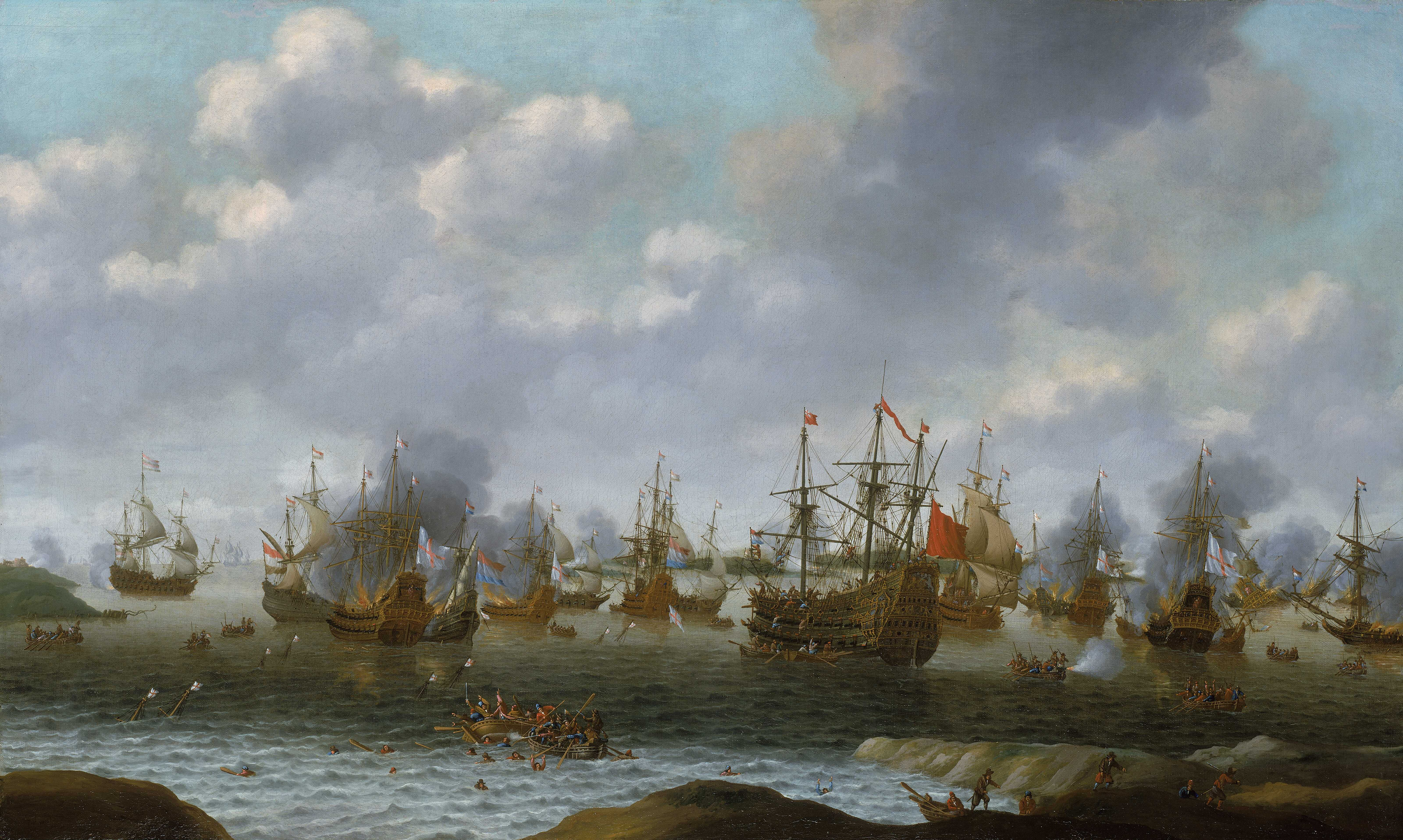
Dutch Attack on the Medway, June 1667 by Pieter Cornelisz van Soest, painted c. 1667. The captured ship HMS Royal Charles is right of centre

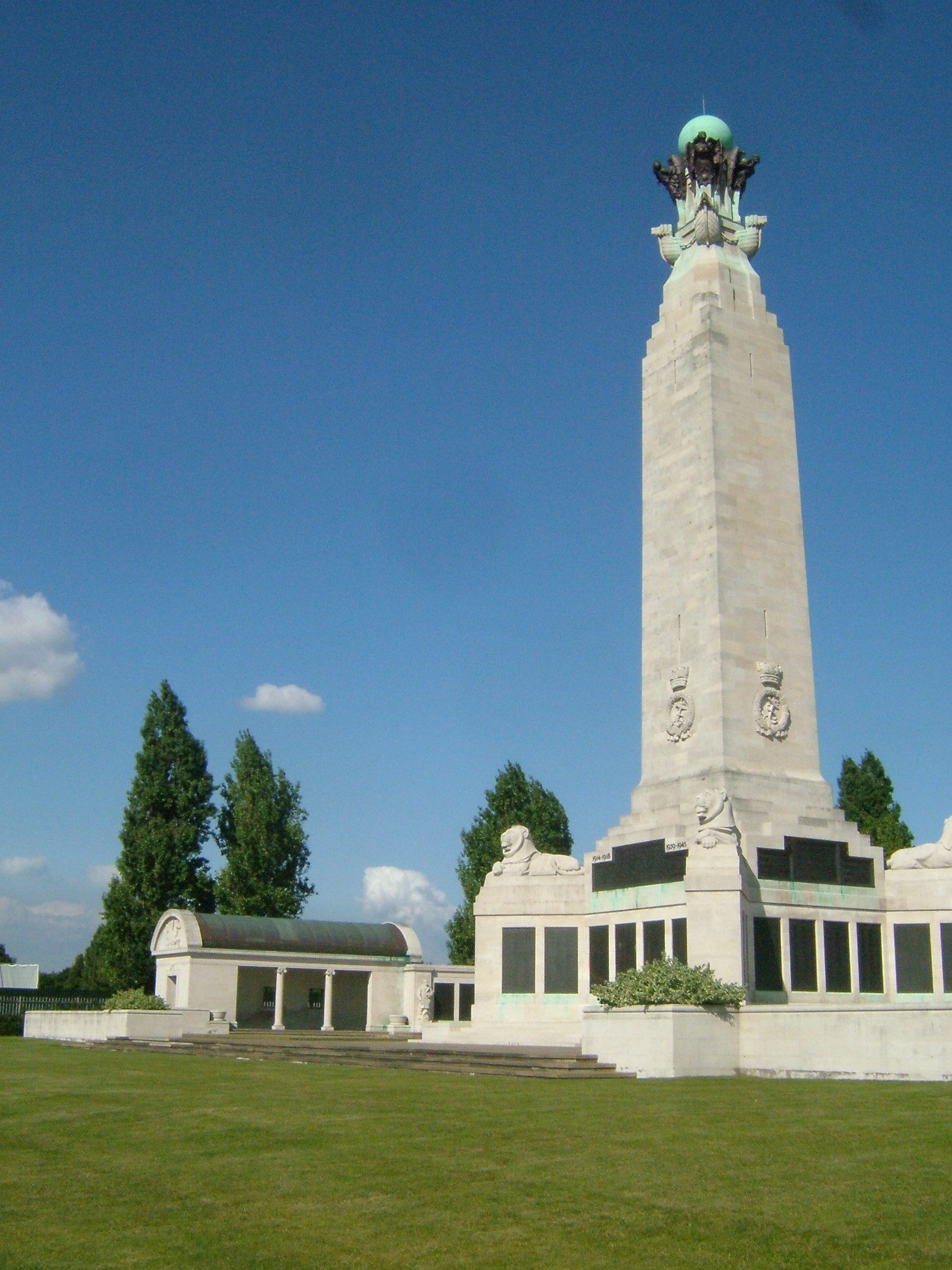
The Chatham Naval Memorial commemorates the 18,500 officers, ranks and ratings of the Royal Navy who were lost or buried at sea in the two World Wars. It stands on the Great Lines between Chatham and Gillingham.

The Royal Navy opened an anchorage dockyard in Gillingham (Jillingham Water) during the reign of Henry VIII, in 1567 the Royal Naval Dockyard was established in Medway. Although it is called Chatham dockyard, two-thirds of the dockyard lie within Gillingham. The dockyard was closed in 1984, with the loss of eight thousand jobs at the dockyard itself and many more in local supply industries, contributing to a mid-1980s Medway unemployment rate of sixteen per cent. It was protected by a series of forts including Fort Amherst and the Lines, Fort Pitt and Fort Borstal. The majority of surviving buildings in the Historic Dockyard are Georgian. It was here that HMS Victory, Admiral Lord Nelson's flagship at Trafalgar, was built and launched in 1765. Sir Francis Drake learned his seamanship on the Medway; Sir John Hawkins founded a hospital in Chatham for seamen, and Nelson began his Navy service at Chatham at the age of 12. Other notable sea-faring and naval figures, such as William Adams, were raised on the Medway but apprenticed elsewhere. The river was further protected by such fortifications as Upnor Castle. In 1667, according to varying accounts it was partly successful in thwarting the Dutch raid on the dockyard, or the commanding officer fled without firing on the Dutch.

Another warship built at Chatham that still exists is HMS Unicorn (a 46-gun "Leda" class frigate) laid down in February 1822, and launched 30 March 1824. She never saw active service and has been restored and is (as of 2005) preserved afloat in Dundee, Scotland.

On 25 November 1914 the battleship HMS Bulwark was moored at buoy number 17 at Kethole Reach on the River Medway. She was taking on coal from the airship base at Kingsnorth, on the Isle of Grain when an internal explosion (most likely the result of cordite charges stored alongside a boiler room bulkhead and failure to follow guidelines on the storage of shells) ripped the ship apart. In all, the explosion killed 745 men and 51 officers. Five of the 14 men who survived died later of their wounds, and almost all of the others were seriously wounded. There are mass and individual graves in Woodlands Cemetery in Gillingham for the Bulwark's dead, who were mostly drawn from the Portsmouth area. The explosion could be heard from up to 20 mi (30 km) at Southend and Whitstable. In terms of loss of life it remains the second worst explosion in British history.

Less than six months later there was a second explosion. This time it was the Princess Irene. She was a 1,500-passenger liner built at Dumbarton in 1914 for Canadian Pacific. Before she could leave Britain she was commandeered for war service and became HMS Princess Irene, and was used as a minelayer. After several trips she was back in the Medway for a refit when on the morning of 27 May 1915 a huge internal explosion tore through the vessel, shaking the ground for miles around and showering the surrounding villages with remains of bodies and debris. A total of 278 died, including 78 workers from nearby towns and villages. In one Sheerness street there were ten who died. A Court of Inquiry was held into the loss and evidence was given that priming of the mines was being carried out hurriedly and by untrained personnel. A faulty primer was blamed for the explosion.

The British Army also established barracks here; and the Royal Engineers headquarters is in Gillingham.

The Royal Marines also have a long association with Chatham. The Chatham Division was based in Chatham until the closure of Chatham Dockyard. A museum dedicated to the Royal Marines can be found close to the dockyard at the Royal Engineers Museum in Brompton. Founded in 1812, it moved to its current site in 1987. It was classed as Grade II listed on 5 December 1996.

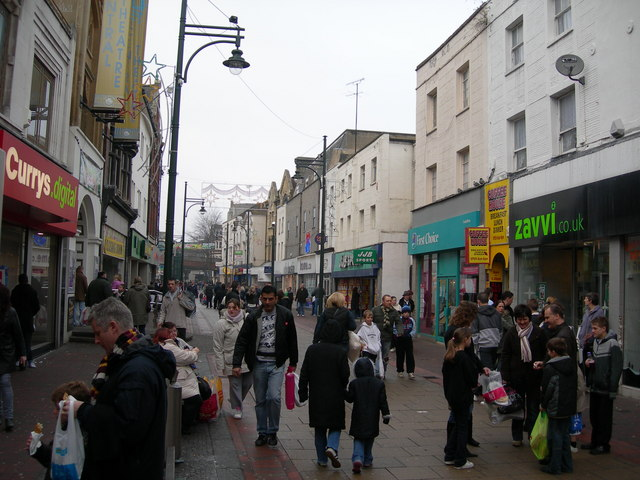
Chatham High Street, December 2007

=== Post-war development ===
After World War II, the Medway conurbation expanded to the south as areas including Walderslade, Lordswood, Hempstead and Wigmore were developed, aided by the construction of the M2 motorway in the 1960s.

The population of Medway is projected to increase to around 300,000 by 2028 according to 2013 projections. Medway Council foresees total investment on development to be in excess of £1 billion over a 20-year period from 2006.

As of 2019, the towns in order of population (approximate figures) were Gillingham (85,000 – not including Rainham), Chatham (78,000), Strood (40,000), Rochester (30,000 – not including Strood) and Rainham (25,000). The towns as a whole are expected to rise dramatically in residents as increased development and housing prices are considerably less than most of Kent and London, which is 30 miles away.

In 2004, Medway Council announced its development strategy for the Medway Waterfront area. The report set out a 20-year framework plan for the redevelopment of up to seven miles (11 km) of waterfront and surrounding areas along the River Medway. The project aims to create between 6,000 and 8,000 new homes and 8,500 jobs, against central government targets of 16,000 new homes and 23,000 new jobs for the Medway area as a whole.

Among the transport proposals set forth for consideration were a new bridge linking the Medway City industrial estate to central Chatham; the removal of Chatham's gyratory system along with an associated relocation of the town's bus station; remodelling of Strood's one-way system; and the provision of new cycle lanes and park-and-ride services throughout the area.

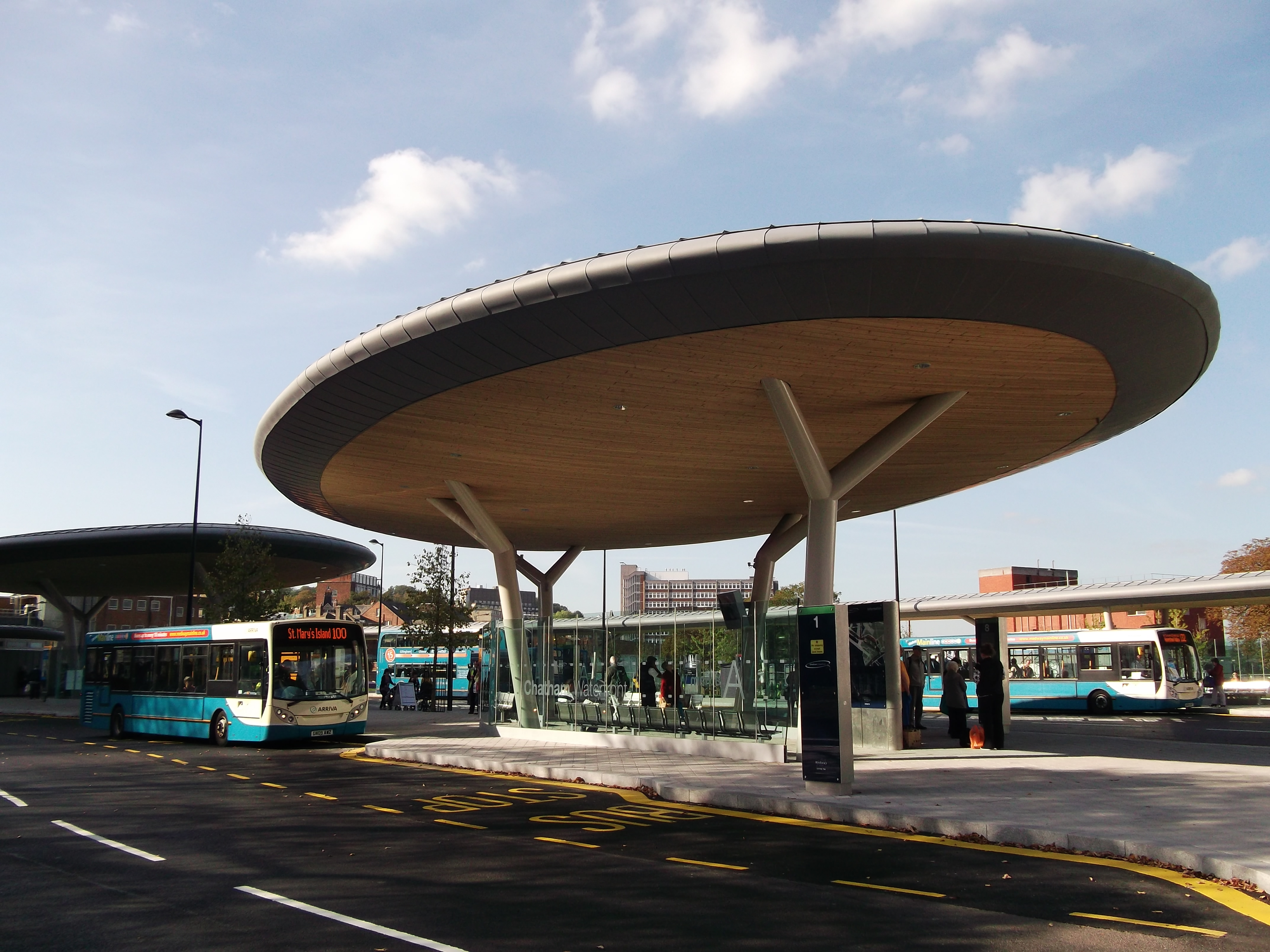
Chatham Bus Interchange Station, October 2011

Chatham's ring road system was subsequently changed into a two-way system in September 2006 with the Sir John Hawkins flyover (pictured right in 2007) being closed before later demolition to make way for a new bus station at the end of 2008. The new bus station opened in October 2011.

=== Other recent and proposed developments ===
==== Rochester Riverside ====
The Rochester Riverside development is a large-scale project located on a 74-acre (30-hectare) brownfield site between the River Medway and the railway line, involving the construction of high-density residential and commercial spaces, with plans to build up to 50 homes per hectare. Key elements include the Rochester Riverside Church of England Primary School, a Multi-Storey Car Park on Cory's Road, and various commercial facilities such as hotels, a business centre, a health centre, cafés, restaurants, bars, and retail units. Additionally, Eventide Park, a new public space within the school area, has been created for community recreation. This redevelopment is part of a broader effort to revitalize the Rochester waterfront, improve transport links, and establish a mixed-use urban environment with connections to London and surrounding areas.

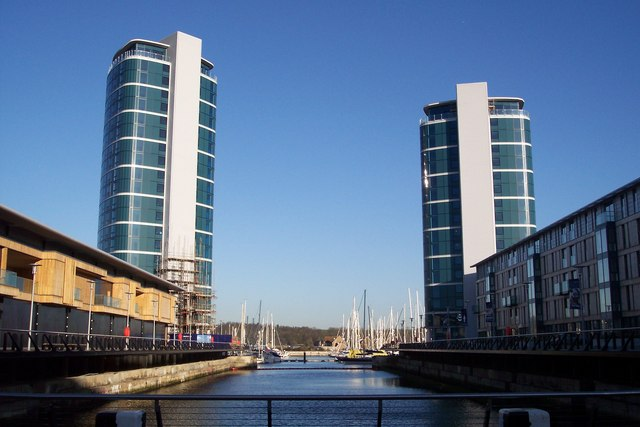
The Quays, Chatham Dockside, December 2009

==== Chatham centre and waterfront ====
Numerous developments are proposed for the Chatham area including widening and straightening Union Street, development and improvements to The Brook and new developments at Gun Wharf and Chatham Waterfront. Another development at Chatham Maritime (near the marina area south of St Mary's island) is The Quays, a mixed-use development comprising two 20-storey residential towers, designed by WilkinsonEyre architects.

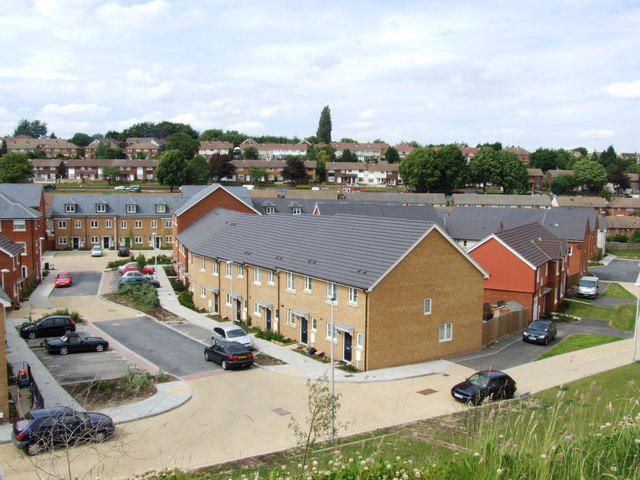
A view of the Medway Gate development, June 2009.

==== Medway Gate ====
A major development in Strood between Medway Valley Park and junction 2 of the M2 motorway, much of the Medway Gate development is inside a large abandoned chalk pit. The area has seen the building of over 400 homes since work began in 2006, including 125 affordable homes.

==== Strood riverside ====
Redevelopment including new homes and a landscaped play area were completed in the 1990s, but there are plans to extend this development further along the river beyond Strood railway station with another 500 to 600 homes to be built, the waterfront developed with new recreational and leisure facilities, and access to the station, town centre and Medway City estate to be improved.

==== Temple Waterfront ====
This 173-acre (70-hectare) area between the river and Morgan's Timber yard in Strood (formerly a Templar farm) has plans for 600 homes to be built along with 15,000 square metres (160,000 square feet) of commercial space and a new two-hectare (4.9-acre) site for Morgan's Timber.

=== Planned dissolution ===
As part of the ongoing changes to local government in England, the two-tiered Kent council structure and Medway were set to be abolished and replaced with single-tier unitary authorities. While Medway was already a unitary authority, its population of under 300,000 people did not meet the UK Government population guidelines of roughly 500,000 for new unitary authorities. Following a lengthy consultation in which councils, Medway included, submitted proposals for new unitary authorities, option 4B was chosen by Secretary of State for Housing, Communities and Local Government Steve Reed, which will create 4 new unitary authorities in Kent and Medway, and merging Medway with Gravesham and Dartford to create North Kent, with elections to the shadown authority on 6 May 2027 and the full transition coming into effect on 1 April 2028. Medway Council, despite being allocated £900k in government funding to cover administration costs for the transition, sold off assets worth £7m to fund staffing costs in the transition.

== Governance ==
Throughout the 19th century, there had been proposals to join the Medway towns under a single authority. By 1903 moves began to take place: that year saw the creation of the Borough of Gillingham, to which, in 1928, the adjoining parish of Rainham was added.

In 1944, a Medway Towns Joint Amalgamation Committee was formed by the borough corporations of Chatham, Gillingham and Rochester, to discuss the possibility of the towns forming a single county borough. In 1948 the Local Government Boundary Commission recommended that the area become a "most purposes" county borough, but the recommendation was not carried out. In 1956 the Joint Amalgamation Committee decided in favour of the amalgamation and invited representatives from Strood Rural District Council to join the committee. In 1960, a proposal was made by Rochester Council that the merger be effected by the city absorbing the two other towns, to safeguard its ancient charters and city status. This led to Gillingham Council voting to leave the committee, as it believed the three towns should go forward as equal partners. On 9 March, the committee held its last meeting, with the Chatham representatives voting to dissolve the body and those from Rochester voting against. The motion to disband was passed on the casting vote of the chairman, Alderman Semple from Chatham.

Under the Local Government Act 1972, on 1 April 1974 the City of Rochester, the Borough of Chatham and part of Strood Rural District were amalgamated to form the Borough of Medway, a local government district in the county of Kent. Gillingham remained separate. Under letters patent the former city council area was to continue to be styled the "City of Rochester" to "perpetuate the ancient name" and to recall "the long history and proud heritage of the said city". The city was unique, as it had no council or charter trustees and no mayor or civic head. In 1979, the Borough of Medway was renamed as Rochester-upon-Medway, and in 1982 further letters patent transferred the city status to the entire borough.

=== Creation of modern borough ===
The modern borough was created on 1 April 1998 as part of the 1990s local government reforms. The way the change was implemented was to create a new non-metropolitan district and a non-metropolitan county, both of which were called 'Medway Towns', each covering the combined area of the previous local government districts of Rochester-upon-Medway and Gillingham. There is no separate county council; instead the district council also performs county council functions, making it a unitary authority. The district remains part of the ceremonial county of Kent for the purposes of lieutenancy and shrievalty.

The district was awarded borough status from its creation, allowing the chair of the council to take the title of mayor. The first elections to the new council were in 1997; it initially acted as a shadow authority to oversee the transition to the new system, before formally coming into office on 1 April 1998. With effect from that day, the incoming council changed the borough and non-metropolitan county's name from Medway Towns to just Medway.

Since it was the local government district of Rochester-upon-Medway that officially held city status under the 1982 letters patent, when it was abolished, it also ceased to be a city. The other local government districts with city status that were abolished around this time (Bath and Hereford) appointed charter trustees to maintain the existence of the city and the mayoralty. However, Rochester-upon-Medway City Council had decided not to and as a result their city status was rescinded. Medway Council apparently only became aware of this when they discovered that Rochester was not on the Lord Chancellor's Office's list of cities. Medway applied for city status in the 2000 and 2002 competitions, but was unsuccessful. In 2010, it started to refer to the "City of Medway" in promotional material, but it was rebuked and instructed not to do so in future by the Advertising Standards Authority. Medway Council made a further bid for city status in 2012, when three cities were afforded the honour as part of The Queen's Diamond Jubilee civic honours competition. Ultimately Medway was unsuccessful with the eventual winners being Chelmsford (Essex), Perth (Perthshire), and St Asaph (Denbighshire).

=== Politics ===
The council comprises 59 councillors representing different wards. The party political breakdown of the council following the 2023 local elections is:

Affiliation	Councillors
Labour Party	33
Conservative Party	22
Independent	4

Parts of the unitary authority are parished, chiefly the rural areas. There are currently 11 parishes:

- Allhallows
- Cliffe and Cliffe Woods
- Cooling
- Cuxton
- Frindsbury Extra
- Halling
- High Halstow
- Hoo St Werburgh
- St James Isle of Grain
- St Mary Hoo
- Stoke

== Education ==
Medway operates a two-tier education system, with academic selection for admission to secondary schools determined by the eleven plus exam. There are a number of grammar schools located in the area, the other secondary schools in Medway being non-selective (apart from one faith schools and the school on the peninsula). There are also a number of private schools operating in the area. Medway is also home to the third largest home school population of children in the UK after the Isles of Scilly and Isle of Wight.

== Demographics ==
=== Population ===
The population of Medway stood at 279,800 as of the 2021 census, representing a 6% increase from 263,900 in 2011, lower than the increase of 6.6% for England.

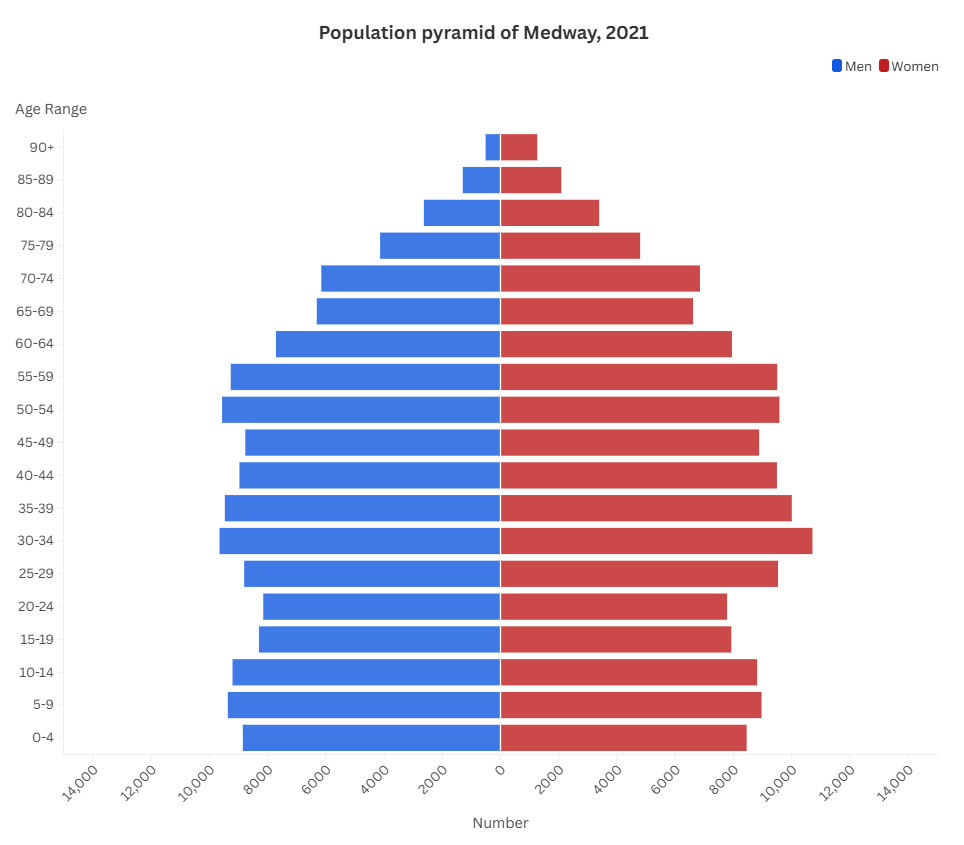
Population pyramid of Medway according to the 2021 United Kingdom census

Top 10 countries of birth in 2021
Country of birth	Population
United Kingdom	241,119
Nigeria	3,993
India	3,711
Poland	2,339
Romania	2,133
Republic of Ireland	1,458
Germany	1,261
Lithuania	1,100
Pakistan	994
Bangladesh	931
South Africa	871

=== Religion ===
Religious affiliation in Medway
Religion	2021	2011	Change with 2011
Christianity	126,097	152,637	▼26,540
Atheism	120,125	78,995	▲41,316
Islam	7,636	5,169	▲2,467
Sikhism	4,363	3,846	▲517
Hinduism	3,172	2,756	▲416
Buddhism	999	937	▲62
Paganism	437	Not reported	▲437
Judaism	217	208	▲9
Ravidassia	181	Not reported	▲181
Other religions	1,272	1,392	▼120
No answer	15,273	17,985	▼2,712
Total	279,772	263,965	▲15,807

== Economy ==
=== Chatham Dockyard ===
The economy of Medway was previously dominated by ship-building from Chatham Dockyard. When the Dockyard closed in March 1984, 7,000 workers lost their jobs and a further 10,000 in supporting industries lost their jobs. Nevertheless, the Chatham Historic Dockyard, a maritime museum on the site contributed £27.8 million to the GVA of Medway in 2023, as well as supporting 580 jobs through 200 businesses situated on the site, such as Dovetail Games.

=== General statistics ===
This is a chart of trend of regional gross value added of Medway at current basic prices published (pp. 240–253) by Office for National Statistics with figures in millions of pounds Sterling.

Year	Regional Gross Value Added (£m) (Note: Includes hunting and forestry)	GVA per capita	Agriculture (Note: Includes energy and construction)	Industry (Note: Includes financial intermediation services indirectly measured)	Services (Note: Components may not sum to totals due to rounding)
1995	1,823	-	21	560	1,243
2000	2,348	-	8	745	1,595
2003	2,671	-	10	802	1,859
2023	7,657	26,698	-	-	-

== Culture ==
Medway's cultural strategy is managed by Creative Medway, a sector-led organization that brings together businesses, cultural organizations, and freelancers.

Medway has five theatres, two operated by the local council and three independently run. The council-operated theatres are:

- The Central Theatre (966 seats), which hosts a variety of tribute acts.
- The Brook Theatre (400 seats), located in the Old Town Hall, featuring a range of performances.

The independent theatres include:

- Medway Little Theatre (96 seats).
- The Oasthouse Theatre.
- Kings Theatre (110 seats).

=== Leisure and recreation ===
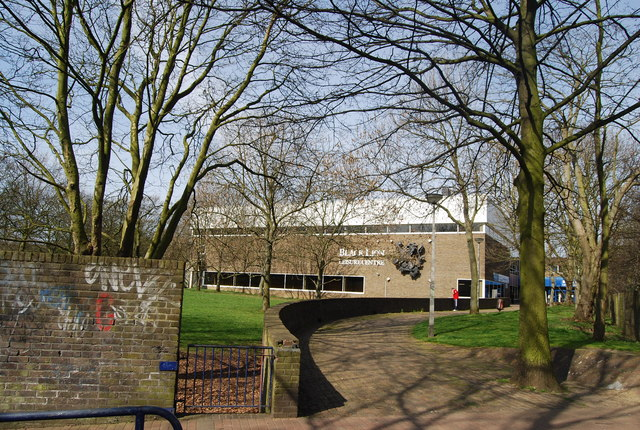
A view of the former Black Lion Leisure Centre (now Medway Park) on April 5, 2009.

- Medway Park Sports Centre (formerly The Black Lion Leisure Centre) in Gillingham is a sub-regional sports centre with three indoor pools for swimming and SCUBA diving, a gym, a fitness centre, a sports hall, and squash courts. It includes the Jumpers Rebound Centre for trampolining. Medway Park was upgraded as part of the Medway 2012 programme, which aimed to secure local benefits from the London Olympics.
- The Black Lion Skatepark was a concrete skatepark on the site of the Black Lion Field. Built in 1978 during the late-1970s boom of skateboarding and BMX, it was active until its closure in 1987.
- The Strand Leisure Park in Gillingham has an open-air swimming pool on the banks of the River Medway as well as other leisure attractions including tennis courts and a narrow-gauge railway.
- Strood Sports Centre in has an indoor swimming pool, gym, sports hall, squash courts and an astroturf sports pitch.
- Gillingham has an ice rink, The Ice Bowl, home to a local ice hockey team, the Invicta Dynamos who play in the NIHL South Division 1.
- Gillingham F.C. are the main football team of the area. They play in Football League Two.
- John Nike Ski Centre – located in Capstone near Hempstead
- Cozenton Park Sports Centre in Rainham, Kent, replaced the former Splashes Leisure Centre, which was demolished in 2022. The new £23.65 million facility, opened in 2024, features a 25m swimming pool, a leisure pool with a flume and wave ball, a gym, and multi-purpose studios.
- Medway Dragons Rugby League Football Club operate out the Royal School of Military Engineering sports facilities and Medway Park for Wheelchair Rugby League

== Transport ==
=== Roadways ===
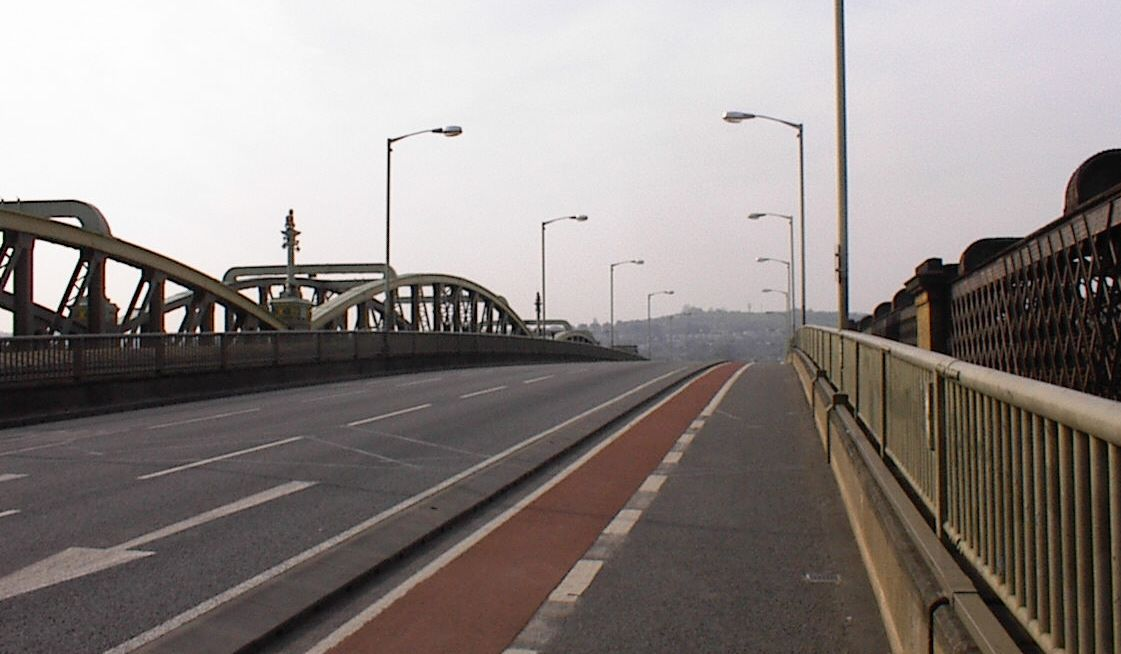
The A2 crossing the Medway at Rochester on the site of the Roman crossings, the medieval crossing was to the south

Watling Street (the A2), the Roman road between the Port of Dover on the English Channel and London, runs through Medway. This route became particularly congested and led to the building of the M2 to bypass the Medway Towns to the south in the 1960s and was subsequently widened extensively at the turn of the 21st century. The A2 through the Medway Towns varies from single carriageway to dual carriageway to "one way" systems. In places it deviates from the original route of Watling Street.

The A2 leaves the main route (which bypasses Medway by either the Northern Relief Road — The A289 or the M2) at the Three Crutches junction. The road descends through Strood towards the river. During the descent, the road to Gravesend, the A226 joins. In Strood the High Street is bypassed by the one-way system to the north and south encircling the High Street. The A2 crosses the Medway via two bridges in a dual carriageway (see Rochester Bridge). One bridge is Victorian and in the position of the original Roman bridge. The second bridge is more recent and build upon the piers of the original London, Chatham and Dover Railway (LCDR) main line railway bridge (the Chatham Main Line uses the South Eastern Railway's branch line's bridge).

In Rochester the High street is bypassed to the north by the dualled Corporation Street. The A2 then crosses the high street, climbs Star Hill and follows New road by Fort Pitt / Jackson's Field to bypass Chatham to the south (by the Station, via a flyover known as New Cut). As it approaches Luton it is a dual carriageway for a short stretch, where a major junction lies with the railway (Chatham Main line) passes overhead — this is known as Luton Arches. It then climbs Chatham Hill (to Gillingham) now has a separate bus lane. The A2 / Watling street traditionally bypasses central Gillingham which lies to the North. From the main road to Gillingham (Canterbury Street), the A2 is dual carriageway. Here the Northern Relief Road (A289) rejoins at the Will Adams roundabout. This is swiftly followed by the Bowater roundabout where the A278 Hoath Way leads to the M2 to the South, this is so named and distinctive because of the former paper mill Bowaters at this location that left a giant water tower. A large Tesco supermarket currently inhabits the site. As the road progresses into Rainham it becomes single carriageway again.

Connecting Medway with neighbouring Gravesend is the A226. This leaves the A2 on the hill above Strood. It is a single carriageway A road.

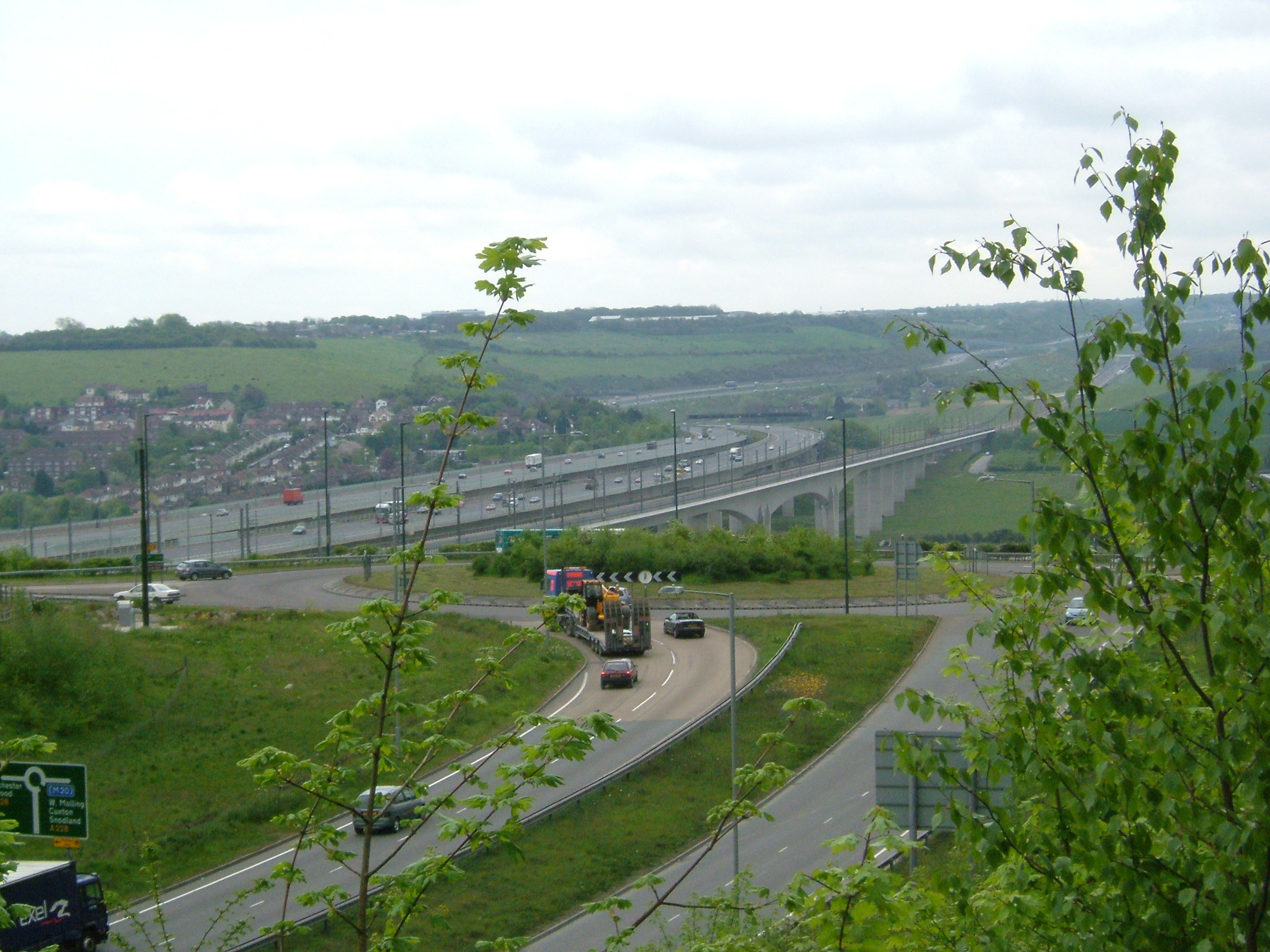
Junction Two of the M2 is on the A228, just before the Medway motorway bridge. Alongside is High Speed 1. Both are seen climbing up the Nashenden Valley, towards Bluebell Hill.

The A228 runs along the west bank of the Medway, through Strood. Intersecting the M2 at its second junction, crossing the A2 through the centre of Strood and meeting (and encompassing for a short stretch) the Northern Relief Road (A289). The road then carries on to the Isle of Grain. Throughout its passage through Strood it is single carriageway, but the stretches to the North are dualled partially toward Grain. The road to Grain was an accident black spot, this and increased traffic from the major port of Thamesport which is located to the north-west along the Medway Estuary prompted the construction of a new dual carriageway. The A228 Main Road to Ropers Lane project was provisionally approved by the government in December 2001. Design work started in March 2000 and in February 2004, contractors got under way with moving services such as water, gas and fuel pipes. This work was vital, as the pipes actually supply the Hoo Peninsula and the power station at Grain. The largest water main that was moved was 24 inches (610 mm) in diameter and the largest gas main 36 inches (910 mm). The road cost £19 million and is approximately 2.5 miles (4.0 km) long.

The A229 starts from the A2 at the junction at the top of Star Hill alongside Jackson's Field / Fort Pitt, it follows City Way to the South where at Fort Horstead / Rochester Airport / Mid Kent College it meets the branch from Chatham (the A230 which starts at Chatham Station / New Cut). From here it continues south, becoming dual carriageway and meeting the M2 at its third junction, which also provides access with Walderslade. This road then proceeds down Blue Bell Hill (from the summit of the North Downs) to the county town of Maidstone and the M20.

The A278 Hoath Way links the A2 at Gillingham to its southern suburbs (Hempstead, Wigmore and Parkwood) to the M2's fourth junction. It is dual carriageway throughout.

The A289 was built in the 1990s as the Medway Towns Northern Relief Road. Constructed in three stages, firstly it bypasses Strood with a dual carriageway from Three Crutches (M2 J1) to the A226 and the A228 (The Wainscott Northern Bypass). It then joins the A228 (as The Wainscott Eastern Bypass) — these two parts are dualled. A dualled link road leads to the Medway Tunnel to the Chatham Dockyard. Here it meets Dock Road (A231) that leads to Chatham. The A289 continues between northern Gillingham and the river, and then turns southwards through Gillingham Golf Course to rejoin the A2 at the Will Adams roundabout.

The A2045 is the A289's counterpart, however it is largely unbuilt. The Medway Towns Southern Relief Road was proposed to link the (then) new developments to the south of Chatham (Walderslade) and Gillingham (Hempstead, Wigmore and Parkwood) with M2's J3 and the A229 to the east and the M2's J4 and A278 in the west. A single carriageway road was built south of Walderslade to access the Walderslade Woods and Lordswood developments. At the other end a small section was built to access the Hempstead development and its shopping centre. However, the key middle stretch was left unbuilt, a link road to central Chatham via Luton, the B2156 North Dane Way was also left incomplete with no road to link to. The removal of Medway from Kent (which the incomplete section would lay in) and the recent widening of M2 leaves the proposed project with little chance of completion in the foreseeable future.

=== Buses ===
The majority of local bus routes throughout Medway are centred upon the newly opened Waterfront bus station (replacing Pentagon bus station) in Chatham. Most bus routes are run by Arriva Southern Counties, which took over the locally owned Maidstone & District bus company in the 1990s. Other local bus companies including Nu-Venture provide certain services, some under contract to the local authority. Buses are numbered between 100 and 199 for local services, with buses numbered in the 700s to show Kent County Council subsidised services including those to Walderslade and Bluewater Shopping Centre, and in the 600s for school bus services.

Bus links to London and other parts of the south east can be accessed via Bluewater Shopping Centre, near Greenhithe, which has extensive bus routes to London.

=== Coaches ===
Commuter coaches run from various parts of Medway to a selection of London destinations using the M2/A2. Operating companies include The Kings Ferry and Chalkwell Coaches.

National Express runs regular services from Hempstead Valley Shopping Centre, Chatham Waterfront bus station, and Chatham Maritime Universities to Gatwick Airport.

=== Railways ===
The Medway Council area has seven railway stations:

- Strood Station
- Rochester Station
- Chatham Station
- Gillingham Station
- Rainham Station
- Halling Station
- Cuxton Station

It is served by the Medway Valley line, the North Kent line and the Chatham Main Line.

The owners of the Thames and Medway Canal tunnel that linked Medway (specifically Strood) with Gravesend turned half their canal into a railway bringing the first rails to Medway. They were soon absorbed by the South Eastern Railway whose North Kent line linked Strood with Gravesend, Dartford, and then London Bridge. Subsequently, SER extended their branch from their main line to Maidstone to Strood — the Medway Valley line. Stations were built on the Medway Valley line for the villages of Cuxton and Halling.

A rival company, the London, Chatham and Dover Railway, built a railway between Chatham and East Kent. Unable to secure a connection and running rights over the SER's North Kent line they built their own main line to Bromley where they connected with the West End of London & Crystal Palace Railway to gain access to London Victoria. This railway became known as the Chatham Main Line. It had stations at Rochester Bridge which was actually in Strood, Chatham and New Brompton which was renamed Gillingham. The line was extended through Rainham to the Kent Coast (Thanet and Dover).

In reaction to this strong rival the SER built a small branch alongside the LCDR over the Medway on a parallel bridge to a station in Rochester and a terminus called Chatham Central which was actually just outside Chatham.

The strenuous competition between the two companies resulted in their merger into the South Eastern and Chatham Railway in 1899. Subsequent rationalisation saw the closure of the LCDR's station in Strood and the SER's branch to Rochester and Chatham (although the bridge was retained and is used to this day).

Post World War I saw the big four grouping and the SECR was merged into Southern in 1923. This led to electrification of suburban services (750 V DC third rail) which by World War II had seen electric traction reach Gillingham on the Chatham Main Line and Maidstone West (via Strood and the North Kent Line) on the Medway Valley line.

Post war (1948) saw nationalisation into British Rail, which under its 1955 modernisation part saw the completion of Southern's electrification efforts in Kent as a key target. Thus Rainham was reached as part of this programme. It also saw the extension of platforms on the Chatham Main Line to 12 cars, leading to the closure of two of Chatham's four platforms. Rochester retained four platforms, while Strood and Gillingham kept three. Rainham had only two platforms until 2017 when an additional bay was created to facilitate new trains on through services to destinations north of London. These are scheduled to commence in May 2018. In December 2015, a new Rochester station opened replacing the original one. It has three platforms and can handle 12-car trains.

Extensive goods yards existed at Strood, Rochester and Gillingham. Strood had engine sheds, while Gillingham still has carriage depots. A freight branch to Chatham Dockyard also exists. The network within the dockyard has been extensively curtailed since the dockyard's closure.

Rail services generally consist of North Kent Line services (to London Bridge and beyond — Charing Cross and Cannon Street) starting from Gillingham. The Medway Valley line receives a shuttle service up and down terminating at Strood for transfers to the North Kent Line, although some services run through to Tonbridge and even Gatwick. The main services are on the Chatham Main line, with stopper services from Faversham (i.e. they stop at local stations, running fast from Bromley) and fast services from Kent Coast (i.e. they run fast from Medway to London). Services are currently operated by Southeastern.

The High Speed 1 line passes through the Medway Towns area, running parallel to the M2/A2 Trunk road. The completion of High Speed 1 has seen domestic services operating on the line, which includes a stopping service starting at Faversham running to Strood and Gravesend before joining the High Speed line at Ebbsfleet. From there it travels at high speed to Stratford International and St Pancras International, where connections can now be made with mainline trains to the north of England. The rail service is extensively used by the residents of Medway to commute into London.

=== Waterways ===
Although it is extensively used for leisure, the River Medway is not used for local transport purposes; however, cargo ships operated by Union Transport of Bromley still sail to the cement works to the south at Halling/Cuxton. Part of the closed Royal Navy base is now used as a cargo port and has Ro/Ro facilities; cargo that comes in ranges from paper pulp to dredged material, but this traffic only uses one of the three main basins. There is also a ship repair facility located in the basin. Thamesport, which is located on the edge of the Medway Estuary on the Isle of Grain, handles the shipping of containers and fossil fuels. Kingsnorth Power Station has coal shipped in from Dunkirk. Scotline also operates a fleet of coasters for the import of wood, and has a wharf on the River Medway. There is also a wharf on the river called Eurowharf, which deals with dredged material. In addition, there was a shipping company based on the river, formerly known as Lapthorn Shipping but then as Coastal Bulk Shipping, but it ceased trading at the end of 2008.

=== Air ===
There are two small airports. The first, Rochester Airport, is a "grass strip" used for leisure purposes. Stoke Airfield near Grain is used by microlights and light aircraft. For scheduled air travel, Medway residents can use Kent's Lydd Airport (or Manston Airport until its 2014 closure), but these lack extensive passenger facilities or routes; thus, the main London airports are used instead in most cases.

== Notable people ==
See sections in the constituent towns.

- William Adams, the first Englishman to record reaching Japan, was born in Gillingham. The Japanese Shogun made him a samurai (warrior). He is significant to Medway because this has led to the twinning with Yokosuka and Itō, the latter being the location of the shogun shipbuilding sites most associated with William Adams.
- Charles Dickens lived in Medway; a museum was in Eastgate House in Rochester until its closure in 2004 which was later reopened in July 2017 after a £2.1m revamp. A visitor attraction based on his works was located at Chatham Dockside until October 2016, when it closed.
- Thomas Aveling, engineer, lived in this village on the Hoo Peninsula, where he invented and tested his steamrollers.
- Actress and model Kelly Brook was born in Rochester and attended the Thomas Aveling School.
- Artist, musician and poet Billy Childish.
- Bill Lewis, poet (founder member of The Medway Poets, mythographer, founder member of the Stuckist art group and member of Colony: A Community of Artists.
- Marxist scholar David Harvey was born and brought up in Gillingham.
- Thomas Hodgskin, an early socialist whose writing on the political economy influenced Karl Marx.
- Francis Drake lived in Upnor and learnt to sail on the Medway.
- Chris Smalling English footballer attended Chatham Grammar School for Boys
- Jools Holland, musician and the host of Later... with Jools Holland, lives in the Cooling Castle on the Hoo Peninsula.
- River Medway, a contestant on RuPaul's Drag Race UK Series 3, placing 6th alongside Choriza May.

== Twin towns ==
Medway is twinned with:

- Valenciennes (France)
- Yokosuka and Itō (Japan)
- Cádiz (Spain)
- Foshan (China)
- Pokhara (Nepal)

== Freedom of the Borough ==
The following people, military units and Organisations and Groups have received the Freedom of the Borough of Medway.

=== Military units ===
- The Royal Corps of Engineers: 17 January 2008.
- HMS Chatham, RN: 12 February 2011.
- "C" Company 3rd Battalion The Princess of Wales's Royal Regiment: 25 January 2018.
- The Royal Marines.

=== Organisations and groups ===
- The Royal Naval Association (Chatham Branch): 21 July 2022.
- The Chatham Historic Dockyard Trust: 21 July 2022.
- The Medway NHS Foundation Trust: 19 October 2023.

== See also ==
- Listed buildings in Medway
