= M2 motorway (Great Britain) =

Road in Kent, England

M2

- M2 highlighted in blue Shown with UK motorway network

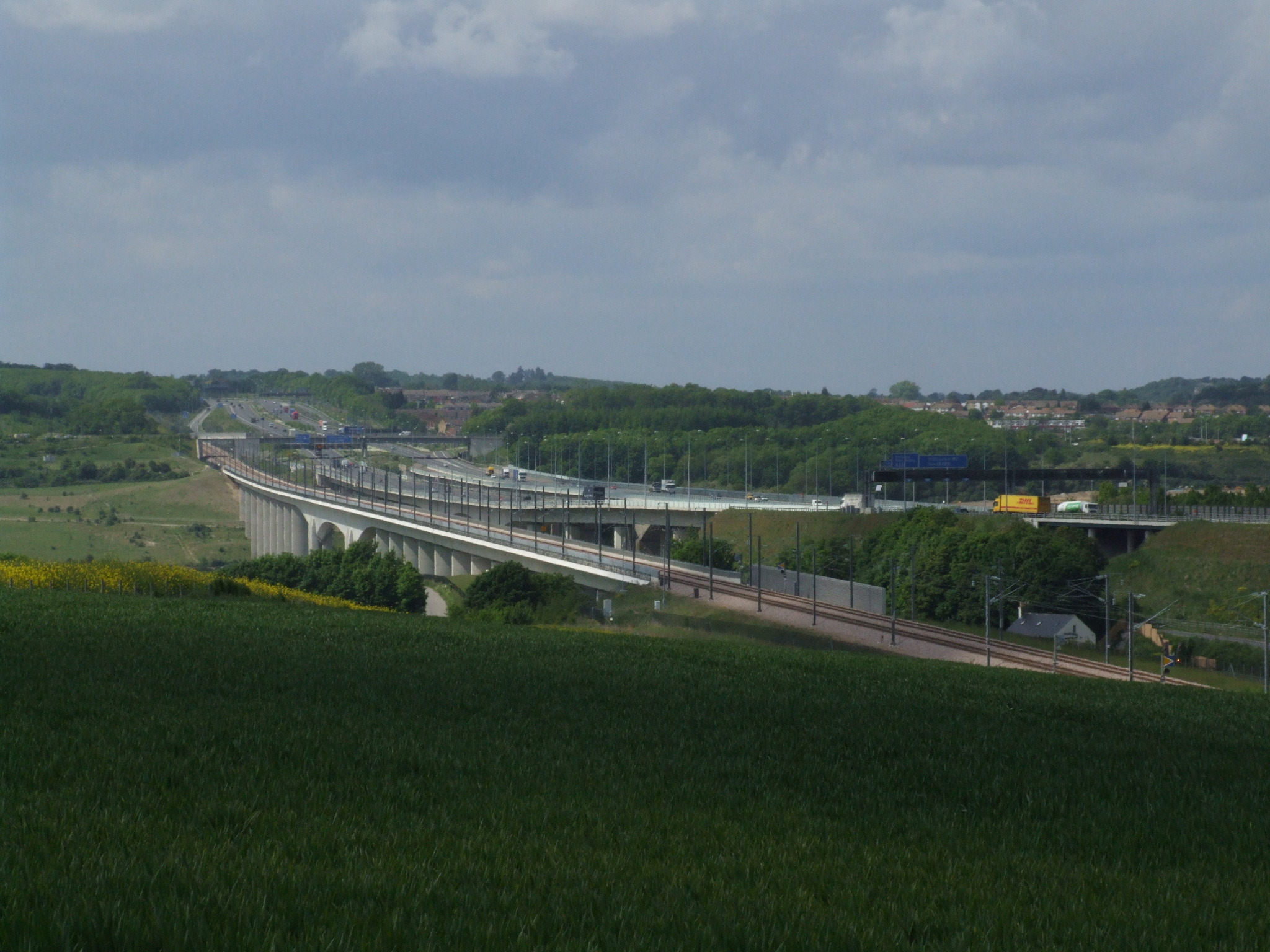
- A picture of the Medway Viaducts in 2008.

Route information
- Maintained by National Highways
- Existed: 1963–present
- History: Opened: 1963; Completed: 1965

Major junctions
- West end: Shorne
- East end: Faversham

Location
- Country: United Kingdom
- Counties: Kent

Road network
- Roads in the United Kingdom; Motorways; A and B road zones
← M1	→ M3

The M2 is a 25-mile (40 km) motorway in Kent, England that bypasses the A2 through Medway, Sittingbourne, and Faversham. It serves as a major link between London, North Kent, and the Isle of Sheppey. The M2 also forms part of a major crossing of the River Medway. With seven junctions serving both local and regional destinations, the motorway connects back to the A2 at both ends. At its eastern end, the M2 flows directly onto the A299 towards Ramsgate.

== History ==
=== 1959–65: Development and opening of the original motorway ===
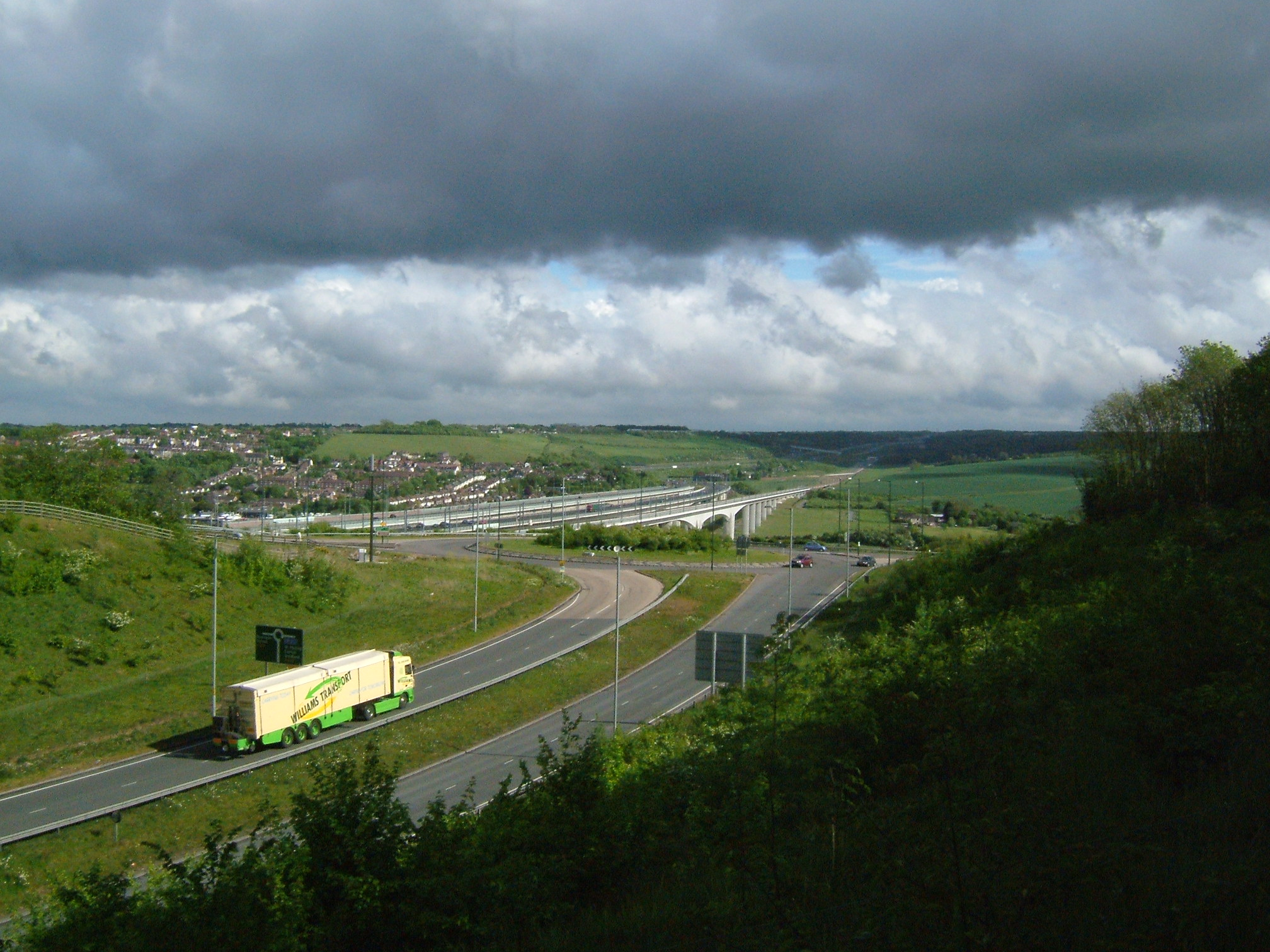
Junction 2 of the M2

The M2 was originally planned to be a direct link between London and the Channel Ports, which later materialised as the M20. The current route was planned to open as the A2(M). However, after the Daily Telegraph published an article that misnamed the A2(M) as the M2, the Ministry of Transport changed the number of the motorway. In 1959, tenders were issued for the original 17-span Medway Viaduct, which cost £2.5 million to construct. The section of the M2 between junctions 2 and 5 was opened by Ernest Marples on 29 May 1963. The rest of the M2 from junctions 1 to 2 and junctions 5 to 7 opened in 1965.

=== 1966: Cancelled extension and A2 improvements ===
The Ministry of Transport originally planned to extend the M2 to London and Dover. Instead, due to a lack of traffic demand, the A2 was upgraded to a dual carriageway from Faversham to Dover and to a six-lane dual carriageway with hard shoulders from Strood to Swanscombe towards London.

=== 1980–2003: Traffic congestion and improvements around Medway ===
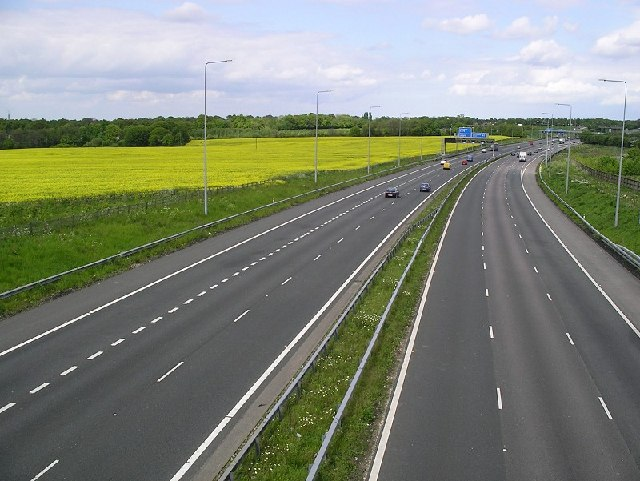
The widened section approaching junction 4

Mitigating traffic congestion on the M2 was considered as early as 1980 when a proposal to ban heavy goods vehicles from using the second lane on an uphill section of the M2 was debated in Parliament. In the late 1990s, junction 1 was rebuilt to accommodate a link to the Medway Tunnel, which opened as the A289. From 2000 to 2003, the M2 was widened from four to eight lanes from junctions 1 to 3 and to six lanes from junctions 3 to 4. A new bridge was built in parallel with the original Medway Viaduct to double capacity.

=== 1993–97: Coach crash and criminal inquest ===
On 10 November 1993, a coach carrying 44 passengers to Canterbury Cathedral lost control and crashed on the M2 near Faversham. 10 people, including the driver, died from injuries sustained during the crash. A disabled speed limiter was blamed for the accident, as it was later discovered that the coach was travelling at 78 mph before the crash. In 1997, the criminal inquest was thrown out despite the jury finding that the deceased passengers had been unlawfully killed.

=== 2014 sinkhole incident ===
On 11 February 2014, a 16-foot (4.9 m) by 6-foot (1.8 m) sinkhole was discovered in the central reservation of the M2 between junctions 5 and 6. The Highways Agency closed the motorway to monitor the sinkhole, which led to severe traffic congestion. It partially reopened the motorway to traffic on 13 February. After further inspections the sinkhole was filled in, and the motorway fully reopened to traffic by 20 February.

=== 2021–2025: Junction 5 improvements ===
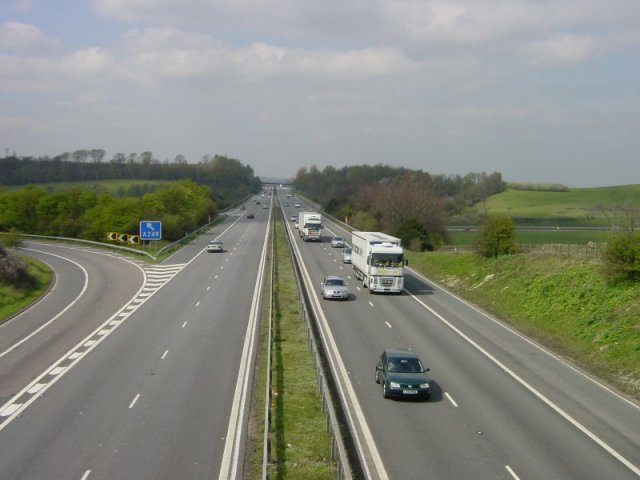
Junction 5 of the M2

From June 2021 to February 2025, National Highways remodelled junction 5 of the M2 at a cost of £100 million to provide a flyover for A249 through traffic and improved connections between the M2 and A249. The main aims of the scheme were to improve capacity, connectivity and safety.

== Junctions ==
County	Location	mi	km	Junction	Destinations	Notes
Kent	Strood	27.0; 27.5	43.4; 44.3	1 (Note: 51.3995°N 0.4433°E)	A2 - London, Dartford Crossing A289 - Gillingham	The road continues westwards as the A2 towards London.
Kent	Strood	28.8; 29.0	46.3; 46.6	2 (Note: 51.3838°N 0.4680°E)	A228 - Rochester, West Malling	
Kent	Chatham	32.6; 32.8	52.4; 52.8	3 (Note: 51.3373°N 0.5079°E)	A229 - Chatham, Rochester, Maidstone	
Kent	Gillingham	36.4; 36.5	58.5; 58.8	4 (Note: 51.3362°N 0.5844°E)	A278 - Gillingham	
Kent	Rainham			Services (Note: 51.3412°N 0.6078°E)	Medway services	
Kent	Stockbury	40.4; 40.3	64.4; 64.9	5 (Note: 51.3299°N 0.6623°E)	A249 - Sittingbourne, Maidstone, Sheerness	
Kent	Faversham	50.6; 50.8	81.5; 81.8	6 (Note: 51.3006°N 0.8884°E)	A251 - Faversham, Ashford	
Kent	Faversham	52.3; 52.6	84.2; 84.7	7 (Note: 51.3015°N 0.9254°E)	A2 - Canterbury, Dover, Channel Tunnel A299 - Margate, Ramsgate	The road continues eastwards as the A299 towards Ramsgate.
1.000 mi = 1.609 km; 1.000 km = 0.621 mi

Notes

- Distances in kilometres and carriageway identifiers are obtained from driver location signs/location marker posts. Where a junction spans several hundred metres and the data is available, both the start and finish values for the junction are shown.
- Coordinate data from ACME Mapper.

Coordinate list

== See also ==
- List of motorways in the United Kingdom
