= Medway Tunnel =

Tunnel linking Strood with Chatham in Kent, England

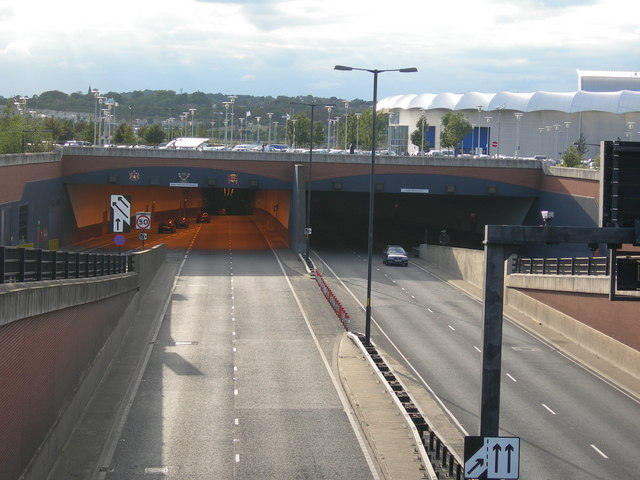
- A view of the Medway Tunnel
- Interactive map of Medway Tunnel

Overview
- Location: connecting Strood to Chatham in Kent, UK
- Coordinates: 51.400357°N 0.526721°E
- Status: active
- Route: A289 connecting Strood with Chatham in Kent, under the River Medway, in the UK
- Crosses: River Medway

Operation
- Constructed: May 1992 – June 1996
- Opened: 22 June 1996; 30 years ago
- Operator: Medway Council
- Traffic: vehicle
- Character: public
- Toll: none (free)

Technical
- Length: 2,360 ft (720 m)
- No. of lanes: 2 (each way)
- Operating speed: 50 miles per hour (80 km/h)

The Medway Tunnel is a tunnel under the River Medway linking Strood with Chatham in Kent, England. It forms part of the A289 Medway Towns Northern Relief Road. The Medway Tunnel is the first immersed tube tunnel to be built in England and only the second of this type in the UK, the other at Conwy, North Wales.

== History ==
=== Proposal and construction ===
The Rochester Bridge had been the lowest river crossing of the River Medway for centuries, and despite expansion in the 1970s was very congested. In the late 1980s, the Medway Tunnel was proposed downstream of the Bridge to relieve congestion on the bridge, to allow greater access to the Medway Towns and assist with redevelopment of Chatham Dockyard.

Medway Tunnel Act 1990
- Act of Parliament
- Parliament of the United Kingdom
- Long title: An Act to authorise the Wardens and Assistants of Rochester Bridge in the county of Kent to construct works and to acquire lands; and for other purposes.
- Citation: 1990 c. xxii

Dates
- Royal assent: 26 July 1990

Text of statute as originally enacted

The Medway Tunnel Bill – promoted by the Rochester Bridge Trust – was submitted to Parliament in 1988. The Medway Tunnel Act 1990 (c. xxii) was passed granting the Rochester Bridge Trust the power to build and own the tunnel.

The £80m project was carried out by an HBM Civil Engineering / Tarmac Construction joint venture, and started in May 1992. The tunnel itself was constructed in three distinct sections. The central part of the tunnel is the 370 metres (1,210 ft) of immersed tube, which is linked to cut and cover tunnels on both the Strood and Chatham banks of the river, with a total tunnel length of 720 metres (2,360 ft).

As part of the construction project, 800 metres (2,600 ft) of new dual carriageway and a new junction was built to connect the new tunnel to the existing road network. Separate from the project, various bypasses and link roads were constructed to provide access to the local area - the A289 Medway Northern Relief Road.

The Medway Tunnel was officially opened by the Princess Royal on 12 June 1996. In 1996, it won an award from the UK's Concrete Society.

=== Running costs ===
In 2008 negotiations were completed by Medway Council which purchased the freehold of the tunnel from the Trust for £1 with a £3.6m contribution on future costs.

== Operation ==
As of March 2023, the tunnel is used by around 40,000 vehicles per day.

Cyclists are currently not allowed to travel through the tunnel which is not part of the local cycle network.
