= Listed buildings in Medway =

Historic structures in Kent, England

There are about 650 Listed Buildings in Medway, which are buildings of architectural or historic interest.

- Grade I buildings are of exceptional interest.
- Grade II* buildings are particularly important buildings of more than special interest.
- Grade II buildings are of special interest.

The lists follow Historic England’s geographical organisation, with entries grouped by county, local authority, and parish (civil and non-civil). The following lists are arranged by parish; for ease of presentation, the non-civil parish area is divided into western and eastern lists.

Parish	Listed buildings list	Grade I	Grade II*	Grade II	Total
Allhallows	Listed buildings in Allhallows, Kent				
Cliffe and Cliffe Woods	Listed buildings in Cliffe and Cliffe Woods				
Cooling	Listed buildings in Cooling, Kent				
Cuxton	Listed buildings in Cuxton				
Frindsbury Extra	Listed buildings in Frindsbury Extra	3	1	24	28
Halling	Listed buildings in Halling, Kent				
High Halstow	Listed buildings in High Halstow				
Hoo St Werburgh	Listed buildings in Hoo St Werburgh				
Isle of Grain	Listed buildings in the Isle of Grain				
Medway non-civil	Listed buildings in Medway, non civil parish (Chatham, Gillingham, Rainham); Listed buildings in Medway, non civil parish (Frindsbury, Rochester, Strood)	35	72	416	523
St Mary Hoo	Listed buildings in St Mary Hoo				
Stoke	Listed buildings in Stoke, Kent				
