= North Kent Marshes =

Marshland in Kent, England

Coordinates: 51°29′N 0°30′E

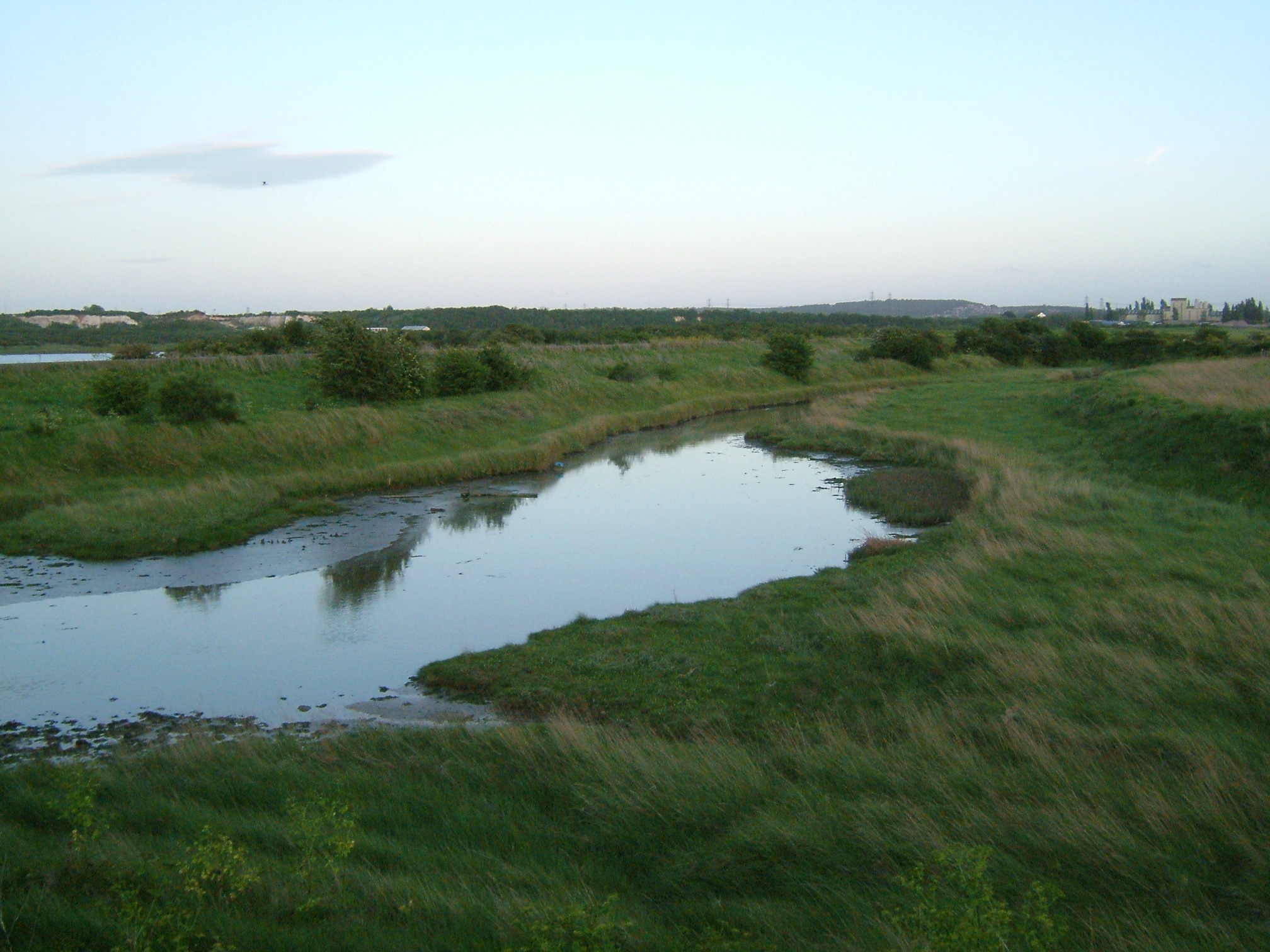
Cliffe Creek Fleet. The complex landscape of the marshes, in the foreground a fleet, then a bank and one of the Pools managed by the RSPB, then the chalk outcrop, heavily quarried, where one finds Cliffe village.

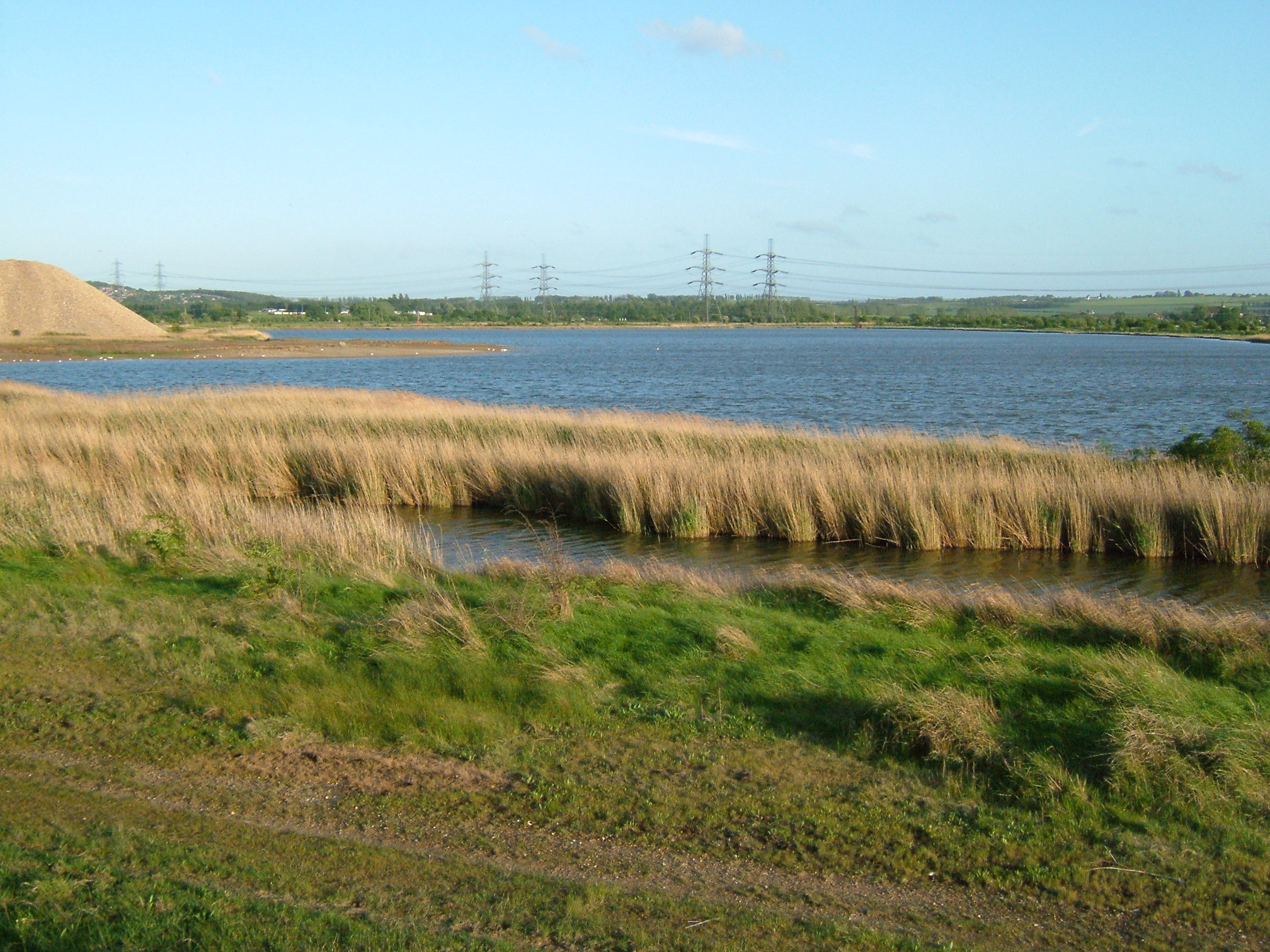
Cliffe pools with a bird population, the site is still used for mineral extraction

The North Kent Marshes in the far north of the county of Kent span the dry and wet south banks and inlets of the Thames Estuary in south-east England. The marshes are one of 22 environmentally sensitive areas recognised by the UK's Department for Environment, Food and Rural Affairs (DEFRA). They are in the Thames Gateway regional planning area. They include the 5,289-hectare (20.4 sq mi) South Thames Estuary and Marshes biological SSSI.

== Governance ==
The marshes are nearly contiguous and span the districts of Dartford, Gravesham, Medway, Swale and Canterbury.

They are protected in the Kent and Medway Structure Plan. In successive Local Plans, required by UK Planning Law they have been included, regard being had to their environmental benefit. The marshes serve as emergency natural flood protection for London.

== Ecology ==
Most of the northern edge of Kent, west of the relatively modest Thanet peninsula, has been marshland for millennia. Steeper gravel beaches with hills behind and segments of low cliff in the east at Whitstable and Herne Bay form the most notable exceptions, along a stretch of about 4 miles (6.4 km). The almost 35 miles (56 km) of marshes, in many places reaching 1–2 miles (1.6–3.2 km) inland, stretch from the large town of Dartford in the west, to the west of Whitstable in the east. In the centre of the marshes are the semi-suburban grouping of the Medway Towns: Chatham, Gillingham and Rochester. Sittingbourne and Faversham are also located on the marshes. The Saxon Shore Way runs along the coast of the marshes, and onwards to Hastings on the south coast.

The marshes have been recognised as one of the most important natural wetlands in northern Europe, and they are monitored by local landowners and wildlife custodians. According to the RSPB, up to 300,000 migrant birds use the mudflats of the Thames marshes as a haven each year in their migratory journeys between the Arctic and Africa.

The RSPB have acquired considerable stretches of Cliffe marshes on the Hoo peninsula. They maintain reserves at Cliffe pools, Northward hill, High Halstow and Elmley Marshes, Sheppey. The Medway Council's riverside park at Gillingham is also managed, public-access marshland.

The North Kent Marshes' stable water level provides an important habitat for water vole. Shorne and Higham marshes, with parts of Cliffe and Cooling marsh, Allhallows and Grain marshes and Sheppey here are three of their thirteen main habitats in Britain.

== Cultural references ==
- Charles Dickens' novel Great Expectations is partly set in the marshes.
- Books by Nicola Barker are set in the marshes.
- The Channel Four series Southcliffe (2013) was set in a market town amid the marshes. Most of the series was filmed in and around Faversham.

== See also ==
- South Swale - a nature reserve covering the marshes between Faversham and Whitstable
- South Thames Estuary and Marshes - the parts of the marshes currently having SSSI status.
