= Upper Bush =

Hamlet in Kent, England

Coordinates: 51°22′31″N 0°26′04″E

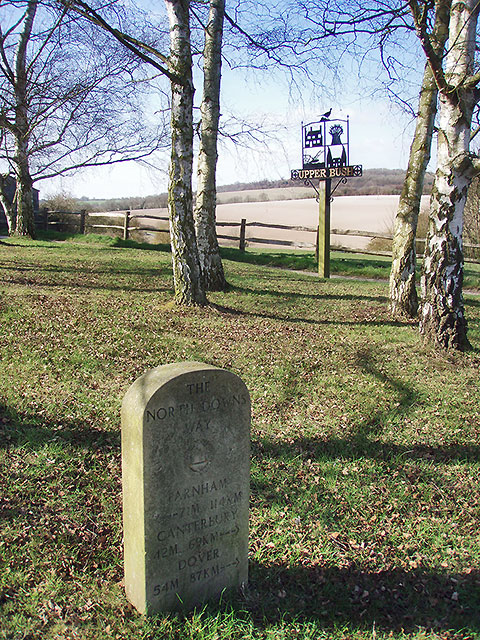
Upper Bush North Downs Way milestone

Upper Bush is a hamlet in the parish of Cuxton, in the unitary authority of Medway, in Kent, England.

The hamlet has only a few houses, including two Grade II listed buildings; Barrow Hill House and High Birch

The North Downs Way long-distance path leads through the village, between Cuxton and Upper Halling.
