= Cliffe, Kent =

Village in Kent, England

Cliffe
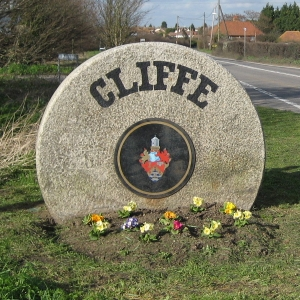

- Location within Kent
- OS grid reference: TQ7347976679
- Civil parish: Cliffe and Cliffe Woods
- Unitary authority: Medway
- Ceremonial county: Kent
- Region: South East
- Country: England
- Sovereign state: United Kingdom
- Post town: ROCHESTER
- Postcode district: ME3
- Dialling code: 01634
- Police: Kent
- Fire: Kent
- Ambulance: South East Coast
- UK Parliament: Rochester and Strood

Cliffe is a village in the civil parish of Cliffe and Cliffe Woods, in the borough of Medway in the ceremonial county of Kent, England. It is on the Hoo Peninsula, reached from the Medway Towns by a three-mile (4.8 km) journey along the B2000 road. Situated upon a low chalk escarpment overlooking the Thames marshes, Cliffe offers views of Southend-on-Sea and London. In 774 Offa, King of Mercia, built a rustic wooden church dedicated to St Helen, a popular Mercian saint who was by legend the daughter of Coel ("Old King Cole") of Colchester. Cliffe is cited in early records as having been called Clive and Cliffe-at-Hoo. In 1961 the parish had a population of 2239. On 1 April 1997 the parish was abolished to form "Cliffe & Cliffe Woods", part of which consisting of Frindsbury Extra.

== Ancient Saxon town ==
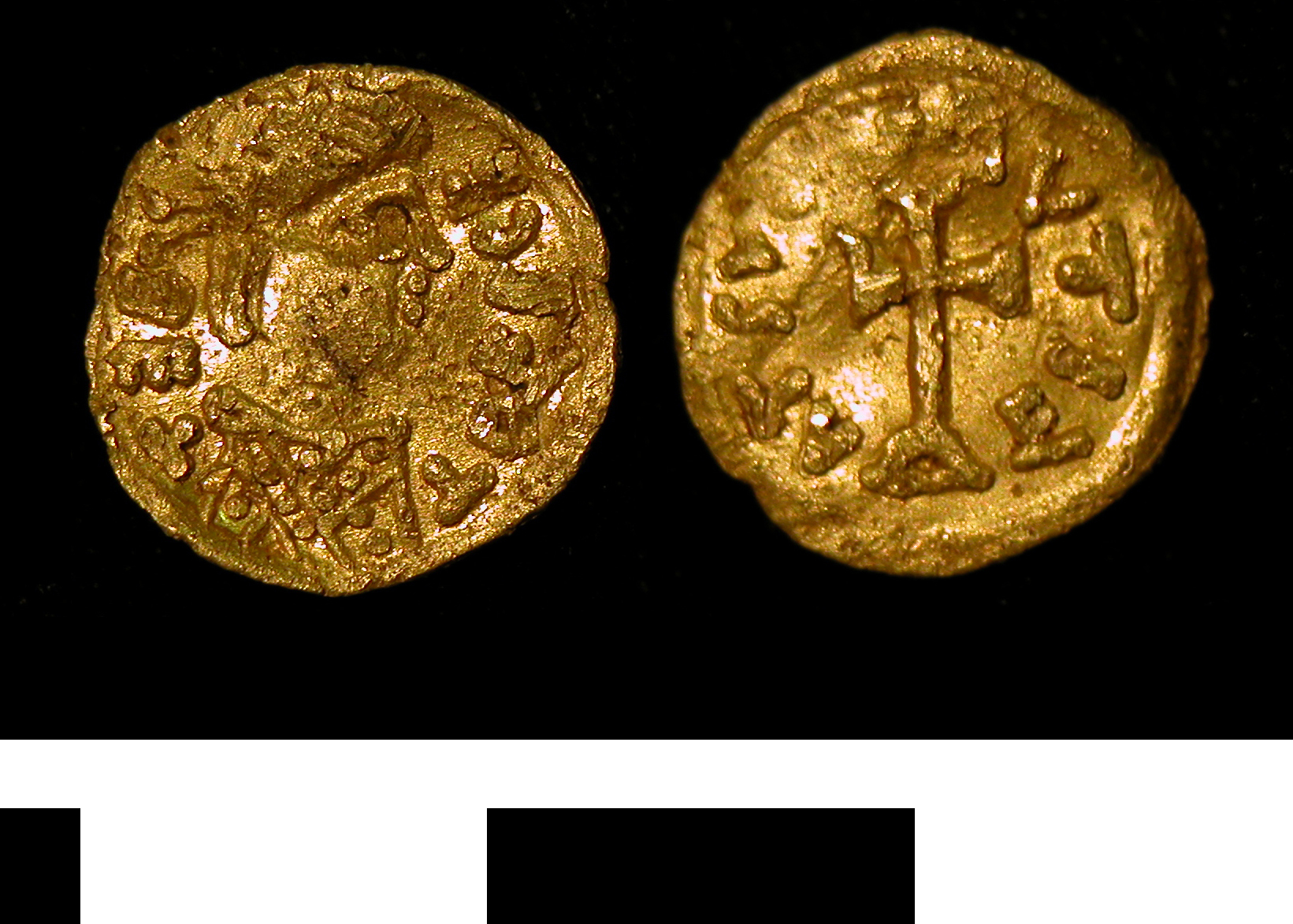
An early Medieval gold coin, dating from c. 500 – c. 680, found at Cliffe in 2007

Clovesho, or Clofeshoch, was an ancient Saxon town, in Mercia and near London, where the Anglo-Saxon Church is recorded as holding the important Councils of Clovesho between 742 and 825. These had representation from the archbishopric of Canterbury and the whole English church south of the Humber. The location of Cloveshoo has never been successfully identified, but in the 18th century Cliffe was thought to be one possible location.

== 1200–1900 ==
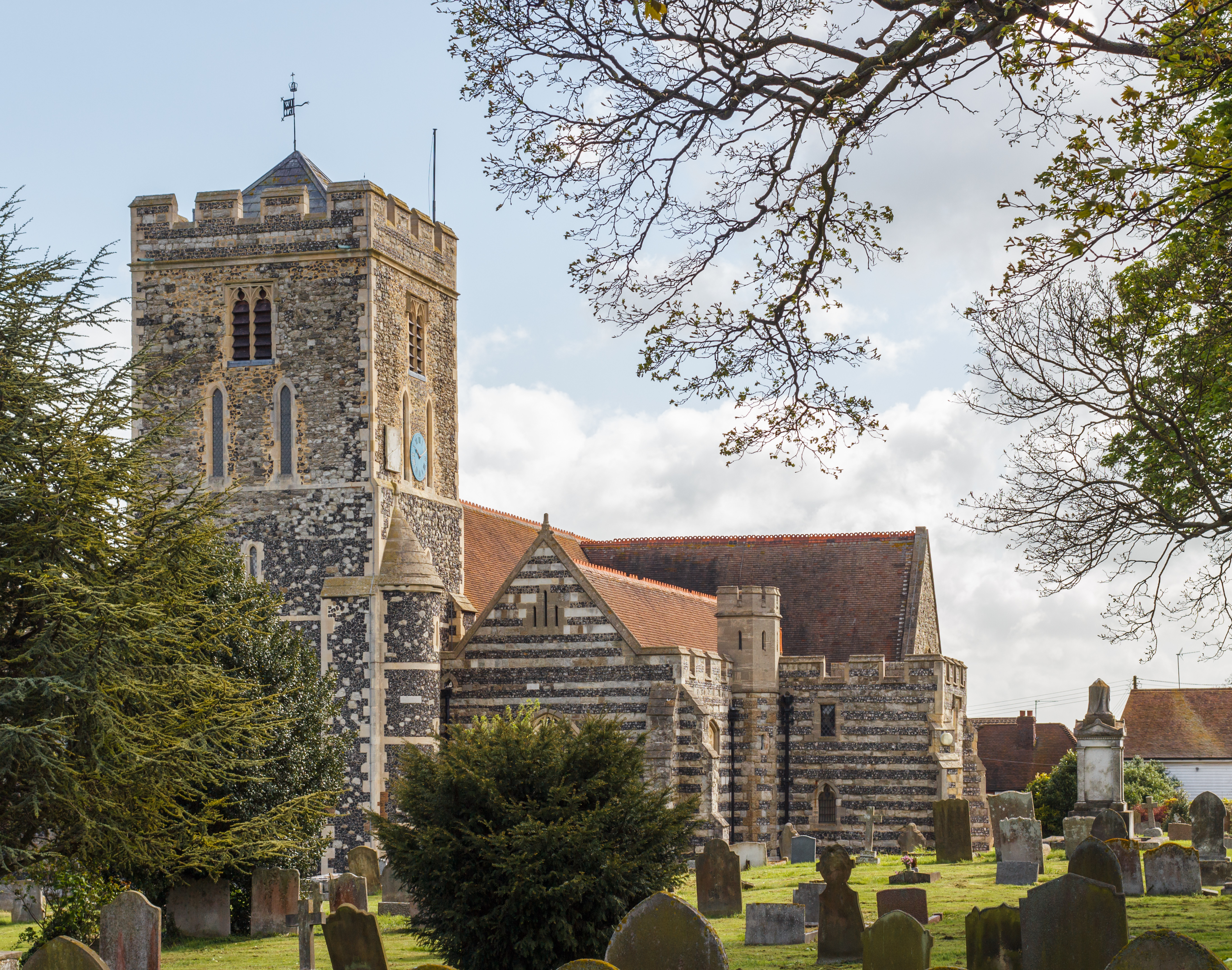
St Helen's Church in May 2015

The Grade I listed St Helen's Church at Cliffe was built about 1260 and was constructed in the local style of alternating layers of Kent ragstone and squared black flint. It is one of the largest parish churches in Kent, and the only one dedicated to St Helen, the size of the church revealing its past importance. It contains wall paintings of the martyrdom of St. Edmund, a Jacobean pulpit, and fine stone carvings.

Above the porch is a muniments room containing important historical documents.

During the 14th century Cliffe was the site of a farm owned by the monks of Christ's Church, Canterbury, when the village had a population of about 3,000. In the late Middle Ages the village of Cliffe supported a port, which thrived until a disastrous fire in 1520 stifled its growth, marking a period of decline, accentuated by the silting of the marshes of the Thames Estuary. Cliffe-at-Hoo was still considered a town in the 16th century, but by the middle of the 19th century the population had slumped to about 900.

In 1824, construction of the Thames and Medway Canal was begun, providing work for able-bodied villagers and other labourers who came to the area, increasing the population again. However, the canal project was a short-lived enterprise, superseded by the development of the railways, although the canal route, including the Higham and Strood tunnel (2.25 miles in length, in two sections) was used by South Eastern Railway from 1845, bringing a branch line to Cliffe in 1882.

== Henry Pye ==
Even in 1895 the number of people contracting malaria was high but casualties began to decrease sharply after the farmer, Henry Pye, came to the area and systematically began the drainage of the farmland and marshes, thus eliminating the carrier of the fever. He drained such a large area of the marsh and so improved the grazing pastures that he was called 'King of the Hundreds'.

Henry Pye was an innovator in farming practices promoting the use of Aveling and Porter steam engines, locally built in Rochester, for use in ploughing and threshing. In 1878, with other farmers Pye met with the South Eastern Railway Company and petitioned for a railway to be built, resulting in the establishment of the 'Hundred of Hoo Railway Company'. The first part of the line was opened in March 1882, running from Cliffe to Sharnal Street.

== Victorian Cliffe ==
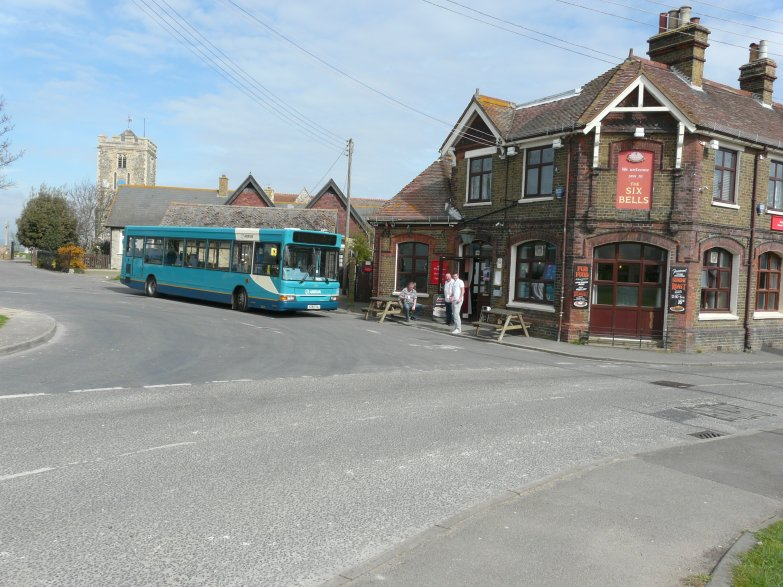
Arriva Medway Towns Plaxton Pointer 2 bodied Dennis Dart SLF outside the Six Bells pub in April 2014

The rise of the Kent cement industry brought a new prosperity to the ancient settlement during the Victorian era.

Alfred Francis (second son of Charles), with his son, established the firm of Francis and Co. at the Nine Elms office at Vauxhall, London, and then built the cement works at Cliffe in about 1860. Francis and Co instituted the Nine Elms cement works. These works were built on Cliffe marsh, to the west of the village where the chalk cliffs came almost to within a mile of the River Thames. The area also proved a useful source of clay.

Alfred Francis died in 1871, but in partnership his son continued to produce "Portland, Roman, Medina and Parian cement, Portland stucco and Plaster of Paris", also shipping chalk, flints and fire bricks, from the site.

The riverside location provided ease of transport and wharves were duly built at the mouth of Cliffe creek. A canal was constructed from the works, which gave its name to a tavern built nearby, now long demolished but remembered as the Canal Tavern.

1870–71 saw further developments to the cement works, which were rebuilt and extended, with an elaborate tramway added. Methods of extracting the chalk were basic, involving the labourer being suspended by a rope (around his waist) secured at the cliff top, from which position he would hack out the chalk, so that it fell to the ground below to be collected in a waiting railway wagon.

Further to the north of the Francis and Company works near the river, an explosive works (Curtis and Harvey) opened in 1901. Over the factory's 20-year history, 16 people were to lose their lives in explosions.

Francis and Company was taken over about 1900 by the British Portland Cement Company, but after the Great War the cement works began to decline, and was finally phased out in 1920–21.

By 1901 the population of Cliffe exceeded 3,000.

== Industrial sites ==
=== Alpha Cement ===
The Alpha Cement works began near the Francis works in 1910 as part of the Thames Portland Cement Company. It stood about a mile from the river and included a Goshead aerial cableway, which ran alongside the road constructed by the soldiers of Cliffe Fort, then disused. Alpha continued after the closure of the Francis works, which it took over in 1934. With this amalgamation an additional railway was added in 1935 to replace the cableway, linking the works with the quayside next to the fort.

The Alpha site, however, became exhausted by 1950, and further digging led to extensive flooding, as quarrying exceeded the depth of the water table. These quarries, still flooded, offer havens for wildlife, and are among the few surviving that have not been used for rubbish infill or otherwise developed.

A second quarry was begun to the north of Salt Lane, which is still the main access road to Cliffe from the cement works area, on the very edge of the marshes.

By the late 1950s the cement industry in the area was owned by the APCM, which had added a further railway line to the Hundred of Hoo railway, giving the cement manufacturers direct access to the main railway network. The works at Cliffe shut on 1 April 1970, with no further space available for quarrying, but the APCM recreation ground in the centre of the village has remained a valuable open space, with pitches for football, cricket, tennis and bowls.

In 1970 the cement industry was replaced by the Marinex gravel company, whose fleet of ships dredged gravel from the Thames Estuary.

The chalk quarry to the south side of Salt Lane is now a wildfowl reserve. In addition, it offers fishing and diving. The water is around fifty to sixty feet deep in parts and divers explore the bed of the old quarry and other underwater features.

=== Burmah Total oil refinery ===
Between 1971 and 1981 the Burmah-Total oil company planned to build an oil refinery on Cliffe marshes. However, the oil crises of 1973-4 and 1979-81 made the project uneconomic.

On 23 August 1971 Burmah Total Refineries Trust Limited (a joint venture between Total Oil Refineries (G.B.) Limited and Burmah Oil Refineries Limited) applied for planning permission for the construction of an oil refinery, jetty, pipelines and a distribution terminal at Cliffe in Kent. The facilities were to comprise:

- an oil refinery and deep-water jetty on 360 acres (146 ha) of land at Cliffe marshes (51.4383°N 0.4833°E), this was an L-shaped site 2.0 km east-to-west and 0.9 km north-to-south at its widest point,
- the construction of a road and rail loading terminal facility at Hoo Junction on the North Kent railway line (51.4417°N 0.4500°E),
- pipelines between the sites of the refinery and the terminal.

The estimated construction cost was £60 million. The application was considered by Strood Rural District Council and on 2 November 1971 by Kent County Council. Planning consent was approved subject to the Secretary of State for the Environment, Peter Walker, indicating the project was in the national interest. Walker 'called in' the application and a public inquiry, chaired by H.M.A. Stedham, was held at Cliffe Village Hall for four weeks from 11 April 1972. The inspector found 'no serious objections to the refinery on ground of pollution, noise, navigational safety or agriculture'. There were however concerns about it impact on an un-spoilt coastal area and the inadequacy of local roads. The inspector was not satisfied that the national interest justified the approval and recommended refusal. However, the Secretary of State, by then Geoffrey Rippon, considered that 'it is in the national interest for additional refinery capacity to be made available to meet expected requirements in south-east England'. One condition was there should only be a single chimney designed to discharge flue gases at a minimum height of 120 metres. Departmental draft files indicate that the Secretary of State granted outline planning permission in November 1973. On 15 January 1974 Burmah Total Refineries Trust Limited wrote to the Department of the Environment complaining that the project had then been delayed two and a half years and had entailed considerable expense in renewal of land options and escalation of project costs. They believed that 'an immediate decision is now fairly due to us'. Nevertheless, as a result of the 1973 oil crisis no further development was undertaken.

The project was revived in 1981 when an inspector from the Department of the Environment granted planning permission for the refinery. This was despite local objections at a public inquiry. However, the project was not developed any further by Burmah Total, likely to have been a consequence of the Iranian revolution and the associated oil price increases.

== Cliffe Rectory ==
Old Cliffe Rectory is some two miles (3.2 km) inland from St Helen's Church, supposedly to preserve its inhabitants from the malaria on the marshes. It has housed two chancellors of the exchequer, two archbishops, three deans and 11 archdeacons. Nicholas Heath, Bishop of Rochester and Bishop of Worcester also lived at the rectory. The "living" at Cliffe in the 17th century was described as "one of the prizes of the church".

Susanna, the daughter of Samuel Annesley, who married the Reverend Samuel Wesley, father of John Wesley, founder of the Wesleyans, also lived at Cliffe Rectory.

The rector of the rich living of Cliffe from April 1815 was Charles Burney the younger (1757–1817), son of the music historian Charles Burney, and brother of the novelist Frances Burney and the naval explorer James Burney.

The new rectory is within sight of the church.

== Cliffe Churchyard ==
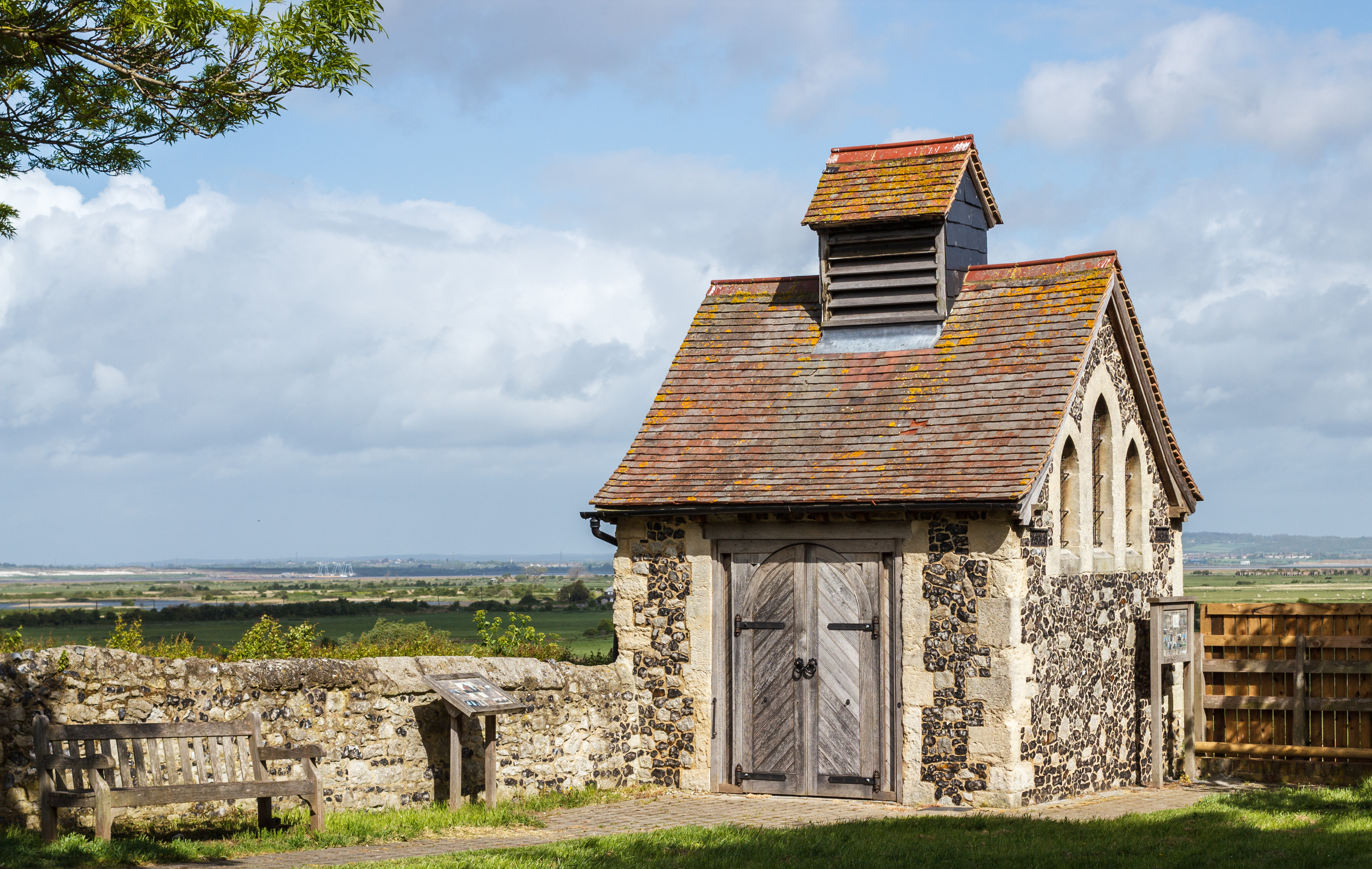
Charnel House in May 2015.

In the corner of the church graveyard is a Grade II listed Charnel House that was used to store bodies dragged out of the River Thames estuary, thought to have been erected in the mid-19th century.

== Rye Farm ==
The Grade II listed barn at Rye Farm, in Common Lane, Cliffe dates from the 1570s. It is described as a 16th-century Grade II barn "with archaic details". Beneath its present asbestos roof is a timber-framed three-bay barn with weatherboarded walls and a traditional hipped roof. It includes an ancient waggon porch.

== Cliffe Fort ==
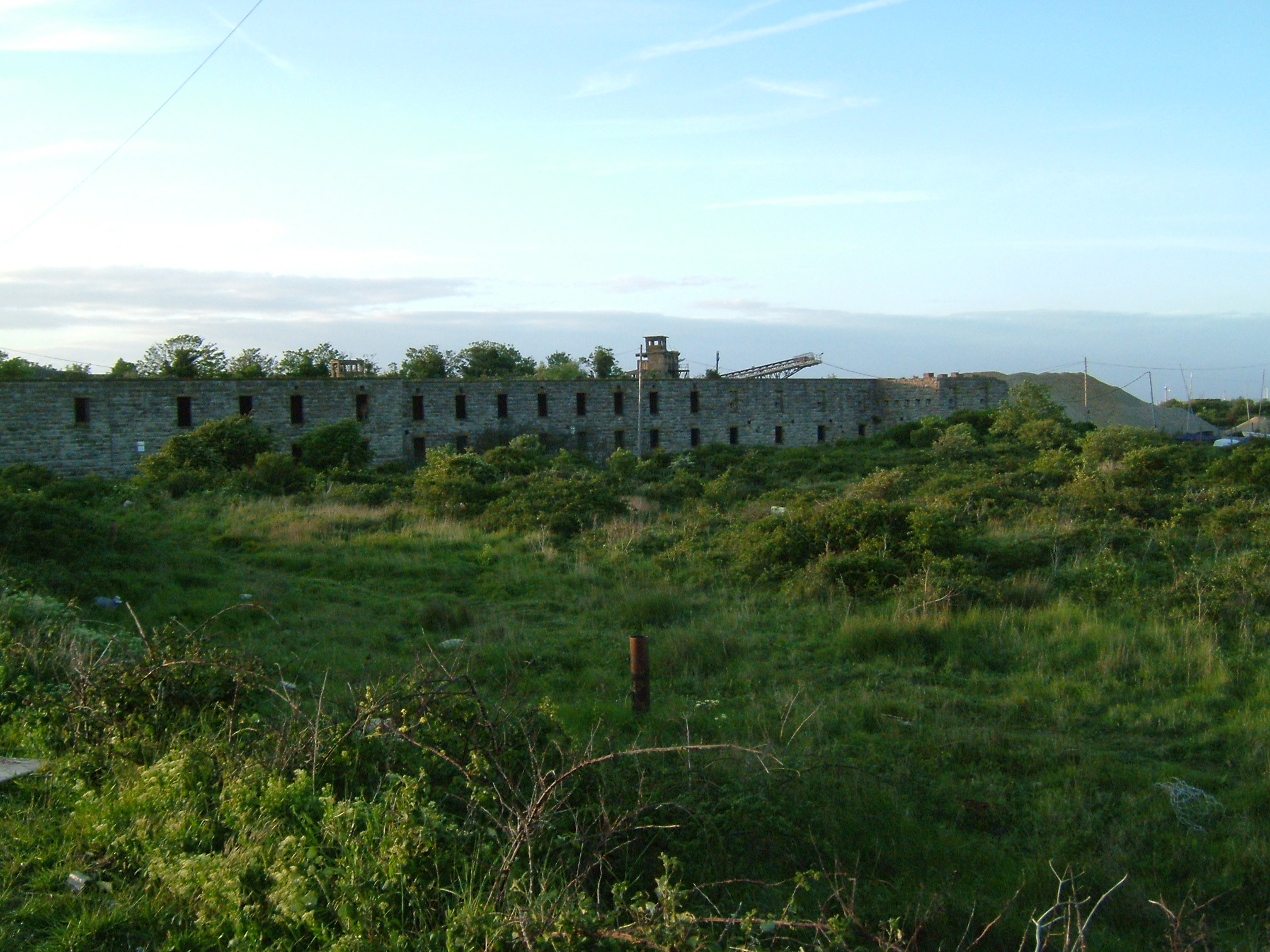
Cliffe Fort in 2007

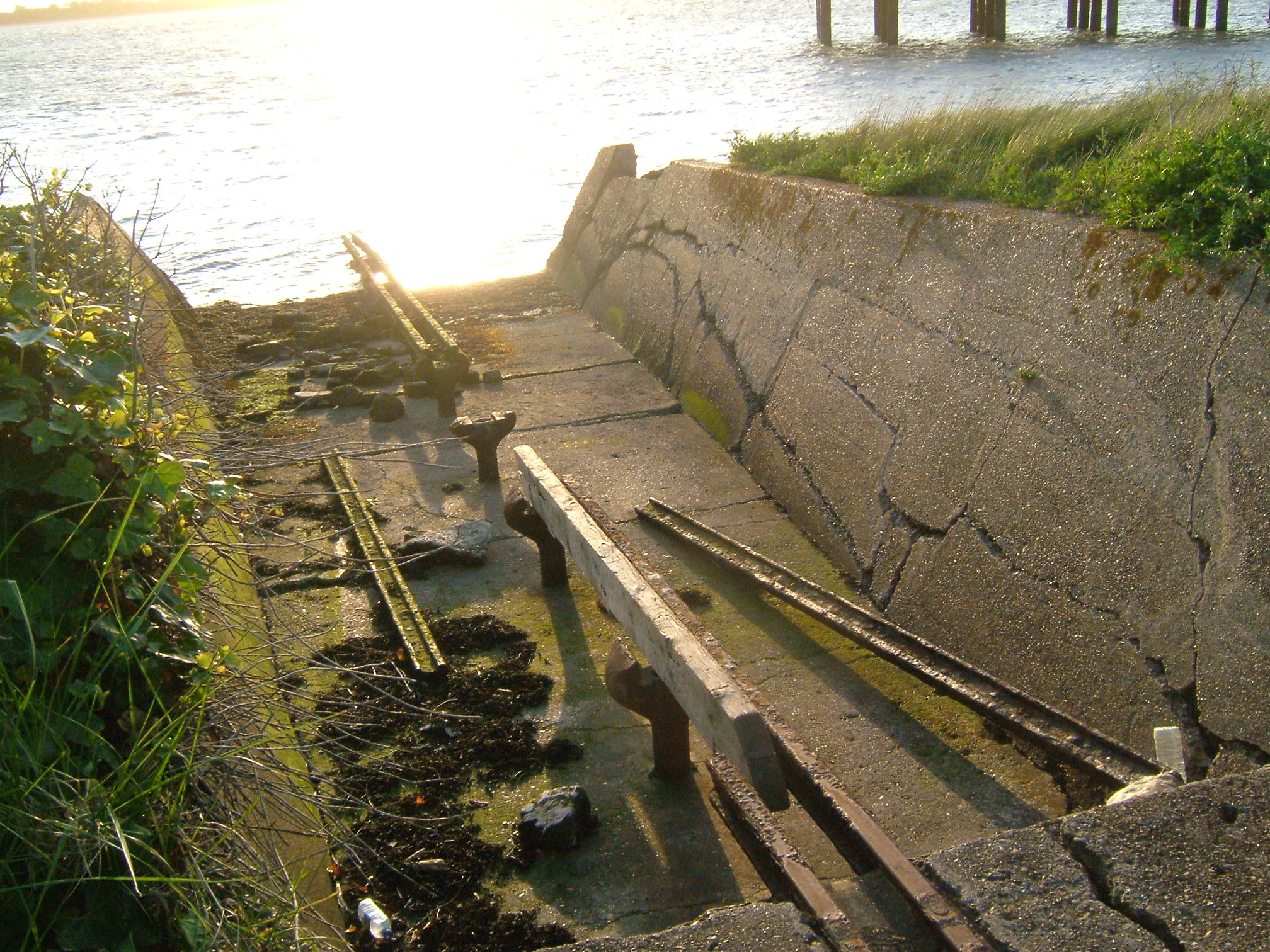
Brennan torpedo tracks at Cliffe Fort

Cliffe Fort is a Royal Commission fort built in the 1860s on the edge of the marshes to protect against invasion via the Thames. A Brennan Torpedo station was added in 1890, the rails of which are still visible at low water, and was used as an anti-aircraft battery in the Second World War. It is now inside a gravel extraction site and is inaccessible and very overgrown, but can be viewed from the riverside path.

== Cliffe Airport ==
In 2002 the government identified a site at Cliffe as the leading contender among potential sites for a new airport for London, as a replacement for Heathrow. In December 2003 the government decided against the Cliffe proposal on the grounds that the costs of a coastal site were too high, and there was a significant risk that the airport would not be well used.

== Hans Egede ==
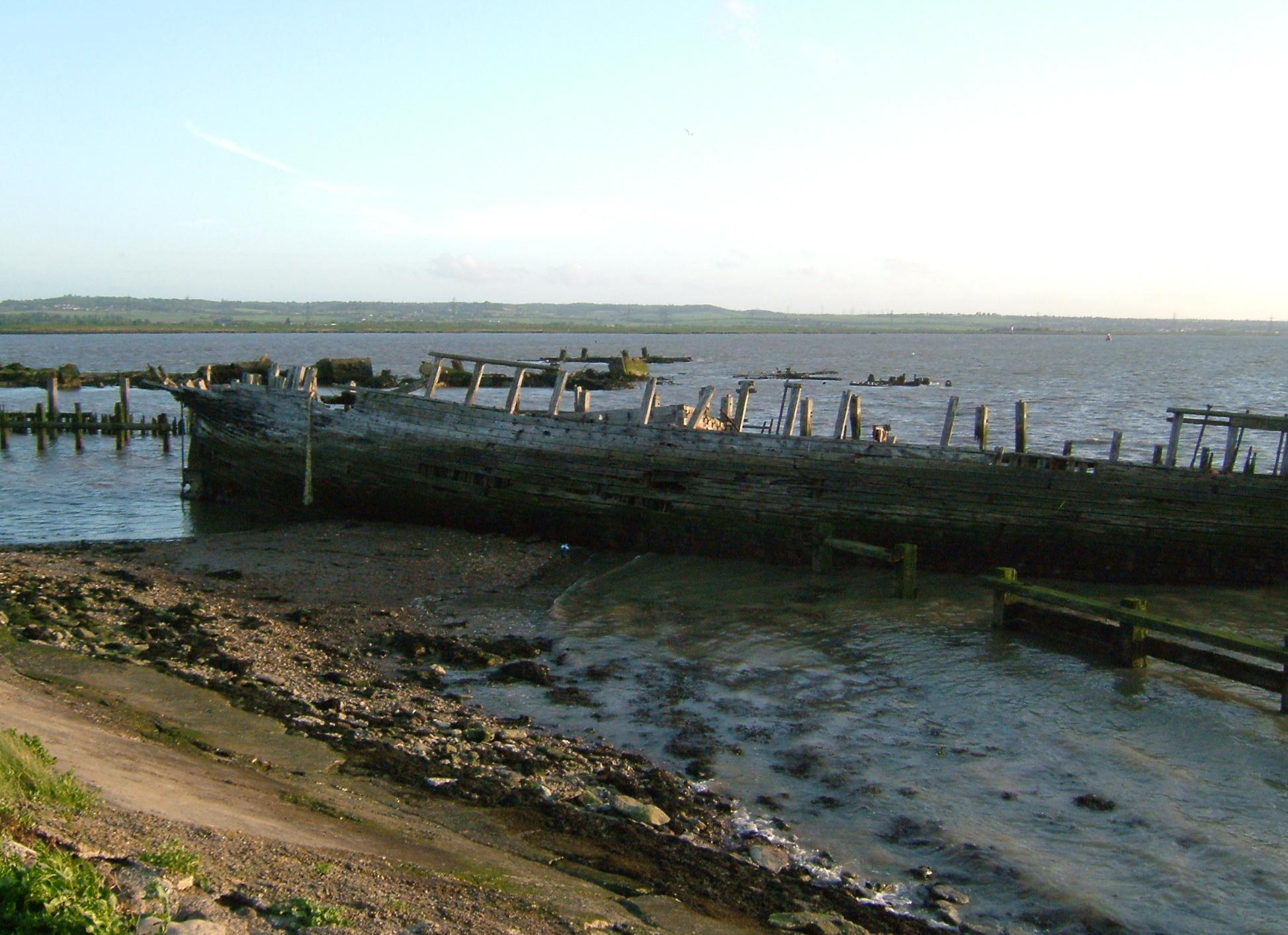
The Hans Egede in 2007

A prominent feature where the marshes meet the river for many years, the Hans Egede was a wooden, auxiliary three-masted ship, built in 1922 by J. Th. Jorgensen at Thuro, Denmark. It was reportedly damaged by fire on 21 August 1955 and towed to Dover, where the fire was extinguished.

In 1957 she passed into the ownership of the Atlas Diesel Co. and was towed out of Dover by the tug Westercock. She then spent some years in the Medway as a coal and/or grain hulk. She was then towed to Cubitt Town on the Thames. As the tug Fossa from Gravesend was towing her up Sea Reach the strain on the structure, which had become weakened over the years, proved too much, causing her to take in water and sink. After grounding on the Blyth Sands she was beached at Cliffe.

Following a succession of storms, high tides and strong winds in December 2013, a large section of the ship's hull has now broken off and lies on the shore further round from the rest of the wreckage.

== Cultural allusions ==
A row of unnamed children's graves in the churchyard spurred Charles Dickens to use it as the setting for the beginning of Great Expectations (1860–61), where Magwitch jumps out at Pip "among the graves by the side of the church porch." Other sources claim that Dickens's inspiration were graves in nearby Cooling churchyard.

Cliffe marshes stood in for the paddy fields of Vietnam in Stanley Kubrick's 1987 film Full Metal Jacket.
