= Cuxton =

Village in Kent, England

Coordinates: 51.375°N 0.450°E

- Village and civil parish
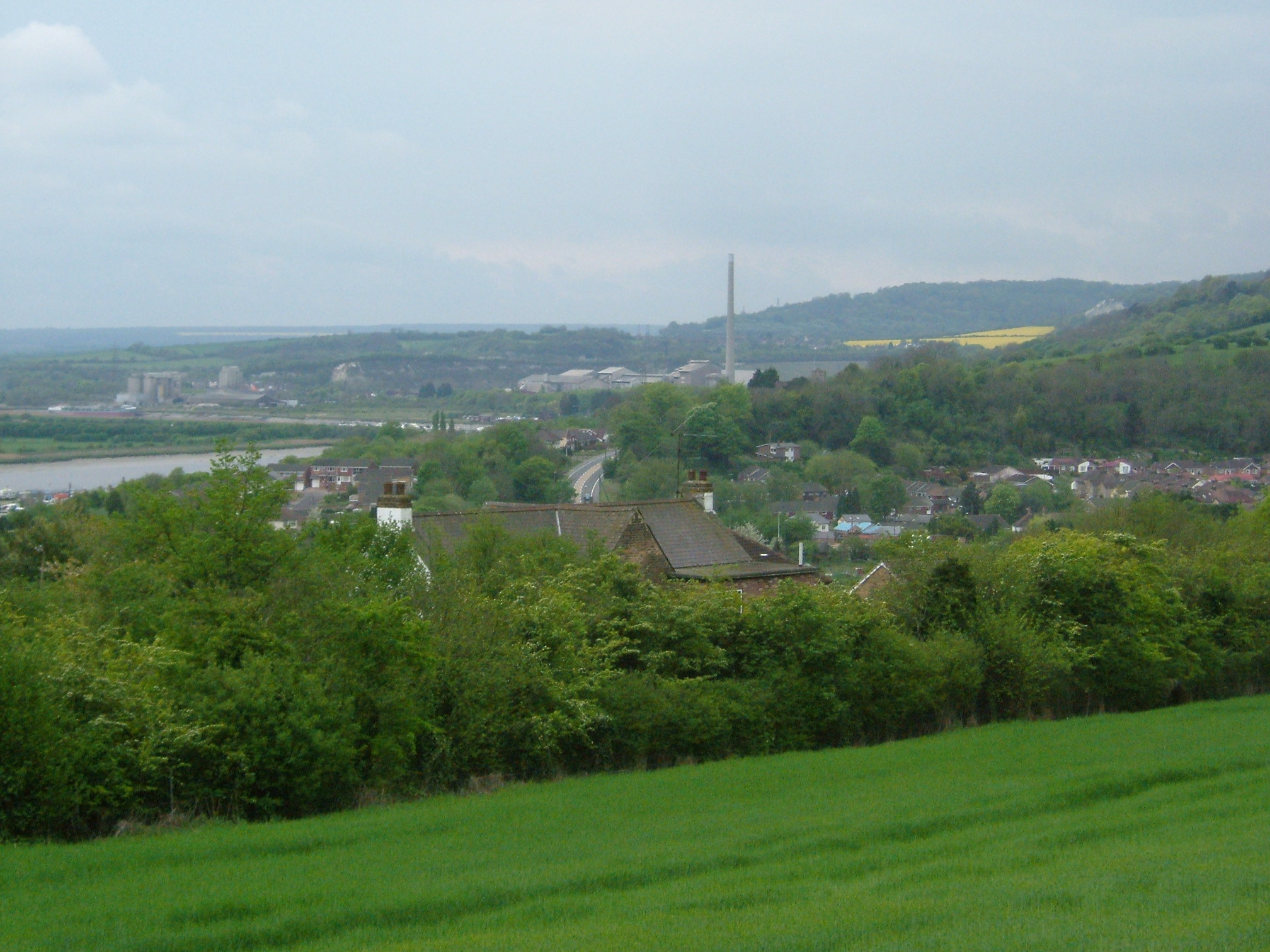
- Looking south, Cuxton seen from Ranscombe Farm. In the distance is the cement works at Halling

- Location within Kent
- Interactive map showing the parish boundary
- Population: 2,627 (2021 census)
- OS grid reference: TQ709665
- Unitary authority: Medway
- Ceremonial county: Kent
- Region: South East
- Country: England
- Sovereign state: United Kingdom
- Post town: Rochester
- Postcode district: ME2
- Dialling code: 01634
- Police: Kent
- Fire: Kent
- Ambulance: South East Coast
- UK Parliament: Rochester and Strood

Cuxton is a village and civil parish in the unitary authority of Medway, Kent in south-east England. It lies on the left bank of the River Medway in the North Downs. It is served by the A228, and Cuxton railway station on the Medway Valley line between Strood and Maidstone. A low valley leads up from the river to the hamlet of Lower Bush.

== History ==
Archaeological evidence suggest the first human occupation was around 200,000 years ago. A hoard of 196 handaxes from the Acheulian era was excavated in 1962. This is now displayed in the British Museum. The name is believed to have developed from "Cucula's stone".

The remains of a Roman villa were found under the church yard. The Saxons occupied the town and it became known as Cuckelstane. The church and parish was given by Æthelwulf, King of the West Saxons to the Cathedral church of St. Andrew, Rochester. The church of Saint Michael and All Angels contains much Norman architecture, and is unusual as it lies on a southeast–northwest axis. This gave rise to the rhyme, 'he that would see a church miswent / let him go to Cucklestane in Kent.'

In Tudor times the principal house in the town was Whorne's Place, erected on the river by Sir William Whorne, Lord Mayor of London in 1487. This was later owned by the Leveson family and most notably Sir John Leveson who was Lord Deputy Lieutenant of Kent. This was taken over by the Mashams, strong royalists who moved on to the Mote in Maidstone. The mansion was demolished in 1782 and only an outlying granary, now a house still bearing the name Whorne's Place, survives in 2011.

The only other manor in Tudor Cuxton was that of Beresse or Beresh, now known as Bush. It doesn't survive.

In 1610, William Laud was rector of Cuxton; he later became Archbishop of Canterbury under Charles I and was executed by the puritans in 1645 because of his strong royalist loyalties.

In Upper Bush there are four houses dating from 14th century and a Tudor Kentish yeoman's house. A tin chapel from Cuxton was dismantled and re-erected at the Museum of Kent Life, Sandling.

In August 2015, the National Crime Agency intercepted a gang smuggling guns into the UK near Cuxton Marina, describing the seizure of weapons and ammunition as the largest of its kind in the UK.

== Governance ==
Cuxton is part of the electoral ward called Cuxton and Halling. The population of this ward at the 2021 census was 6,602.

== Demographics ==
At the 2021 census, Cuxton had a population of 2,627 people in 1,081 households.

Census population of Cuxton parish
Census	Population	Female	Male	Households	Source
2001	2,570	1,311	1,259	1,007	
2011	2,627	1,353	1,274	1,060	
2021	2,627	1,342	1,285	1,081	

== Economy ==
Historically, the local economy included agriculture, particularly market gardening and orchards during the 19th century, when contemporary accounts describe residents operating market gardens surrounded by fruit-growing land.

Brickmaking later became a major industry from the mid-1800s until the 1970s, with bricks produced in the village transported along the River Medway to London, including use in prominent buildings such as the British Museum. In the 20th century, a large chalk quarry worked by Rugby Cement supplied raw material for cement production, although the quarry has since been closed and landscaped.

== Transport ==
Cuxton is served by both road and rail. The A228 road runs through the village, providing direct connections to the nearby M2 and M20 motorways. Rail service is provided by Cuxton railway station on the Medway Valley line (between Strood and Maidstone). All trains serving Cuxton station are operated by Southeastern.

Cuxton also has bus connections. For example, Nu-Venture's route 151 runs daily (including weekends) through Cuxton, linking it with Strood, Snodland, West Malling and Kings Hill.

The village lies on the River Medway. Cuxton is on the left bank of the Medway, and Cuxton Marina on the river offers moorings and boat services for leisure craft.

Cuxton is also connected by regional walking and cycling routes. A Medway cycling route (part of National Cycle Network Route 1) passes through the village – a local cycle map notes the route goes “through Lower Bush and into Cuxton with its village shops and train station”, linking Cobham to Rochester. In addition, Ranscombe Farm in Cuxton straddles the North Downs Way long-distance footpath, giving hikers a high-level trail across the North Downs above the village.

== Education ==
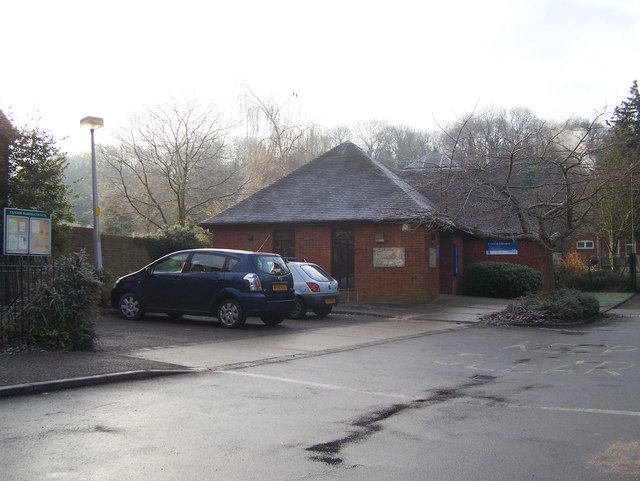
Cuxton Library in 2008

In Cuxton, education is centred on two primary schools that form part of the Academy of Cuxton Schools. Cuxton Community Infant School provides education for children aged 4–7, while Cuxton Community Junior School serves pupils aged 7–11; both are located on Bush Road.

The village is also served by Cuxton Library. The library is owned by Medway Council.

== Ranscombe Farm ==
Ranscombe Farm is a plantlife nature reserve, country park and working farm. Part of the site is included in the Cobham Woods Site of Special Scientific Interest, and the whole farm is within the Kent Downs Area of Outstanding Natural Beauty.

== Notable people ==
- Steve Brown (born 1990), content creator and racing driver

== See also ==
- Listed buildings in Cuxton
