= Geoffrey Longfield =

English cricketer and Royal Air Force officer

Personal information
- Full name: Geoffrey Phelps Longfield
- Born: 4 December 1909; High Halstow, Kent, England
- Died: 25 February 1943 (aged 33); Rennes, Brittany, German-occupied France
- Batting: Right-handed
- Bowling: Right-arm (unknown style)
- Relatives: Tom Longfield (brother)

Career statistics
| Competition | First-class |
|---|---|
| Matches | 2 |
| Runs scored | 36 |
| Batting average | 9.00 |
| 100s/50s | –/– |
| Top score | 26 |
| Balls bowled | 210 |
| Wickets | 2 |
| Bowling average | 69.00 |
| 5 wickets in innings | – |
| 10 wickets in match | – |
| Best bowling | 2/51 |
| Catches/stumpings | –/– |
- Source: Cricinfo, 20 March 2019

Geoffrey Phelps Longfield (4 December 1909 – 25 February 1943) was an English first-class cricketer and Royal Air Force officer. Enlisting in the Royal Air Force in 1929, he played first-class cricket for the Royal Air Force cricket team in the early 1930s, before later serving in the Second World War with the Royal Air Force Volunteer Reserve, during which he was killed on a mission while commanding 105 Squadron.

== Life and military career ==
The son of the Reverend Thomas William Longfield, he was born at High Halstow in Kent, and was educated at Aldenham School. Upon leaving Aldenham, Longfield enlisted in the Royal Air Force as a pilot officer in February 1929, with confirmation in the rank in March 1930. He was promoted to the rank of flying officer in August 1930. He made his debut in first-class cricket for the Royal Air Force cricket team against the Army at The Oval in 1931; he claimed both of his first-class wickets in this match, dismissing Alexander Wilkinson and Adrian Gore. He made a second first-class appearance the following year in a repeat of the 1931 fixture.

He was transferred to the class A reserve in February 1934, with a further transfer to the C class in December 1934. He was transferred back to the A class in December 1935, He was promoted to the rank of flight lieutenant in January 1938. Serving during the Second World War, Longfield was promoted to the rank of squadron leader in December 1940.

He was promoted to the temporary rank of wing commander in September 1942, with seniority antedated to March 1942, and was placed in command of 105 Squadron, which had the distinction of being the first squadron to fly the Mosquito fighter-bomber. On 26 February 1943, he took off from RAF Marham for an attack on Rennes in occupied France. While engaging the target, Longfield made a navigational error and collided with another Mosquito in the squadron. Longfield and his navigator, Flight Lieutenant Ralph Frederick Mills, were both killed, along with the crew of the Mosquito he collided with, piloted by Flight Officer Spencer Griffith Kimmel of the Royal Canadian Air Force. His replacement as commanding officer of 105 Squadron, Wing Commander John William Deacon, was killed the following day in a training accident in Norfolk.

Longfield was buried at Rennes Eastern Communal Cemetery. His brother, Tom Longfield, was also a first-class cricketer.
