= Cliffe Woods =

Village in Kent, England

Coordinates: 51.435°N 0.4956°E

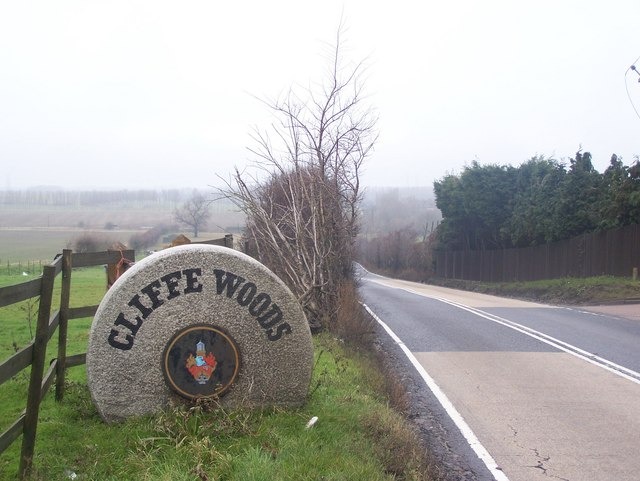

- Location within Kent
- Population: 2,662 (2011 census)
- OS grid reference: TQ734736
- Unitary authority: Medway
- Ceremonial county: Kent
- Region: South East
- Country: England
- Sovereign state: United Kingdom
- Post town: Rochester
- Postcode district: ME3
- Police: Kent
- Fire: Kent
- Ambulance: South East Coast
- UK Parliament: Rochester and Strood

Cliffe Woods is a small village on the Hoo Peninsula in the unitary authority of Medway in South East England. It was, until 1998, part of Kent and is still ceremonially associated via the Lieutenancies Act. It forms part of the parish of Cliffe and Cliffe Woods.

== History ==
Cliffe Woods is a village that has been built in an ancient area of woodland. Its roots are closely tied to the surrounding area which stretch back to pre-Roman times. At the time of the Norman conquest of England Cliffe Woods was part of the Hundred of Shamwell. Of the adjacent listed Domesday Book settlements, Cooling, Oakleigh and Haven, only Cooling had any recorded woodland resources in its inventory. The woods were used for the pannage of pigs; ten pigs a year were paid to Wulfwin the local Anglo Saxon Lord. His Germanic name means wolf-friend. The Anglo Saxon overlord was Leofwine Godwinson who was the brother of King Harold.

According to Edward Hasted (1732–1812), the father of Kent history, ‘Southward of the common field, on the road to Rochester, the land rises to the hilly country, a poor clayey soil likewise, where is the manor of Mortimer's, at the southern boundary of this parish. The manor was in the possession of the great family of Mortimer, Hugh de Mortimer was in possession of the manor in the reign of Edward I of England' (1239–1307).

The naming of Mortimer's Wood and subsequently Mortimer's Avenue can be associated from its connection to the old manor. Some other road names in the eastern part of Cliffe Woods are also historically connected to the manor. For example, Englefield Crescent is named after Thomas Englefield (1455–1514) the Speaker of the House of Commons in the reign of Henry VII of England; he also owned Mortimer's.

Burye-Court Manor (associated with Berry Court Wood) was granted to George Brooke, 9th Baron Cobham in 1541 by Henry VIII of England. His grandson Henry Brooke, 11th Baron Cobham lost the manor in 1603 after being convicted of treason against James VI and I, which resulted in his imprisonment in the Tower of London.

Tithe records from the middle of the 19th century show that 36 acres of Mortimer's Wood were owned by the trustees of the 5th Earl of Darnley. Robert Turberville Bingham of Rochester owned 23 acres of Lady's Close and Ratly Hill Wood, the name is associated with Bingham Roughs. Based at Cobham Hall the Darnley's were major landowners in the area, the Cobham Estate fell into decline at the beginning of the 20th century. There were no buildings in Cliffe Woods in 1870. The different areas of woodland were named (from west to east) Mortimers Wood, Ladies Close, Ratly Hills Woods, Bingham Roughs, Berry Court Wood, Great Chattenden Wood, Ash Wood, Stone House Wood and Round Top Wood near Chattenden. Ladies Close is today associated with Ladyclose Avenue. Cooling Common (now Merry Boys Road) referred to common land and in 1797 Hasted referred to the common field which indicates not all land had been enclosed by that time.

In 1870, the adjacent buildings to Cliffe Woods were;

- Mortimer's Farm House, the Grade II Listed 17th century farmhouse.
- The Three Merry Boys Pub at Cooling Common, the first landlord was John Simmons in 1855, it closed its doors in 1958.
- The farmsteads of Lee Green and Lillechurch, its history stretching back a thousand years.

After World War I (1914–1918) the area now covered by the newer housing was divided into woodland plots and called the Rochester Park Estate. The Rochester Park and Garden Suburb was a ‘plotland’ settlement, part of a wider movement at the time of unregulated development. W H Talbot parcelled up and sold plots between 1918 and 1939. This resulted in a haphazard layout of small buildings and chalets served by a network of unmade tracks; with poor water, electricity and sewer connections. Two tracks were named Milton and Tennyson Avenues after the poets John Milton and Alfred Lord Tennyson. The plots here were mainly used for summer leisure purposes. The author Lena Kennedy (1914–1986) describes in her autobiography 'Away to the Woods' her experiences of living on a woodland plot. Inspired by Charles Dickens (1812–1870), who lived nearby at Higham, she based some of her romantic historical novels in the area. A blue plaque is sited on her plotland shack in View Road.

Town Road, Mortimers Avenue and Ladyclose Avenue developed a permanent population before World War II (1939–1945). Pre-war chalet bungalows were built. They had electricity (1936), running water and heating and hot water provided by log stoves. Sewage was by septic tank until the main drainage was constructed by 1963.

During World War II many pillboxes were constructed as part of the home defences. A Stop Line was constructed in 1940 across the Hoo Peninsula from the Medway to the Thames which ran through Cliffe Woods. Being on the flight path to London many bombs fell and their craters are still evident in the landscape. On 11 November 1944 at 3.40 pm a V2 rocket fell in Ratly Hill Wood and wiped out trees in a 17-metre radius.

In the 1950s local children attended school at Cliffe or walked to Cooling Street where the school was in an old Methodist Chapel built in 1899. It was known as the chapel in the orchard. The Alpha cement factory owned by APCM provided local employment until it closed in 1970. Cement making had begun at Cliffe in 1854 in a bottle kiln. Women worked seasonally picking fruit, local growers used the railway to transport their goods to market.

The Maidstone & District bus service (service number 17) provided transport from Cliffe Woods into Cliffe and the Medway towns for provisions. Cliffe station on the Hundred of Hoo railway line (1 April 1882 to 4 December 1961) lay less than a mile north of the village. It transported passengers to Gravesend and to the seaside at Allhallows. On 10 February 1967 Strood Rural District Council made a compulsory purchase order to buy 86 acres of land to the east of Town Road. The purpose was to provide a comprehensive development by the erection of shops, community centre and dwelling houses. The building of the new community commenced in the 1970s and the park and garden suburb envisaged in the naming of the old plotland site became a reality. Today over 90% of residents own their houses. The population of Cliffe Woods at the 2011 census was 2662. in 1801 only 525 people lived in the entire parish.

== Education ==
Cliffe Woods Primary School is a 3-11 primary school, using the buildings built for the Cliffe Woods Middle School.

There is also a school for children aged 5–18 with additional needs which is called City of Rochester School.

== Local government ==
Cliffe Woods is governed by the unitary Medway Council. Its direct, day-to-day representation at the council is through three councillors, as part of the Strood Rural ward. Elections occur every four years. As at 2018 the three elected stood as Conservatives who form a majority on the Council since 2003 - they sit in the current local policies governing group.

A lower level operates, mainly as consultees in some policy areas and for minor precept expenditure, Cliffe and Cliffe Woods Civil Parish Council.
