= Fleet (Kent) =

Type of saline waterway in Kent, England

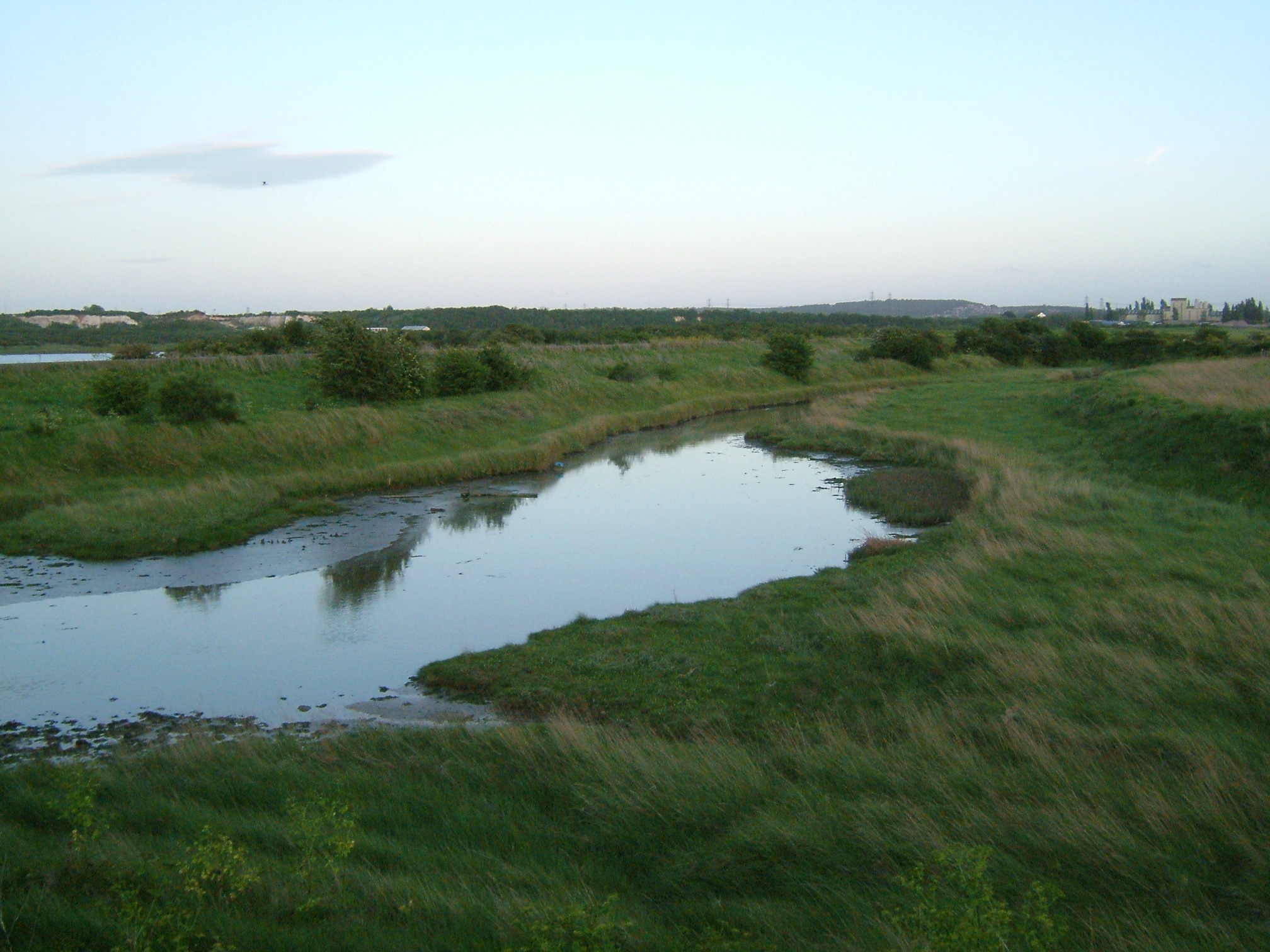
A small fleet behind the sea wall at Cliffe creek

A fleet is a saline waterway within the North Kent Marshes in Kent, England, on the Hoo Peninsula between Rochester and Gravesend and on the Isle of Sheppey. It also has the meaning creek or inlet. The word comes from the Old English Flëot 798, Fletes 1086. They are a part of a nature reserve.

In the Cliffe Marshes the most prominent are the

- Cliffe Fleet
- Hope Fleet
- Salt Fleet
- Decoy Fleet

On Sheppey the most prominent is the

- Capel Fleet.
