= High Halstow =

Village in Kent, England

Coordinates: 51.45°N 0.575°E

- The 10th-century St Margaret's Church, High Halstow, looking east

- Location within Kent
- Population: 1,807 (2011)
- OS grid reference: TQ780754
- Civil parish: High Halstow
- Unitary authority: Medway
- Ceremonial county: Kent
- Region: South East
- Country: England
- Sovereign state: United Kingdom
- Post town: ROCHESTER
- Postcode district: ME3
- Dialling code: 01634
- Police: Kent
- Fire: Kent
- Ambulance: South East Coast
- UK Parliament: Rochester and Strood

High Halstow is a village and civil parish on the Hoo Peninsula in the unitary authority of Medway in South East England. It was, until 1998, administratively part of Kent and is still ceremonially associated via the Lieutenancies Act. The parish had a population of 1,781 according to the 2001 census, increasing to 1,807 at the 2011 census.

Originally known as Hagelstowe (in Textus Roffensis), Hagelsto or Agelstow, it was named from an Old English word denoting a high, holy place. The area has been occupied by Romans, Saxons and Normans.

The village lies on the junction of the ancient roads from Hoo and Cliffe to the Isle of Grain, now a crossroads to the north of the A228 road. One of the highest points on the Hoo peninsula, at 30 to 50 metres above sea level, the modern village consolidates into a single community the four hamlets of Clinch Street, Fenn Street, Sharnal Street and High Halstow Street.

== History ==
The 10th-century Grade I listed church of St Margaret at High Halstow was mentioned in the Domesday Book of 1086, and was built on the highest point of the Hoo Peninsula, overlooking the rivers of the Thames and Medway.

In the 18th century poverty and malnutrition were widespread across the peninsula, with High Halstow no exception; adult life expectancy was then about 30 years, lessened by ague, or marsh fever, the names for malaria, which proliferated in the North Kent Marshes and waterlogged farmland, a stronghold of the mosquito. The cause of malaria was discovered in 1890, and within five years the number of people falling ill with the disease decreased sharply as farmland and marshes were drained. This task was performed in no small way by Henry Pye, after he moved to the area.

The village remained small until after the Second World War, comprising the church, a school, two shops, a pub, a wheelwright's shop, and an undertaker's, with the village being served by a single policeman. Eventually some of the older houses were demolished and replaced. Churchill Place was developed and in the area behind the church, formerly known as the Square, several modern bungalows replaced five thatched cottages. From 1952 more homes were built in the village to house Isle of Grain oil refinery employees.

Historically, the main economic activity around High Halstow has been farming, but some of the village's residents gained employment outside the village, at the Royal Naval Armaments Depot at Chattenden and Lodge Hill Military Camps and at the Medway Oil and Storage Co at Grain. Chatham Dockyard and the Short Brothers seaplane works at Rochester were also traditional employers for the whole area until they shut many years ago.

In 1956 a new school opened, the old school building being demolished along with Hill Farm to make way for additional housing. Building development has continued intermittently, including the new estates of Northwood Park and Heron Fields, development of which began in 1998.

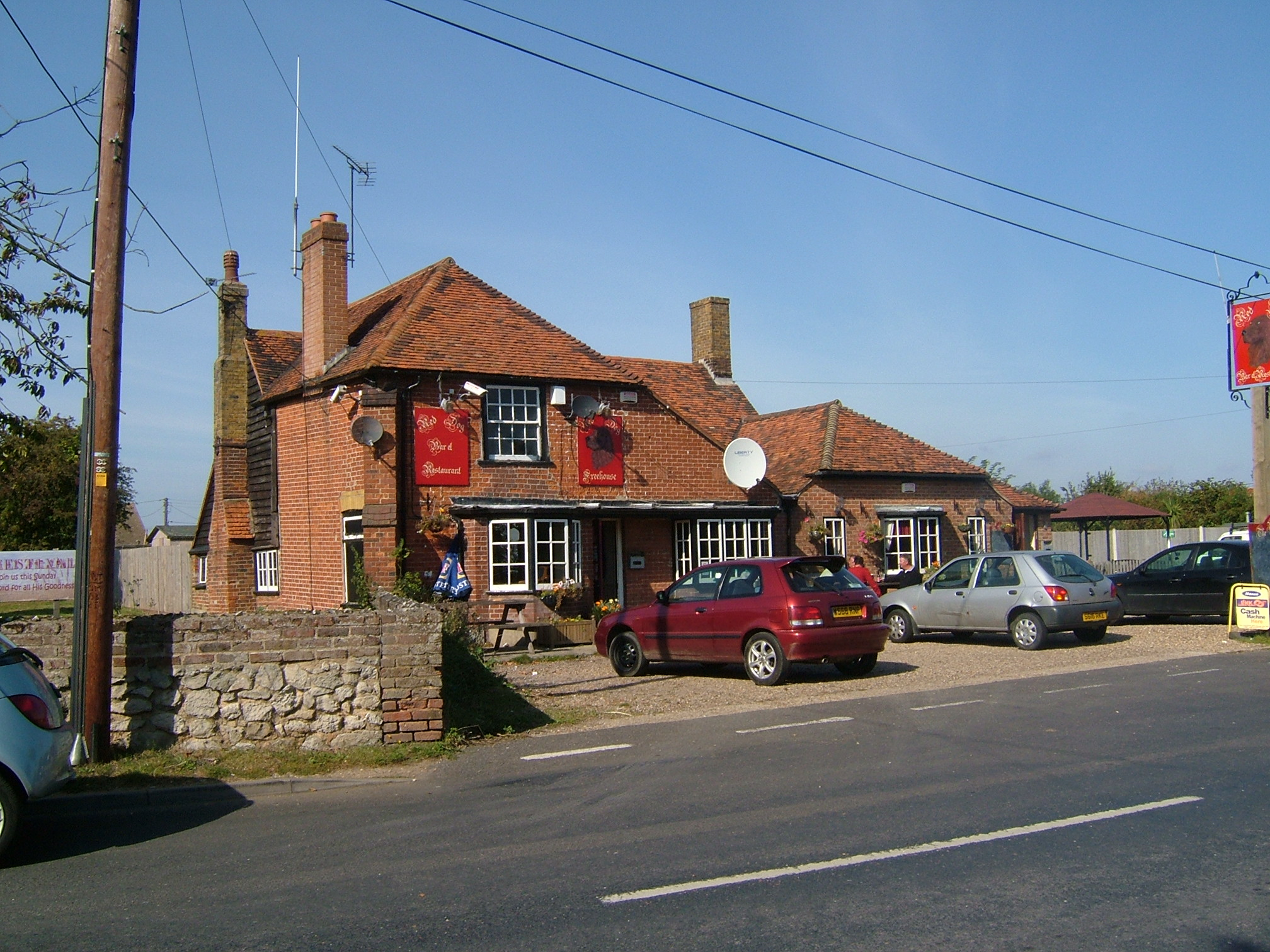
The Red Dog, High Halstow

The village still has its church, a shop and pub (the Red Dog) but has changed beyond recognition in living memory.

The village's cricket club has played in the area for almost 120 years. Ever expanding, the club now has Three Saturday sides, one Sunday side and three colts sides. They play their home matches at Rayner's Meadow, which is situated in Christmas Lane, and at the Hundred of Hoo school, Hoo.

North Kent Marsh

== Northward Hill RSPB Reserve ==
Northward Hill RSPB Reserve lies to the north of the village, between High Halstow and Cooling. It comprises 270 hectares (670 acres) of grazing marsh, woodland and farmland. The woodland forms High Halstow Nature Reserve (a local SSSI). Here is the largest heronry in Britain, where some 150–200 pairs nest. A heronry has been in the woods from at least 1947, when it was mentioned in The Hundred of Hoo by Ralph Arnold. Many other birds, such as little egrets, avocets and marsh harriers, can also be seen in the reserve. This site was scheduled for demolition under government proposals for an international London airport in connection with the Thames Gateway.

Northward Hill, was known once locally as "the Norrards". Beyond it on the marsh is a disused experimental radar station, now part of the reserve.

== Buck Hole Farmhouse ==
Buck Hole Farmhouse stands next to Northward Hill Reserve; it and another Grade II listed farmhouse Great Dalham date from the early 18th century.

== Notable people ==
- Geoffrey Longfield (1909-1943), first-class cricketer and Royal Air Force officer

== See also ==
- Lower Halstow
- Listed buildings in High Halstow
