= St Mary Hoo =

Village in Kent, England

Coordinates: 51.459°N 0.600°E

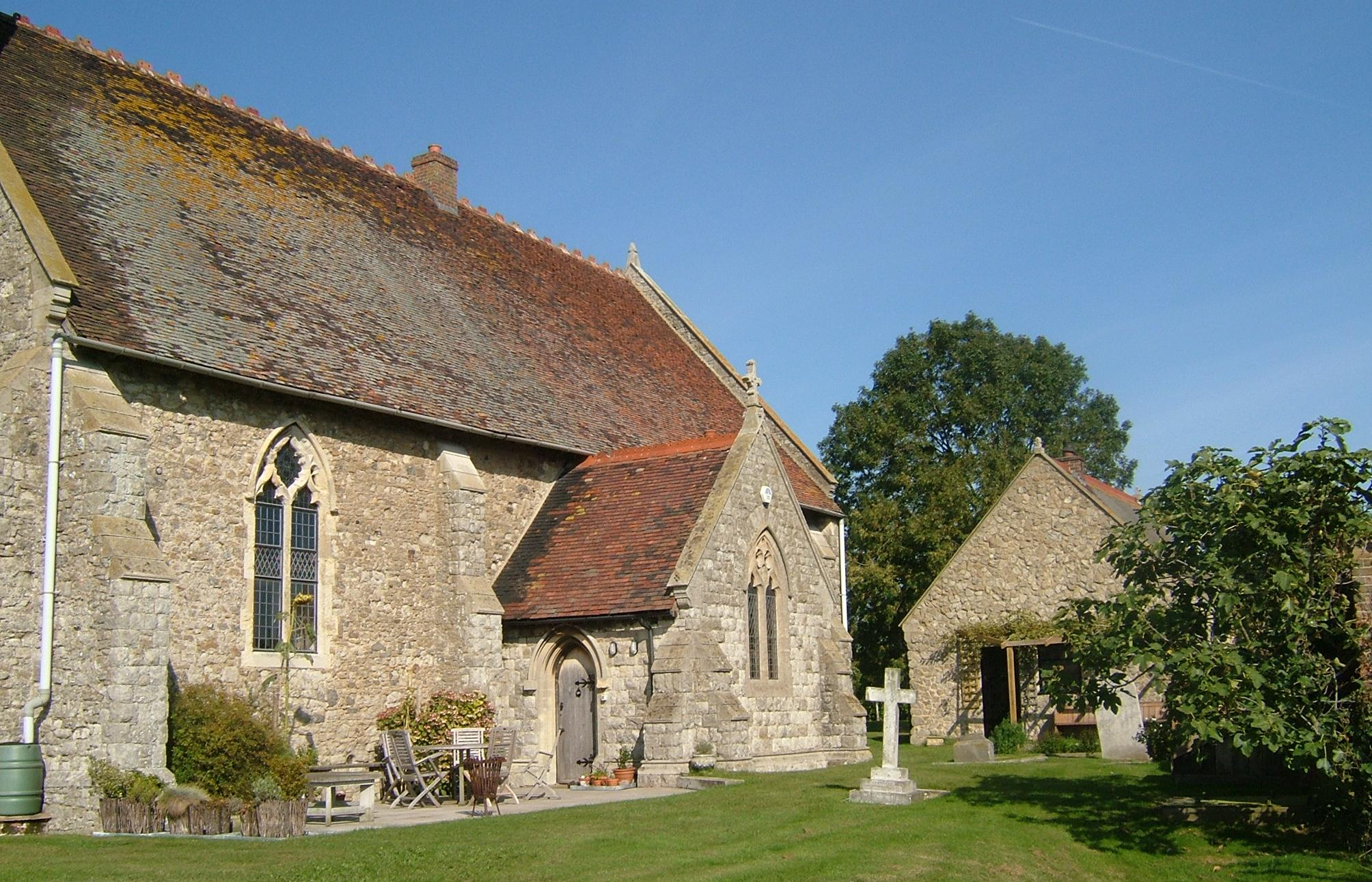
- St Mary's Church

- Location within Kent
- Population: 238 (2011)
- OS grid reference: TQ804766
- Civil parish: St Mary Hoo
- Unitary authority: Medway
- Ceremonial county: Kent
- Region: South East
- Country: England
- Sovereign state: United Kingdom
- Post town: ROCHESTER
- Postcode district: ME3
- Dialling code: 01634
- Police: Kent
- Fire: Kent
- Ambulance: South East Coast
- UK Parliament: Rochester and Strood

St Mary Hoo is a village and civil parish in Kent, England. It is on the Hoo Peninsula in the borough of Medway. According to the 2001 census it had a population of 244, falling to 238 at the 2011 Census.

The first appearance of the name is in 1240. St Mary's Church at St Mary Hoo was the parish church and gave its name to the village, and although it remains a Grade II building, dating from the 14th century, it has been reconstructed as a private house. Formally rebuilt in about 1881 of local ragstone, it has an unrestored 15th century southwest window that is noteworthy.

Newlands Farmhouse nearby along the ridge track to Northward Hill is a Grade II farmhouse which was built in 1746. A former house on the site was part of the estate of the Elizabethan diplomat John Somers or Somer.

The Old Rectory at St Mary Hoo is a Grade II house built in the late 18th century. It has a special place in scandals involving the royalty. The rectors from 1788 to 1875 were a father and son, both named R. Burt. The senior of the two, the Rev. Robert Burt, one of the prince's Chaplains in Ordinary, whose debts (of £500) were paid by the prince to release him from the Fleet Prison, performed the illegal marriage ceremony between Prince George (afterwards King George IV) and Mrs Fitzherbert in 1785. A plaque commemorating this event remains hidden in the old church of St Mary.

St Mary's Hall, also at St Mary Hoo, was built in the 17th century and added to in 1830. It was the home of the Victorian farm innovator Henry Pye between 1845 and 1909.

Fenn Farm House was built in the 15th century. In 1760 it was re-faced during the reign of George II. It was listed as a Grade 2 historic building in 2001.

== See also ==
- Listed buildings in St Mary Hoo
