= Listed buildings in Halling, Kent =

Civil Parish in Kent, England

Halling is a village and civil parish in the unitary authority of Medway in Kent, England. It contains one grade I, one grade II* and seven grade II listed buildings that are recorded in the National Heritage List for England.

This list is based on the information retrieved online from Historic England.

== Key ==
Grade	Criteria
I	Buildings that are of exceptional interest
II*	Particularly important buildings of more than special interest
II	Buildings that are of special interest

== Listing ==
Name	Grade	Location	Type	Completed (Note: The date given is the date used by Historic England as significant for the initial building or that of an important part in the structure's description.)	Date designated	Grid ref. (Note: The grid reference is based on the British national grid reference system, sometimes known as OSGB36, used by the Ordnance Survey.) Geo-coordinates	Notes	Entry number (Note: The "List Entry Number" is a unique number assigned to each listed building and scheduled monument by Historic England.)	Image	Wikidata
Court Farm	II				6 December 1991	TQ6904664485; 51°21′15″N 0°25′35″E		1255728	Upload Photo	Q26547295
94-96, High Street	II*	94-96, High Street			14 November 1986	TQ7043164039; 51°21′00″N 0°26′46″E		1336494	Upload Photo	Q17551616
Church of St John the Baptist	I	High Street			21 November 1966	TQ7052163886; 51°20′54″N 0°26′50″E		1085746	Church of St John the Baptist More images	Q17533091
The Manor House	II	122 and 124, High Street			24 January 1985	TQ7045863956; 51°20′57″N 0°26′47″E		1248128	Upload Photo	Q26540368
Walls to East of Church of St John the Baptist	II	High Street			14 November 1986	TQ7054063899; 51°20′55″N 0°26′51″E		1281213	Walls to East of Church of St John the Baptist More images	Q17673651
Clement's Farm House	II	Pilgrim's Way, Upper Halling			23 August 1974	TQ6889563686; 51°20′50″N 0°25′26″E		1085747	Upload Photo	Q26374124
Prings	II	Pilgrim's Way, Upper Halling			21 November 1966	TQ6927864534; 51°21′17″N 0°25′47″E		1204407	Upload Photo	Q26499852
Gateway to Whorns Place and Cart Shed	II	Rochester Road			27 August 1952	TQ7064766096; 51°22′06″N 0°27′00″E		1281223	Upload Photo	Q26570288
Chapel Houses	II	1-3, The Street, Upper Halling			24 January 1985	TQ6900663868; 51°20′56″N 0°25′32″E		1085748	Upload Photo	Q26374129

== See also ==
- Grade I listed buildings in Kent
- Grade II* listed buildings in Kent

== Sources ==
- Newman, John (2012) [1969], Kent: West and the Weald, The Buildings of England, New Haven and London: Yale University Press, ISBN 978-0-300-18509-6
