= Hoo St Werburgh =

Village in Kent, England

Coordinates: 51.423°N 0.558°E

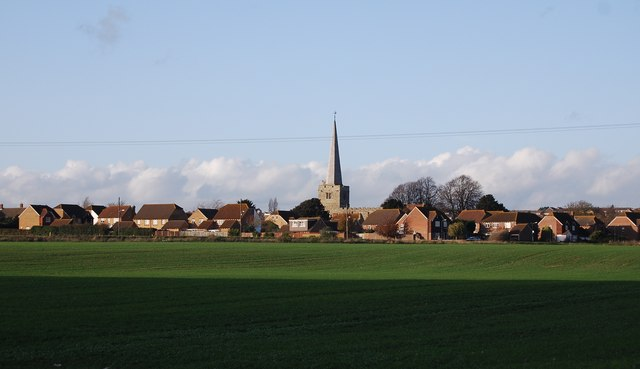
- View of Hoo from the Saxon Shore Way

- Location within Kent
- Population: 8,945 (2011)
- OS grid reference: TQ779725
- Civil parish: Hoo St Werburgh
- Unitary authority: Medway
- Ceremonial county: Kent
- Region: South East
- Country: England
- Sovereign state: United Kingdom
- Post town: ROCHESTER
- Postcode district: ME3
- Dialling code: 01634
- Police: Kent
- Fire: Kent
- Ambulance: South East Coast
- UK Parliament: Rochester and Strood

Hoo St Werburgh, commonly known as Hoo, is a large village and civil parish in the Medway district of Kent, England. It is one of several villages on the Hoo Peninsula to bear the name Hoo, a Saxon word believed to mean "spur of land" or to refer to the "distinct heel-shape of the ridge of hills" through the settlement. Hoo features in Domesday Book, and had a population of 7,356 at the 2001 census, rising to 8,945 at the 2011 census. The civil parish includes Chattenden to the west.

== History ==
St Werburgh was the daughter of King Wulfhere of Mercia, and niece of King Æthelred, his brother and successor. She was born between 640 and 650. The first church of Hoo may have been built in the reign of the 8th-century King Æthelbald of Mercia, though presumably a monastery existed nearby at an earlier time. This, together with land at Hoo All Hallows, is likely to have been placed under the rule of the leading Mercian monastery of Medeshamstede, now known as Peterborough.

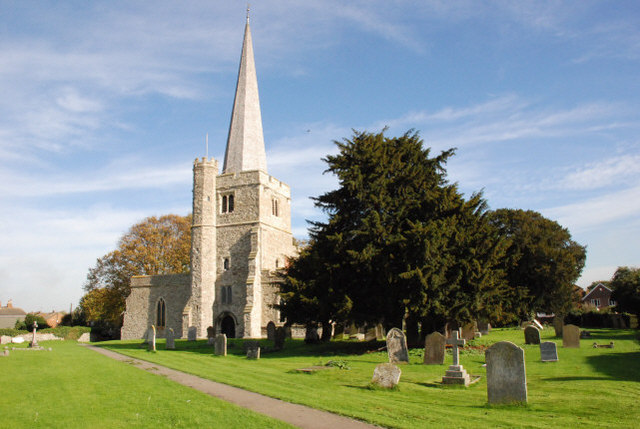
St Werburgh Church

A significant, and possibly unique, feature of this ancient parish church are the two Royal hatchments of Queen Elizabeth I and King James I. These were later restored and can be viewed in the church. The Reverend Ferdinando Booth of the same family as Archbishop Lawrence Booth was vicar here from 1675 to 1680.

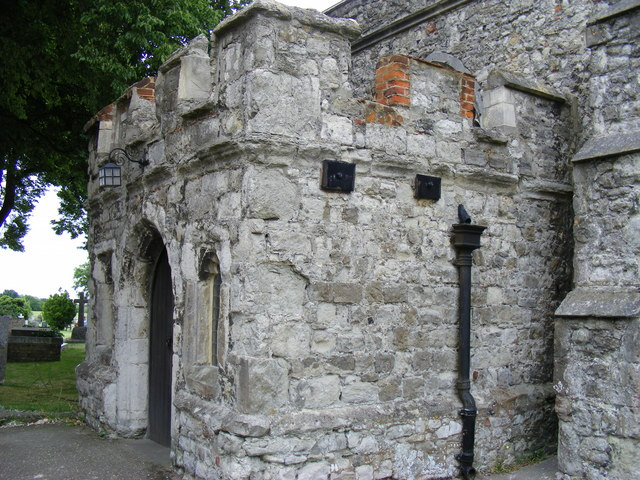
St Werburgh Church entrance

The parish records of 1851 gave the population as 1,065. According to official census figures, the population was, in 1891, 1,400; in 1971, 7,725; and in 1981, 7,944.

Broad Street appeared as Brodestrete in 1478. Jacobs Lane is named after the family of Stephen Jacobe of Hoo (1480). A workhouse was in use here until the 1930s, and the secondary school bears the name "The Hundred of Hoo Academy".

Hoo was connected to the Chattenden and Upnor Railway by a 1 mile (1.6 km)-long branch which closed in the 1890s.

Although historically and mostly referred to as Hoo, in 1955 the Parish Council, during a revision of the Ordnance Survey map of the area, requested that Hoo should be shown as 'Hoo St Werburgh'. The Parish Council formally submitted an application in February 1968, under Section 147(4) of the Local Government Act 1933, for the name of the civil parish to be changed to 'Hoo St Werburgh'. In response, the County Council presented a change of name document which ordered and declared that with effect from the first day of October 1968, and until further order, the name of the civil parish shall be Hoo St Werburgh.

== Village amenities ==
Hoo Village Hall & Jubilee Hall are located on Pottery Road Recreation Ground. Hoo Village Hall & Jubilee Hall are run as a charitable trust by a management committee.

Hoo has one 1.5-acre allotment site (made up of 35 plots) located off Everest Drive. The allotments site is managed by the Parish Council.

Formerly a primary school, Hoo has a library located next to St Werburgh Church on Church Street. The library is managed by Medway Council.

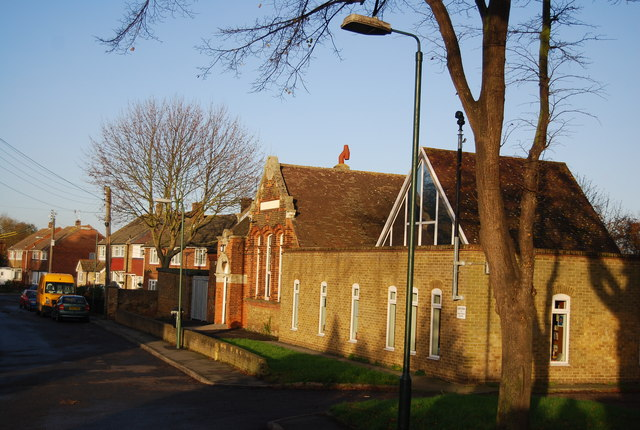
Hoo Library

Hoo has one public convenience (toilets, including disabled toilet) and carpark located on Stoke Road. The public convenience and carpark is managed by Medway Council.

Hoo has a 1.0-acre green and landscaped gardens located in the centre. The village green and gardens are managed by Medway Council. The gardens are also looked after and tended to by a group of volunteer residents.

Hoo has a pond and surrounding nature reserve located off Hemony Grove. The pond and reserve is managed by a private maintenance company, although the site is open to the public for recreation. Public liaison is Medway Council.

=== Recreation grounds ===
Hoo has three recreation grounds managed by the Parish Council.

Kingshill Recreation Ground, located off Fourwents Road, is a 7.71-acre site which includes a play park, surfaced football and basketball pitch, woodland walks and open space surrounded by treeline.

Pottery Road Recreation Ground, located off Pottery Road, is a 5.32-acre site which includes an older children's play park and separate younger children's play park, enclosed surfaced football and basketball pitch, skate half pipe, skate ramps, adult exercise equipment, sheltered seating area and open space surrounded by treeline.

Hoo Common, located off Elm Avenue, is a large site which includes woodland walks, meadows and open space surrounded by treeline.

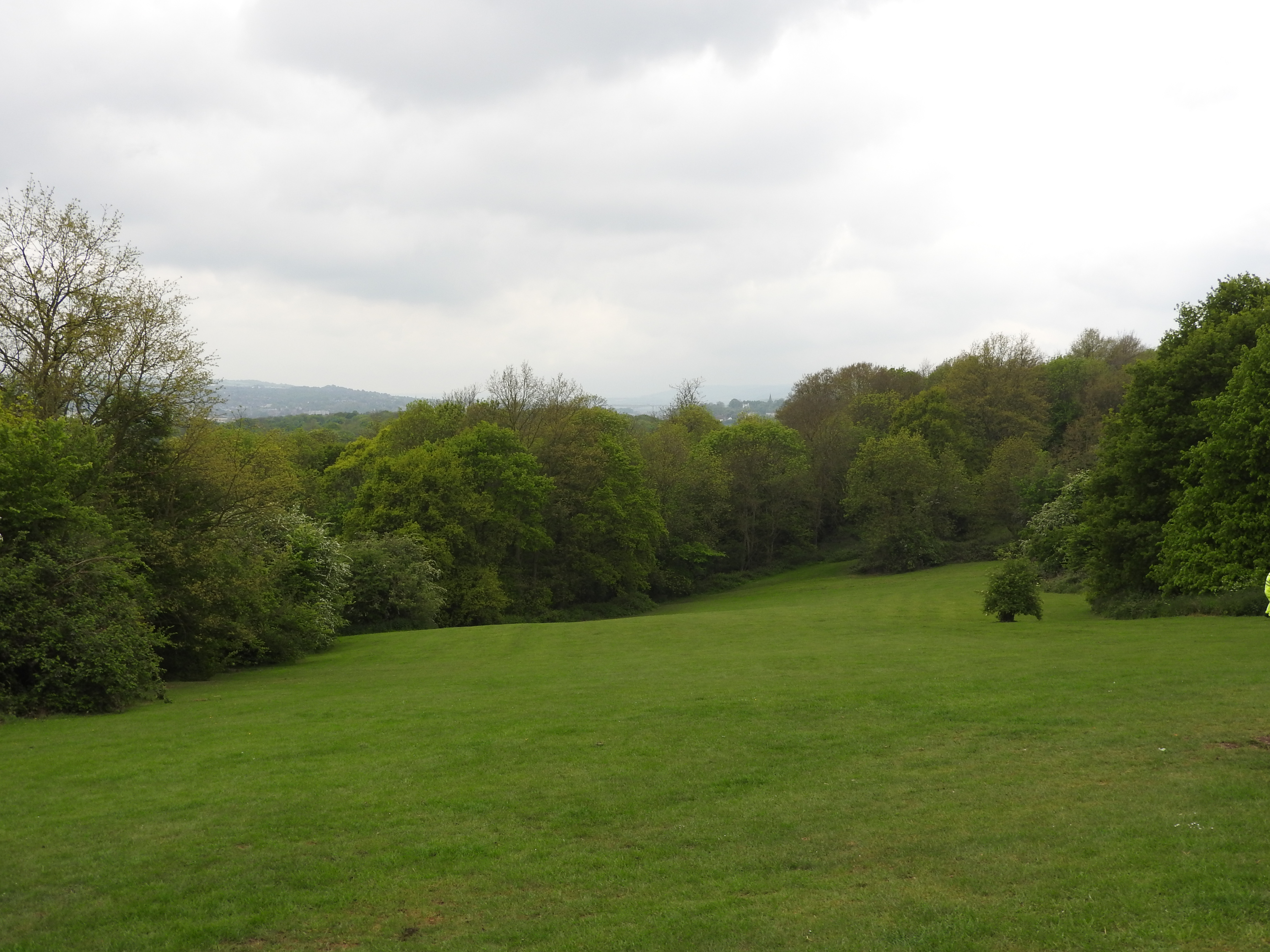
Hoo Common

=== Transport ===
Arriva Southern Counties operates bus route 191 to Chatham every 20 minutes, with one service every hour continuing in the opposite direction to Isle of Grain.

== Future development ==
As part of the developing Local Plan, Medway Council has proposed to expand and develop Hoo into a "small rural town". The expansion could be supported by a new railway station.

== Education ==
Hoo is served by a number of schools.

Hoo St Werburgh Primary School is for pupils aged 4–11 years of age. There are a total of 386 pupils arranged into 14 classes with two classes per year group. Attached to the school is the Marlborough Centre which caters for children diagnosed as autistic. The centre has 54 children arranged into six classes.

The Hundred of Hoo Academy (formerly The Hundred of Hoo School) is for pupils aged 4–18 years of age. There are a total of 1,757 pupils. The academy holds specialist Arts College status and is named after the "hundred of Hoo" featured in Domesday Book. The academy offers advanced media facilities and provides secondary education as well as one form entry primary education. Pupils draw from the various villages on the Hoo Peninsula.

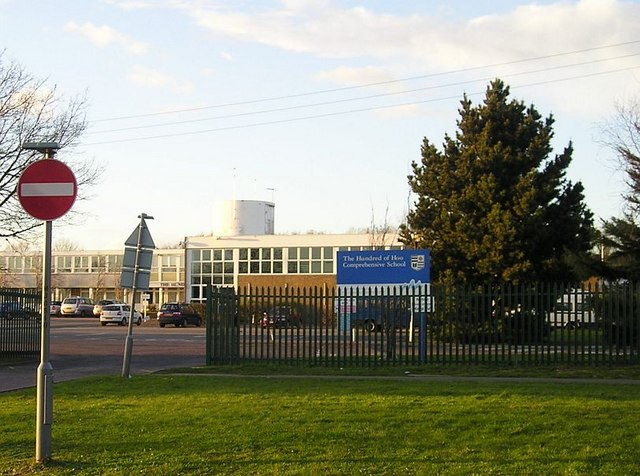
Hundred of Hoo Academy

== Governance ==
Hoo is within the Rochester & Strood parliament constituency.

=== Local government ===
Hoo is governed by two tiers of local government:

- Medway Council is a Unitary Authority, responsible for the majority of council services, combining the typical functions of a county council and a district council.
- Hoo Parish Council is a Parish Council, responsible for a small number of local council services.

Party	Seats	Hoo Parish Councillors (as of 2019)
Independent	15	

== Notable residents ==
Thomas Aveling, a pioneering agricultural engineer, was born in Elm, Cambridgeshire on 11 September 1824 before moving to Hoo. He was the co-founder of Aveling and Porter which became the largest manufacturer of steam rollers in the world. Aveling died on 7 March 1882 and is buried in the churchyard at St Werburgh Church. There is a road in Hoo called Aveling Close, named after Aveling.

William Lionel Wyllie, a prolific maritime painter, was born in Camden Town, London on 5 July 1851. He once lived at Hoo Lodge, located on top of a ridge, which would have provided inspiration with its panoramic view of the River Medway and the maritime activity at Chatham Dockyard. The corvette HMS Calypso (1883) was built at Chatham, which Wyllie painted in 1897. Wyllie died on 6 April 1931 at Primrose Hill, London. There is a road in Hoo called Wylie Road (incorrectly spelled), named after Wyllie.

Declan Galbraith, best known for his 2002 hit single "Tell Me Why", which peaked at #29 in the UK Singles Chart, is from Hoo.

Pauline Parker, known for the 1954 Parker–Hulme murder case in Christchurch, New Zealand, now lives in Hoo following her release after serving a 5-year prison sentence. She currently runs a children's riding school in the area.

== See also ==
- Listed buildings in Hoo St Werburgh
- Strood
- Rochester
- Kent
