= Listed buildings in St Mary Hoo =

Civil Parish in Kent, England

St Mary Hoo is a village and civil parish in the unitary authority of Medway in Kent, England. It contains one grade II* and five grade II listed buildings that are recorded in the National Heritage List for England.

This list is based on the information retrieved online from Historic England.

== Key ==
Grade	Criteria
I	Buildings that are of exceptional interest
II*	Particularly important buildings of more than special interest
II	Buildings that are of special interest

== Listing ==
Name	Grade	Location	Type	Completed (Note: The date given is the date used by Historic England as significant for the initial building or that of an important part in the structure's description.)	Date designated	Grid ref. (Note: The grid reference is based on the British national grid reference system, sometimes known as OSGB36, used by the Ordnance Survey.) Geo-coordinates	Notes	Entry number (Note: The "List Entry Number" is a unique number assigned to each listed building and scheduled monument by Historic England.)	Image	Wikidata
Former Airship Shed at Moat Farm	II	Moat Farm Road, St. Mary Hoo			24 February 2009	TQ8064976827; 51°27′42″N 0°35′57″E		1393144	Upload Photo	Q26672331
Fenn Street Farm House	II	Ratcliffe Highway, St. Mary Hoo			14 November 1986	TQ7970675383; 51°26′56″N 0°35′05″E		1336497	Upload Photo	Q26620985
Church of St Mary	II*	St. Mary Hoo			21 November 1966	TQ8037176593; 51°27′34″N 0°35′42″E		1085756	Church of St Mary More images	Q17551288
Newland's Farm House	II	St. Mary Hoo			21 November 1966	TQ7963476287; 51°27′25″N 0°35′03″E		1204525	Upload Photo	Q26499965
St Mary's Hall	II	St. Mary Hoo			14 November 1986	TQ8041476526; 51°27′32″N 0°35′44″E		1281165	Upload Photo	Q26570236
The Old Rectory	II	St. Mary Hoo			21 November 1966	TQ8030476779; 51°27′41″N 0°35′39″E		1085757	Upload Photo	Q26374166

== See also ==
- Grade I listed buildings in Kent
- Grade II* listed buildings in Kent

== Sources ==
- Newman, John (2012) [1969], Kent: West and the Weald, The Buildings of England, New Haven and London: Yale University Press, ISBN 978-0-300-18509-6
