= Listed buildings in Cooling, Kent =

Civil Parish in Kent, England

Cooling is a village and civil parish in the unitary authority of Medway in Kent, England. It contains three grade I and six grade II listed buildings that are recorded in the National Heritage List for England.

This list is based on the information retrieved online from Historic England.

== Key ==
Grade	Criteria
I	Buildings that are of exceptional interest
II*	Particularly important buildings of more than special interest
II	Buildings that are of special interest

== Listing ==
Name	Grade	Location	Type	Completed (Note: The date given is the date used by Historic England as significant for the initial building or that of an important part in the structure's description.)	Date designated	Grid ref. (Note: The grid reference is based on the British national grid reference system, sometimes known as OSGB36, used by the Ordnance Survey.) Geo-coordinates	Notes	Entry number (Note: The "List Entry Number" is a unique number assigned to each listed building and scheduled monument by Historic England.)	Image	Wikidata
Barn 20 Yards South East of Cooling Court	II				14 November 1986	TQ7549574991; 51°26′48″N 0°31′27″E		1281348	Upload Photo	Q26570405
Barn 30 Yards North East of Cooling Castle Gatehouse	II				14 November 1986	TQ7543275910; 51°27′18″N 0°31′25″E		1281341	Upload Photo	Q26570397
Chest Tomb 10 Yards South of Church of St James	II				14 November 1986	TQ7562775930; 51°27′18″N 0°31′35″E		1204131	Upload Photo	Q94998922
Church of St James	I				21 November 1966	TQ7562475949; 51°27′19″N 0°31′35″E		1204117	Church of St James More images	Q2323935
Comport and Baker Tombs 5 Yards to South of Church of St James	II				14 November 1986	TQ7563175937; 51°27′19″N 0°31′35″E		1085769	Comport and Baker Tombs 5 Yards to South of Church of St James More images	Q26374223
Cooling Castle Gatehouse	I				21 November 1966	TQ7538775892; 51°27′17″N 0°31′23″E		1085770	Cooling Castle Gatehouse More images	Q131580275
Cooling Court	II				21 November 1966	TQ7549775042; 51°26′50″N 0°31′27″E		1085772	Upload Photo	Q26374228
Inner Ward to Cooling Castle	I				21 November 1966	TQ7536875942; 51°27′19″N 0°31′22″E		1085771	Inner Ward to Cooling Castle More images	Q17533131
Marshgate and Cartshed to East	II				21 November 1966	TQ7597976118; 51°27′24″N 0°31′54″E		1085773	Upload Photo	Q26374234

== See also ==
- Grade I listed buildings in Kent
- Grade II* listed buildings in Kent

== Sources ==
- Newman, John (2012) [1969], Kent: West and the Weald, The Buildings of England, New Haven and London: Yale University Press, ISBN 978-0-300-18509-6
