= Listed buildings in Cliffe and Cliffe Woods =

Historic structures in Kent, England

Cliffe and Cliffe Woods is a village and civil parish in the unitary authority of Medway in Kent, England. It contains one grade I, one grade II* and 23 grade II listed buildings that are recorded in the National Heritage List for England.

This list is based on the information retrieved online from Historic England.

== Key ==
Grade	Criteria
I	Buildings that are of exceptional interest
II*	Particularly important buildings of more than special interest
II	Buildings that are of special interest

== Listing ==
Name	Grade	Location	Type	Completed (Note: The date given is the date used by Historic England as significant for the initial building or that of an important part in the structure's description.)	Date designated	Grid ref. (Note: The grid reference is based on the British national grid reference system, sometimes known as OSGB36, used by the Ordnance Survey.) Geo-coordinates	Notes	Entry number (Note: The "List Entry Number" is a unique number assigned to each listed building and scheduled monument by Historic England.)	Image	Wikidata
Gattons Farmhouse	II				21 November 1966	TQ7456975116; 51°26′53″N 0°30′39″E		1336467	Upload Photo	Q26620956
Granary 20 Yards North East of West Court Farmhouse	II				14 November 1986	TQ7233475423; 51°27′06″N 0°28′44″E		1085761	Upload Photo	Q26374181
West Court Farmhouse	II				14 November 1986	TQ7231275417; 51°27′05″N 0°28′43″E		1085760	Upload Photo	Q26374176
Allens Hill Farmhouse	II	Buckland Road			14 November 1986	TQ7308776533; 51°27′41″N 0°29′25″E		1336468	Upload Photo	Q26620957
Barn at Buckland Farm	II	Buckland Road			14 November 1986	TQ7314974870; 51°26′47″N 0°29′25″E		1336469	Upload Photo	Q26620958
Granary at Buckland Farm	II	Buckland Road			14 November 1986	TQ7315974847; 51°26′46″N 0°29′25″E		1085763	Upload Photo	Q26374193
Manor Farmhouse	II	Buckland Road			21 November 1966	TQ7309776407; 51°27′37″N 0°29′25″E		1085762	Upload Photo	Q26374187
170-174, Church Street	II	170-174, Church Street			14 November 1986	TQ7365176564; 51°27′41″N 0°29′54″E		1085766	Upload Photo	Q26374207
176, Church Street	II	176, Church Street			14 November 1986	TQ7365676599; 51°27′42″N 0°29′54″E		1281409	Upload Photo	Q26570462
185, Church Street	II	185, Church Street			17 July 1990	TQ7363776586; 51°27′42″N 0°29′53″E		1086505	Upload Photo	Q26377441
Chantry Cottage	II	187, Church Street			17 July 1990	TQ7363776591; 51°27′42″N 0°29′53″E		1278057	Upload Photo	Q26567423
Charnel House at North West Corner of Churchyard	II	Church Street			14 November 1986	TQ7350976655; 51°27′44″N 0°29′47″E		1085764	Charnel House at North West Corner of Churchyard More images	Q26374197
Church of St Helen	I	Church Street			21 November 1966	TQ7359476626; 51°27′43″N 0°29′51″E		1204042	Church of St Helen More images	Q17533308
Cliffe War Memorial	II	Church Street, Cliffe, Kent, ME3 7QF			23 May 2016	TQ7357676602; 51°27′42″N 0°29′50″E		1432857	Upload Photo	Q26677868
Harvey Monument 20 Yards South West of South Porch of Church of St Helen	II	Church Street			14 November 1986	TQ7357376602; 51°27′42″N 0°29′50″E		1085765	Upload Photo	Q26374202
Longford House	II	Church Street			21 November 1966	TQ7365876611; 51°27′43″N 0°29′54″E		1336471	Upload Photo	Q26620960
Quickrills	II	Church Street			21 November 1966	TQ7360076405; 51°27′36″N 0°29′51″E		1336470	Upload Photo	Q26620959
Smith Monument 30 Yards West of Church of St Helen	II	Church Street			14 November 1986	TQ7355076617; 51°27′43″N 0°29′49″E		1281406	Upload Photo	Q26570459
Steel and Hatch Monument 1 Yard South of South Aisle of Church of St Helen	II	Church Street			14 November 1986	TQ7359676614; 51°27′43″N 0°29′51″E		1204054	Upload Photo	Q26499543
Barn at Rye Farm	II	Common Lane			14 November 1986	TQ7475376406; 51°27′35″N 0°30′51″E		1281378	Upload Photo	Q26570431
Court Sole	II	Pond Street			21 November 1966	TQ7360876708; 51°27′46″N 0°29′52″E		1336472	Upload Photo	Q26620961
The Rectory House	II*	Rectory Road			21 November 1966	TQ7333874867; 51°26′47″N 0°29′35″E		1204092	Upload Photo	Q17551373
The Red House	II	Reed Street			14 November 1986	TQ7371276645; 51°27′44″N 0°29′57″E		1085767	Upload Photo	Q26374213
Mortimer's Farm House	II	Town Road			14 November 1986	TQ7370474169; 51°26′24″N 0°29′52″E		1204114	Upload Photo	Q26499593
Walnut Tree Cottage	II	Wharfe Lane			14 November 1986	TQ7399376673; 51°27′44″N 0°30′12″E		1085768	Upload Photo	Q26374219

== See also ==
- Grade I listed buildings in Kent
- Grade II* listed buildings in Kent

== Sources ==
- Newman, John (2012) [1969], Kent: West and the Weald, The Buildings of England, New Haven and London: Yale University Press, ISBN 978-0-300-18509-6
