= Cliffe and Cliffe Woods =

Civil parish in Kent, England

Coordinates: 51.46200°N 0.49750°E

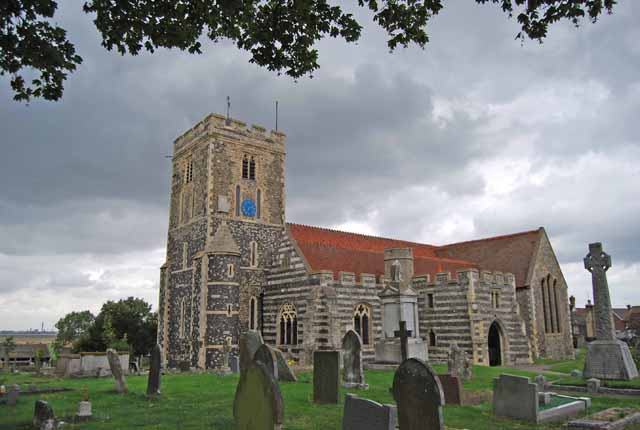
- St Helen's Church, Cliffe

- Location within Kent
- Population: 5,370 2011 Census
- Civil parish: Cliffe and Cliffe Woods
- Shire county: Kent
- Region: South East
- Country: England
- Sovereign state: United Kingdom
- Post town: Rochester
- Postcode district: ME3
- Police: Kent
- Fire: Kent
- Ambulance: South East Coast

Cliffe and Cliffe Woods is a civil parish in the borough of Medway in Kent, England. The parish is located on the Hoo Peninsula and comprises the villages of Cliffe and the suburb, Cliffe Woods. At the 2011 Census the population of the civil parish was 5,370. In the west of the Cliffe and Cliffe Woods parish are the Cliffe Pools.

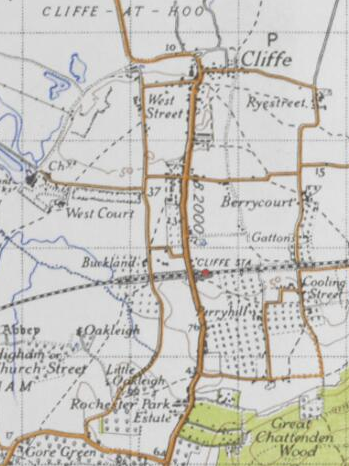
1940s map of the area around Cliffe village, before Cliffe Woods developed.

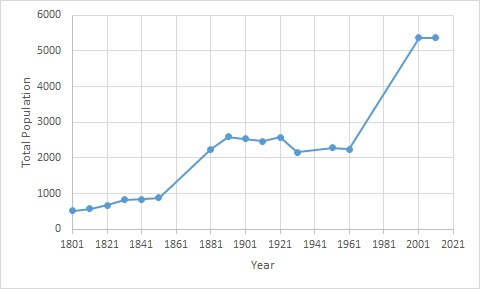
Parish population time series

== See also ==
- Listed buildings in Cliffe and Cliffe Woods
