= South Thames Estuary and Marshes =

Biological site in Kent

Coordinates: 51.471°N 0.576°E

- Site of Special Scientific Interest
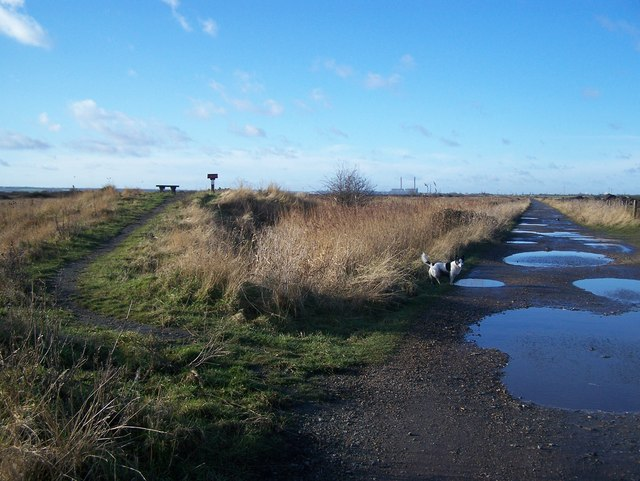
- Location of South Thames Estuary and Marshes.
- Area of search: Kent
- Grid reference: TQ 790 778
- Interest: Biological
- Area: 5,289.0 hectares (13,069 acres)
- Notification date: 1991
- Location map: Magic Map

South Thames Estuary and Marshes is a 5,289-hectare (13,070-acre) biological Site of Special Scientific Interest which stretches between Gravesend and the mouth of the River Medway in Kent. Part of it is a Nature Conservation Review site, Grade I, and part is a Royal Society for the Protection of Birds nature reserve. It is part of the Thames Estuary and Marshes Ramsar internationally important wetland site and Special Protection Area under the European Union Directive on the Conservation of Wild Birds.

The site consists of a range of habitats including mudflats, saltmarsh, grazing marsh and stretches of shingle. Inland are freshwater lagoons and some patches of deciduous woodland. Over 20,000 migratory waterfowl use this site in the winter, and some species such as greater white-fronted goose, shelduck, gadwall, teal, northern pintail, shoveler, grey plover, curlew and black-tailed godwit are present in internationally important numbers. There are also a number of breeding birds including garganey, avocet, northern pintail, bearded reedling, hen harrier, short-eared owl, ruff, common tern and European golden plover. There are nationally scarce plants on dykes and the drier parts of the site, and the saltmarsh is dominated by salt grasses, the glassworts Salicornia, sea aster, sea lavender and sea purslane. Also present are the nationally scarce plants golden samphire and Puccinellia fasciculata. The diverse invertebrates include nationally rare beetles, flies and true bugs; the scarce emerald damselfly and eight species of water beetle, including the great silver water beetle, are found here.

Major institutions that own land within Thames Estuary and Marshes SSSI include the Church Commissioners (St Marys Marshes), the Ministry of Defence (Grain Marsh), and the Royal Society for the Protection of Birds (Cliffe Pools).
