= Listed buildings in Hoo St Werburgh =

Historic structures in Kent, England

Hoo St Werburgh is a village and civil parish in the unitary authority of Medway in Kent, England. It contains one grade I and 21 grade II listed buildings that are recorded in the National Heritage List for England.

This list is based on the information retrieved online from Historic England.

== Key ==
Grade	Criteria
I	Buildings that are of exceptional interest
II*	Particularly important buildings of more than special interest
II	Buildings that are of special interest

== Listing ==
Name	Grade	Location	Type	Completed (Note: The date given is the date used by Historic England as significant for the initial building or that of an important part in the structure's description.)	Date designated	Grid ref. (Note: The grid reference is based on the British national grid reference system, sometimes known as OSGB36, used by the Ordnance Survey.) Geo-coordinates	Notes	Entry number (Note: The "List Entry Number" is a unique number assigned to each listed building and scheduled monument by Historic England.)	Image	Wikidata
Pair of Second World War Concrete Roadblock Plinths	II	East of Hoo St Werburgh			16 November 2020	TQ7890672826; 51°25′34″N 0°34′19″E		1471998	Upload Photo	Q102231226
Two WWI Sentry Posts	II				21 August 2014	TQ7581072831; 51°25′38″N 0°31′39″E		1421214	Upload Photo	Q26676846
Type 24 Second World War Pillbox	II	East of Hoo St Werburgh			16 November 2020	TQ7892472786; 51°25′33″N 0°34′20″E		1472635	Upload Photo	Q102231381
Type 24 Second World War Pillbox	II	South of Abbots Court Cottages, Hoo St Werburgh			16 November 2020	TQ7908872125; 51°25′11″N 0°34′27″E		1472644	Upload Photo	Q102231501
Type 24 Second World War Pillbox	II	South of Abbots Court Lodge, Hoo St Werburgh			16 November 2020	TQ7903172699; 51°25′30″N 0°34′25″E		1472643	Upload Photo	Q102231460
Type 28 Second World War Pillbox	II	in the Garden of Abbots Court Lodge, Hoo St Werburgh			16 November 2020	TQ7901672758; 51°25′32″N 0°34′25″E		1472640	Upload Photo	Q102231421
Four Pillboxes	II	Bells Lane (off), Hoo St. Werburgh			20 April 2007	TQ7804273194; 51°25′47″N 0°33′35″E		1391937	Upload Photo	Q26671268
Church of St Werburgh	I	Church Street, Hoo St. Werburgh			21 November 1966	TQ7834671856; 51°25′04″N 0°33′48″E		1204440	Church of St Werburgh More images	Q17533348
Ivy House	II	Church Street, Hoo St. Werburgh			21 November 1966	TQ7833472059; 51°25′10″N 0°33′48″E		1204447	Upload Photo	Q26499889
The Chequer's Public House	II	Church Street, Hoo St. Werburgh			14 November 1986	TQ7834871962; 51°25′07″N 0°33′49″E		1085752	Upload Photo	Q26374152
Lancer's Farmhouse	II	Jacob's Lane, Hoo St. Werburgh			14 November 1986	TQ7997972809; 51°25′33″N 0°35′15″E		1085753	Upload Photo	Q26374156
Meadow House	II	Main Road, Hoo St. Werburgh			14 November 1986	TQ7817872128; 51°25′13″N 0°33′40″E		1204460	Upload Photo	Q26499902
Mill House	II	Ratcliffe Highway, Hoo St. Werburgh			14 November 1986	TQ7698572772; 51°25′35″N 0°32′40″E		1085754	Upload Photo	Q26374162
Hoo St Werburgh War Memorial	II	St Werburgh's Churchyard, Church Street, Hoo, Rochester, ME3 9AL, Hoo St. Werburgh			26 January 2018	TQ7841271906; 51°25′05″N 0°33′52″E		1451504	Upload Photo	Q66479157
Cold Arbour	II	Stoke Road, Hoo St. Werburgh			14 November 1986	TQ8072374334; 51°26′21″N 0°35′56″E		1204464	Upload Photo	Q26499906
White Hill House	II	Stoke Road, Hoo St. Werburgh			14 November 1986	TQ8086973931; 51°26′08″N 0°36′03″E		1336495	Upload Photo	Q26620983
Building 106	II	WWI Sentry Post, Lodge Hill, Hoo St. Werburgh			26 May 2011	TQ7512772684; 51°25′34″N 0°31′03″E		1400882	Upload Photo	Q26675445
Building 127	II	WWI Sentry Post, Lodge Hill, Hoo St. Werburgh			26 May 2011	TQ7556373122; 51°25′48″N 0°31′27″E		1400885	Upload Photo	Q26675446
Building 67	II	WWI Sentry Post, Lodge Hill, Hoo St. Werburgh			26 May 2011	TQ7601773140; 51°25′48″N 0°31′50″E		1400879	Upload Photo	Q26675444

== See also ==
- Grade I listed buildings in Kent
- Grade II* listed buildings in Kent

== Sources ==
- Newman, John (2012) [1969], Kent: West and the Weald, The Buildings of England, New Haven and London: Yale University Press, ISBN 978-0-300-18509-6
