= Listed buildings in Cuxton =

Civil Parish in Kent, England

Cuxton is a village and civil parish in the unitary authority of Medway in Kent, England. It contains one grade I, one grade II* and three grade II listed buildings that are recorded in the National Heritage List for England.

This list is based on the information retrieved online from Historic England.

== Key ==
| Grade | Criteria |
|---|---|
| I | Buildings that are of exceptional interest |
| II* | Particularly important buildings of more than special interest |
| II | Buildings that are of special interest |

== Listing ==
| Name | Grade | Location | Type | Completed (Note: The date given is the date used by Historic England as significant for the initial building or that of an important part in the structure's description.) | Date designated | Grid ref. (Note: The grid reference is based on the British national grid reference system, sometimes known as OSGB36, used by the Ordnance Survey.) Geo-coordinates | Notes | Entry number (Note: The "List Entry Number" is a unique number assigned to each listed building and scheduled monument by Historic England.) | Image | Wikidata |
|---|---|---|---|---|---|---|---|---|---|---|
| Forge Cottage | II | Bush Road, Lower Bush | | | 14 November 1986 | TQ6965367190; 51°22′42″N 0°26′11″E | | 1281351 | Upload Photo | Q26570408 |
| Church of St Michael | I | Rochester Road | | | 21 November 1966 | TQ7095966451; 51°22′17″N 0°27′17″E | | 1085774 | Church of St Michael More images | Q17533144 |
| Whorns Place | II | Rochester Road | | | 27 August 1962 | TQ7066266120; 51°22′07″N 0°27′01″E | | 1204204 | Upload Photo | Q26499675 |
| Cuxton Signal Box | II | Station Road, Rochester, ME2 1AB | | | 29 April 2013 | TQ7141966715; 51°22′25″N 0°27′41″E | | 1413571 | Cuxton Signal Box More images | Q26676346 |
| White Hart House | II | Sundridge Hill | | | 21 November 1966 | TQ7113966832; 51°22′29″N 0°27′27″E | | 1085775 | White Hart House More images | Q26374239 |
| Barrow Hill House | II | Upper Bush Road, Upper Bush | | | 18 February 1985 | TQ6955766832; 51°22′31″N 0°26′05″E | | 1085737 | Upload Photo | Q26374081 |
| High Birch | II* | Upper Bush Road, Upper Bush | | | 27 August 1952 | TQ6953066795; 51°22′30″N 0°26′04″E | | 1281324 | High Birch More images | Q17551543 |

== See also ==
- Grade I listed buildings in Kent
- Grade II* listed buildings in Kent

== Sources ==
- Newman, John (2012) [1969], Kent: West and the Weald, The Buildings of England, New Haven and London: Yale University Press, ISBN 978-0-300-18509-6
