= Listed buildings in High Halstow =

Civil Parish in Kent, England

High Halstow is a village and civil parish in the unitary authority of Medway in Kent, England. It contains one grade I and six grade II listed buildings that are recorded in the National Heritage List for England.

This list is based on the information retrieved online from Historic England.

== Key ==
Grade	Criteria
I	Buildings that are of exceptional interest
II*	Particularly important buildings of more than special interest
II	Buildings that are of special interest

== Listing ==
Name	Grade	Location	Type	Completed (Note: The date given is the date used by Historic England as significant for the initial building or that of an important part in the structure's description.)	Date designated	Grid ref. (Note: The grid reference is based on the British national grid reference system, sometimes known as OSGB36, used by the Ordnance Survey.) Geo-coordinates	Notes	Entry number (Note: The "List Entry Number" is a unique number assigned to each listed building and scheduled monument by Historic England.)	Image	Wikidata
Buck Hole Farmhouse	II				21 November 1966	TQ7749975967; 51°27′17″N 0°33′12″E		1204431	Upload Photo	Q26499876
Dux Court	II				14 November 1986	TQ7761474531; 51°26′31″N 0°33′15″E		1085749	Upload Photo	Q26374133
Wybornes Farmhouse	II				14 November 1986	TQ7723475018; 51°26′47″N 0°32′57″E		1204433	Upload Photo	Q26499878
Church of St Margaret	I	Cooling Road			21 January 1966	TQ7797675278; 51°26′55″N 0°33′36″E		1204435	Church of St Margaret More images	Q17533335
Great Dalham	II	Cooling Road			14 November 1986	TQ7734375376; 51°26′59″N 0°33′03″E		1085751	Upload Photo	Q26374147
The Red Dog Public House	II	Cooling Road			14 November 1986	TQ7802675283; 51°26′55″N 0°33′38″E		1085750	Upload Photo	Q26374139
Building 219, Wwi Sentry Post, Lodge Hill	II	Wwi Sentry Post, Lodge Hill			26 May 2011	TQ7706473839; 51°26′09″N 0°32′46″E		1400888	Upload Photo	Q26675447

== See also ==
- Grade I listed buildings in Kent
- Grade II* listed buildings in Kent

== Sources ==
- Newman, John (2012) [1969], Kent: West and the Weald, The Buildings of England, New Haven and London: Yale University Press, ISBN 978-0-300-18509-6
