= Halling, Kent =

Village in Kent, England

Coordinates: 51°21′12″N 0°26′38″E

Halling
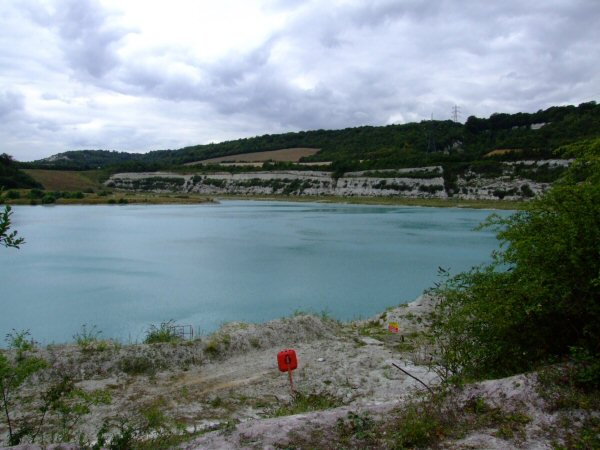
- Halling Lake

- Location within Kent
- Population: 2,821 (2011)
- OS grid reference: TQ7064
- Unitary authority: Medway
- Ceremonial county: Kent
- Region: South East
- Country: England
- Sovereign state: United Kingdom
- Post town: Rochester
- Postcode district: ME2 1..
- Dialling code: 01634
- Police: Kent
- Fire: Kent
- Ambulance: South East Coast
- UK Parliament: Rochester & Strood

Halling is a village on the North Downs in the northern part of Kent, England. Consisting of Lower Halling, Upper Halling and North Halling, it is scattered over some 3 miles (5 km) along the River Medway parallel to the Pilgrims' Way which runs through Kent.

The origin of the name is uncertain. The following have been proposed at various times: Halls land (belonging to Hall), Heall land (from Old English, Hall Manor), Heallgemot (the court of the lord of the manor) and Heallingas (companions sharing the same hall).

== Early history ==
"Halling Man", a Neolithic skeleton discovered in 1912 behind the present railway station, is the earliest indication of activity in Halling. There is evidence of Roman settlement indicated by a number of burials from the period as well as Roman tiles. The first written record dates from the 8th century. In the Charter for Halling (765-785 AD), Ecgberht II of Kent granted to St. Andrew of Rochester "ten sulings at Halling with rights to pasture swine in five districts".

== Modern Halling ==
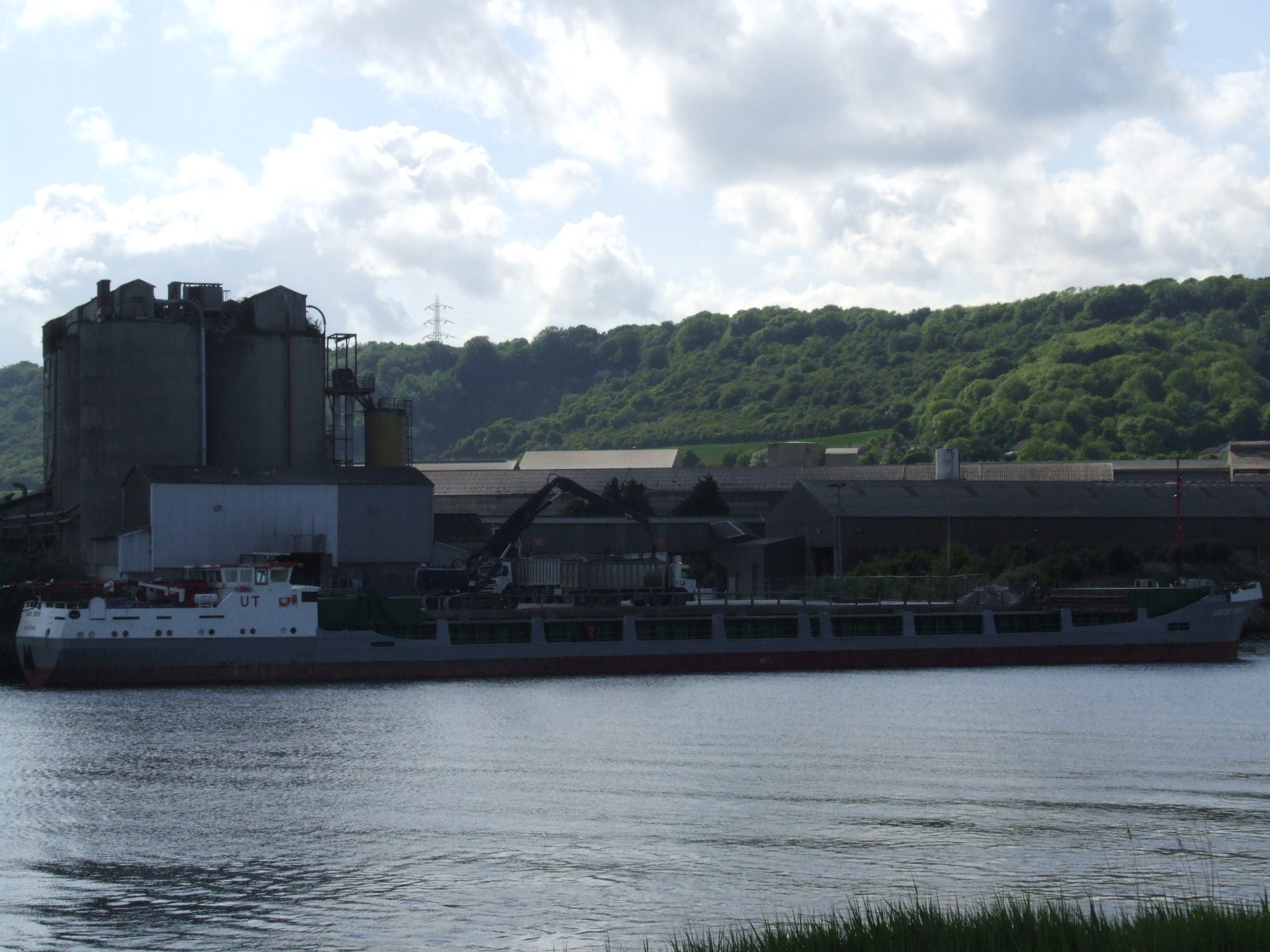
Union Moon unloading at Halling cement works

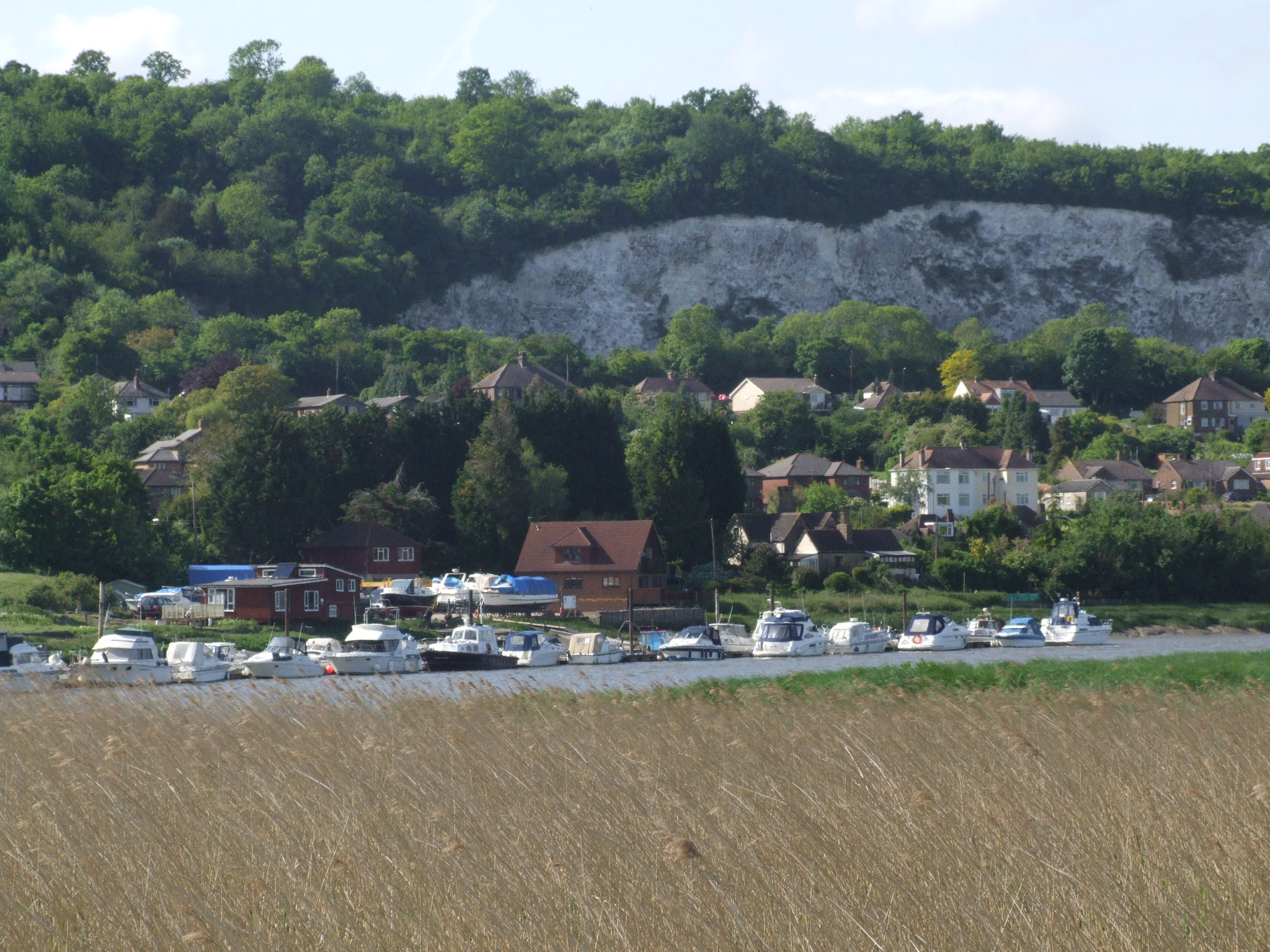
From Wouldham Marshes, over the Medway to houses in North Halling, with cliffs of Bore's Hole and May Wood to the top left.

Halling had a small industrial presence in the eighteenth and nineteenth centuries, with two chalk mining and processing factories, however these have all now been shut and the last chimney stack was demolished in 2010.

Since before World War II, quarries have been dug in Halling, at first by hand, for the extraction of chalk for cement manufacture. The chalk was mainly shipped by barge via the River Medway.

Halling is connected with other villages and towns along the river by the Medway Valley railway line, running from Tonbridge and Maidstone to Strood. Also there are good road links as the village sits between the M20 and the M2.

The chalk quarrying industry in Halling had a great influence, including the building material of the majority of the village houses, the livelihood of many families and the improvement of its road and railway connections. However, although the area of these activities spread into what was Green Belt land, some of these areas have now reverted to the community or built upon. Parts of the village are restricted by the Green Belt regulations, limiting growth of industrial and residential areas alike.

Despite the influence of the chalk industry in the past in Halling, modern technology, practices and the closure of the factories have meant that there are now very few if any workers required. Instead, the working population of the village mainly commutes to London and nearby towns.

== Landmarks and features ==
The village has a church (St John the Baptist), Post Office, New Town social Club run by Peter Humphreys, two pubs, a small convenience store, two youth/community centres, General Practice and primary school. In addition to this, Upper Halling has both a pumping station (built recently, after a Victorian one was converted into accommodation), filter beds and small underground reservoir and spring.

Halling is also the site of a former Bishop's Palace, a luxury provided by the pre-Reformation Catholic Church to its bishops. It is now a ruin, but publicly accessible. There are also a number of old World War II defences situated along the riverside and evidence remains of the former ferry crossing behind the church to the other side of the Medway.

One of Halling's most distinguishing features is its large blue lake, which was dug due to the chalk quarrying efforts. Its blue colour comes from the suspension of chalk particles in the water. It is fed by a large spring, one of which is tapped to provide the local water supply. The water is so clean at extraction that only minimal chemical additives was required from the water company to satisfy government health and safety legislation.

== Notable people ==
TV and radio presenter Caroline Feraday grew up in the village.

George Edward Brett, who was born in the village, created the first American office of Macmillan Publishers, called Macmillan & Co. of New York.

== See also ==
- Listed buildings in Halling, Kent
