= Barry Johnson =

Barry Johnson may refer to:

- Barry Johnson (GC) (born 1952), Royal Army Ordnance Corps soldier awarded the George Cross
- Barry Johnson (hurler) (born 1984), Irish sportsperson
- Barry Johnson (judoka) (born 1947), Australian Olympic judoka
- Barry Edward Johnson (1937–2002), English mathematician
- Barry Johnson (rugby league), rugby league footballer of the 1970s and 1980s
- Barry Johnson (musician), singer, songwriter, and guitarist of American punk rock band Joyce Manor
- Barry Johnson (artist), American artist
- Barry Johnson (American football) (born 1968), American football player

== See also ==
- Barry Johnston (disambiguation)
