= Ammunition technician =

British Army specialist soldier

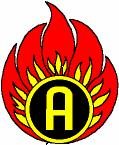
The AT Badge

An ammunition technician (AT) is a British Army soldier, formerly of the Royal Army Ordnance Corps but since 1993 of the Royal Logistic Corps, trained to inspect, repair, test, store, and modify all ammunition, guided missiles, and explosives used by the British Army. These technicians are also trained to use demolition to safely dispose of individual items of ammunition and explosives (EODs) or to conduct logistics disposal of bulk stocks of multi items. After gaining sufficient experience, those who show the appropriate qualities are given extra training to render safe improvised explosive devices (IEDs) by a process called improvised explosive device disposal. Experienced ATs may be called to give evidence as expert witnesses in criminal or coroner's courts in relation to ammunition or explosives or to EOD and IEDD duties. The AT were previously called Ammunition Examiners (AE).

== History ==
Within the Royal Army Ordnance Corps, the regulation of service, storage, examination and issue of ammunition was possibly one of the oldest function of the Corps. ) and it was in the safeguarding of ammunition stockpiles during the wars that the Ammunition Examiner proved his worth. Promotion however was limited up to Warrant Officer Class (WO) 2 and at this stage the AE had to re-muster in the trade of RAOC Clerk in order to obtain higher rank. In 1948, the increased responsibility of the ammunition organization in Ordnance Services and in order to use the experience of these highly skilled tradesmen both as Warrant Officers and as Officers, the RAOC decided that promotion to WO1 would be introduced. RAOC Instruction No 466 introduced a new type of Quartermaster commission into the Royal Army Ordnance Corps to permit the Warrant Officer Ammunition Examiner being commissioned within the sphere of his normal employment on ammunition duties. These commissioned WOs would be called Assistant Inspecting Ordnance Officers (AIOOs).

== Training ==
Training was initially undertaken at Bramley in Hampshire at the School of Ammunition. However the school moved to Kineton in 1974. To qualify to attend the Ammunition Technician Class 2 course, a soldier must first pass a pre-select course, during which time they will be assessed for suitability for role. The pre-selection includes psychometric testing, leadership skills, problem solving, resource planning and numeracy tests.

The basic AT course is 9 months in duration, the first part of which is spent at The Royal Military College of Science. The instruction within the Defence College of Management and Technology forms the first phase of the 9-month course. The aim of the first part is to provide the scientific and technical basis for further training in ammunition and explosives. The syllabus is an integrated study of mathematics, ballistics, explosives and general chemistry, physics, metallurgy, electronics and the design of armoured vehicles, artillery and infantry weapons. Time is also spent on nuclear, biological and chemical weapons design and the related protection systems. The remainder of the course covers conventional land munitions, explosive demolitions, conventional munitions disposal, guided weapons and explosive theory and safety. The majority of the course takes place at the Defence EOD Munitions Search Training Regiment (DEMS Trg Regt). Training previously took place at the Defence EOD Munitions Search School Kineton, DEMSS Kineton, and before that the Army School of Ammunition.

After 3 years gaining experience in trade, these technicians will be selected to return to Kineton to attend their Class 2 to Class 1 Upgrading Course, a 3-month course to broaden their technical knowledge and ability in munitions incident investigations, large scale demolitions and the disposal of chemical and biological munitions.

The Royal Logistic Corps Ammunition Technicians trained at Kineton are regarded throughout the world as the subject matter experts in the management of munitions and in Improvised Explosive Device (IED) disposal as a result of their combined experience in Palestine, Cyprus, Hong Kong, Northern Ireland, Iraq, Afghanistan, Aden, Malaya and other conflicts.

Commissioned officers are known as Ammunition Technical Officers and for the Sandhurst entrant, they complete a 17-month technical course in the rank of captain. ATs that become commissioned later in their service are also referred to as ATOs and will be granted the ato qualification by a testing board based on their experience, knowledge and competence.

== Scope of work ==
ATs are employed within the Royal Logistic Corps of the British Army and are the technical experts in storing and processing ammunition in base depots or field storage sites at home or on operations where safety in storage is paramount to overall force protection. ATs develop specialist skills to look after the Ministry of Defence stockpiles of ammunition by carrying out surveillance tasks, testing, inspecting, maintaining and disposing of all sorts of ammunition, from bullet clips, anti-aircraft guided weapon systems, mines, mortars, tank rounds and aircraft bombs. The Ammunition Technician profession also exists in the Canadian Department of National Defence, Australian RAAOC, and New Zealand RNZALR. Ammunition Technicians trained at the Defence Explosive Ordnance Disposal, Munitions and Search School, also work on loan service engagements in a number of African, Far Eastern and Middle Eastern armed forces.

In the United Kingdom, bomb disposal is carried out by the Royal Navy and the Royal Logistic Corps and Royal Engineers branches of the British Army. The majority of counter terrorist bomb disposal and conventional munitions disposal activity in the UK is carried out by the Ammunition Technicians of the Royal Logistic Corps, while the Royal Navy Clearance Divers deal with items below the high water mark and underwater tasks. The Royal Engineers deal with minefields, conventional, and German WWII aircraft bombs.

== Operational honours ==
The trade of Ammunition Technician is one of the most highly decorated professions in the British Army. The trade has been awarded 231 British gallantry awards as follows:

- George Cross - 9
- George Medal - 80
- Conspicuous Gallantry Cross - 1
- Military Cross - 3
- Queen's Gallantry Medal - 100
- MBE for Gallantry - 14
- BEM for Gallantry - 23

In addition, Ammunition Technicians and Ammunition Technical Officers have also received almost 200 Mention in Dispatches, King's or Queen's Commendations for Bravery.

A further 100 awards of the MBE and BEM have been made to Ammunition Technicians for distinguished service within their trade.

These decorations have been awarded since 1940 and in places such as Aden, Afghanistan, Albania, Burma, Cyprus, Egypt, France, Germany, Gibraltar, Great Britain, Greece, Hong Kong, Iraq, Italy, Kuwait, Malaya, Malta, Northern Ireland, Pacific, Sicily and Yugoslavia.

=== George Cross ===
- Staff Sergeant Sydney Rogerson GC. Royal Army Ordnance Corps. 11 October 1946.
- Warrant Officer Class 1 Barry Johnson GC Royal Army Ordnance Corps. 6 November 1990
- Staff Sergeant Olaf Sean Schmid GC Royal Logistic Corps 19 March 2010
- Staff Sergeant Kim Spencer Hughes GC Royal Logistic Corps 19 March 2010

=== George Medal ===
- Sergeant FW Pearce GM Royal Army Ordnance Corps 1944.
- Sergeant AT Taylor GM Royal Army Ordnance Corps 8 March 1957.
- Warrant Officer Class 2 BJC Reid GM Royal Army Ordnance Corps 1966.
- Sergeant AE Dedman GM Royal Army Ordnance Corps 1972.
- Warrant Officer Class 1 PES Gurney GM Royal Army Ordnance Corps 1973. Peter Gurney was later awarded a bar to his GM as a civilian.
- Sergeant JA Anderson GM Royal Army Ordnance Corps 1980.
- Warrant Officer Class 1 JRT Balding GM Royal Logistic Corps 1993, first GM awarded to member of the newly formed Royal Logistic Corps.
- Warrant Officer Class 1 NB Thomsen GM Royal Logistic Corps 1995.
- Warrant Officer Class 2 A Islam GM QGM Royal Logistic Corps 1997.
- Warrant Officer Class 2 G O'Donnell Royal Logistic Corps 2006 and 2009. Posthumously awarded a second GM in March 2009 for "repeated and sustained acts of immense bravery" in Afghanistan.
- Warrant Officer Class 2 K Ley GM Royal Logistic Corps 24 September 2010

=== Conspicuous Gallantry Cross ===
- Staff Sergeant James Anthony Wadsworth CGC Royal Logistic Corps. 7 March 2008

=== Military Cross ===
- Staff Sergeant Gareth Wood MC Royal Logistic Corps 24 September 2010

=== Queen's Gallantry Medal ===
- Warrant Officer Class 1 Richard Gill QGM Royal Army Ordnance Corps 7 October 1974
- Staff Sergeant Arthur Burns QGM Royal Army Ordnance Corps 6 January 1975
- Warrant Officer Class 1 Thomas Edward Robinson QGM Royal Army Ordnance Corps 16 July 1975
- Warrant Officer Class 2 Kevin Callaghan GM QGM Royal Army Ordnance Corps 20 October 1980
- Warrant Officer Class 1 Ernest Lenard Bienkowski QGM Royal Army Ordnance Corps 14 April 1987
- Warrant Officer Class 1 Robert John McLelland QGM, Royal Logistic Corps. 21 November 1994
- WO1 Eamon Conrad Heakin QGM and Bar, BSM, Royal Logistic Corps. 7 September 2004. Eamon Heakin was later awarded a bar to his QGM in 2008 along with the Bronze Star Medal.
- Warrant Officer Class 2 Colin Robert George Grant QGM, Royal Logistic Corps 11 September 2009
- Warrant Officer Class 2 Ian Trevor Grey QGM Royal Army Ordnance Corps 14 April 1980

=== MBE for Gallantry ===
- WO2 Henry Albert Vaughan MBE RAOC 16 February 1968.
- WO1 Stanley Gordon Woods MBE RAOC 10 May 1968.
- WO1 Frederick William Wood MBE RAOC 12 November 1968.

=== BEM for Gallantry ===
- Sergeant Gordon Epps BEM RAOC 31 December 1946
- WO2 Donald Frederick Tildesley BEM RAOC 4 November 1949.
- Sergeant Donald Lawrence Birch BEM RAOC 10 May 1968.
- Staff Sergeant David Greenaway BEM RAOC 18 Mar 1974.

== RAOC/RLC EOD Memorial ==
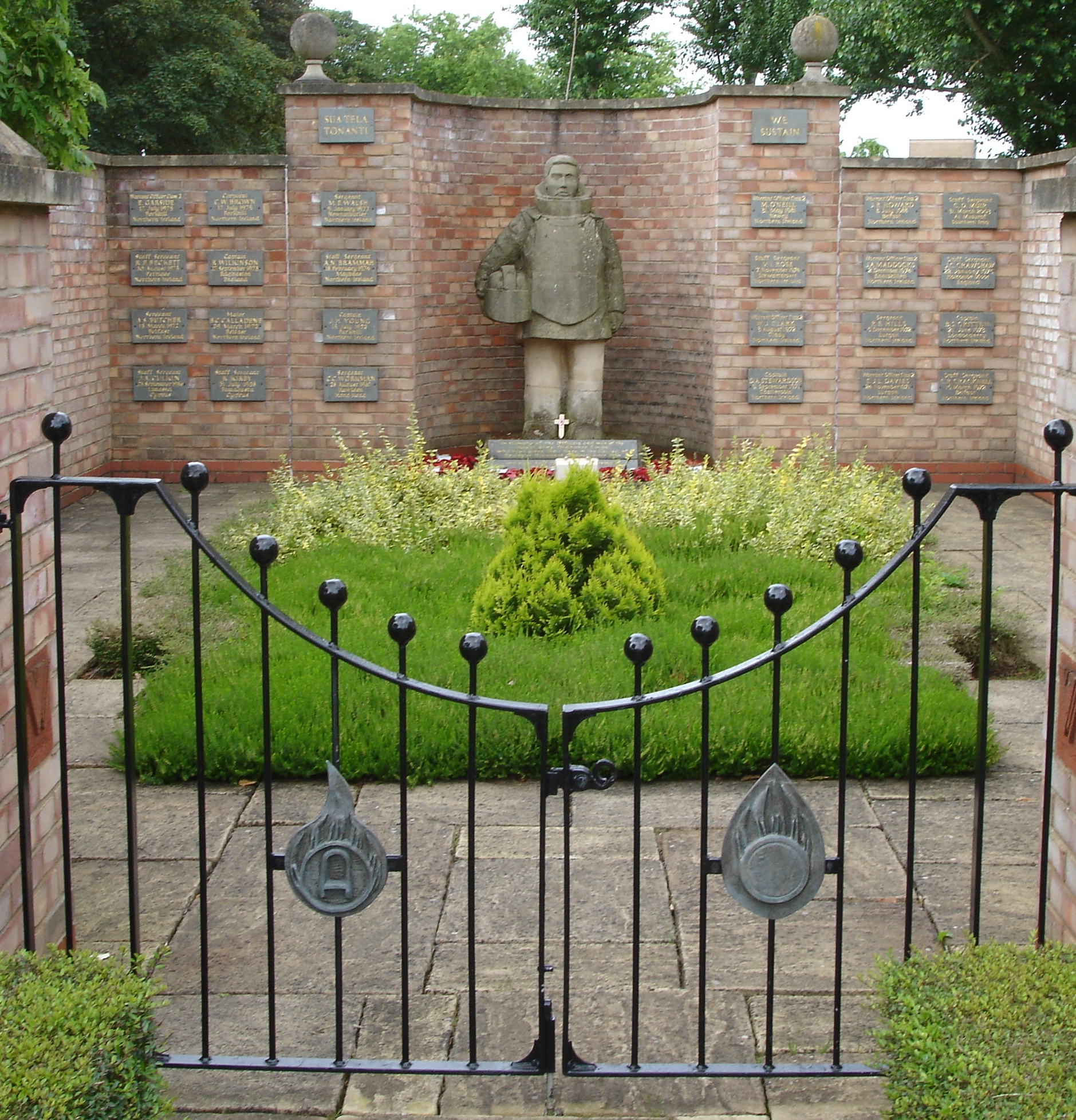
RAOC and RLC EOD Memorial

The Ammunition Technician trade has lost a number of their colleagues killed in action whilst undertaking operational Explosive Ordnance Disposal tasks worldwide. Ammunition Technicians have their own memorial at Marlborough Barracks, Temple Herdewyke in Warwickshire, the home of the trade.

The idea of a memorial was initiated by the senior Warrant Officers of the trade and supported by the Director of Land Service Ammunition and his staff. A RAOC EOD Memorial Working Party was set up and reported progress to the Director General of Ordnance Services. The memorial was funded by RAOC central funds, donations from industry and from private donations from individual technicians within the trade. There were also some significant donations in kind, all the bricks for the enclosure and surrounding wall were gifted by a local brickworks and the shrubbery was donated and planted by a local nursery. The memorial was designed by the Fine Arts Department of Coventry Polytechnic and sculpted from local sandstone. In the centre of the memorial, there is a statue of a single bomb disposal operator, dressed in the bomb suit and holding his protective helmet. The memorial is enclosed behind double wrought iron gates bearing the trade badges of the ATO and AT. The gates lead into a walled garden with 2 stone benches. The walls bear grey slate tablets, each engraved with the name of those killed, the date and location of the incident. A small brass plaque records the award of posthumous gallantry medals or decorations.

The memorial was formally opened during a dedication service on 23 June 1991. The service of dedication was led by the Chaplain General to the Forces, The Reverend James Harkness OBE QHC MA with readings by WO1 (Staff Sergeant Major) B Johnson GC and Major General PWE Istead CB OBE GM, Representative Colonel Commandant, RAOC. Amongst the guests at the service where the widows and families of many of those whose names appear on the memorial. A parade and the annual service of remembrance by members of the units based at Kineton is held at the EOD Memorial on Remembrance Sunday in November each year.

The EOD memorial is dedicated to the fallen ATO's and AT's of The Royal Army Ordnance Corps and The Royal Logistic Corps, who died in places such as Cyprus, Hong Kong, Northern Ireland, England, Iraq and Afghanistan.

=== In Memoriam ===
- SSgt JA Culkin
- SSgt R Kirby
- Sgt CC Workman
- Capt DA Stewardson
- WO2 CJL Davies
- SSgt CR Cracknell
- Sgt AS Butcher
- Maj BC Calladene
- Capt JH Young
- WO 2 WJ Clark
- Sgt RE Hills
- Capt BS Gritten
- SSgt RF Beckett
- Capt R Wilkinson
- SSgt AN (Allan) Brammagh. 18 February, 1974. N.Ireland.
- SSgt VI Rose
- WO2 JA Maddocks
- SSgt JC Crawshaw
- WO2 E Garside
- Cpl CW Brown
- Sgt ME Walsh
- WO2 M O'Neill
- WO2 JR Howard
- SSgt CD Muir
- WO2 GJ O'Donnell GM+
- Capt DM Shepherd GM
- SSgt OSG Schmid GC
- Capt D Read
- SSgt BG Linley GM
- Capt LJ Head

== See also ==
- Ammunition Technical Officer (ATO)
- William DG Hunt
- Bomb disposal
- RAAOC - Royal Australian Ordnance Corps
