= William D. G. Hunt =

William Dennis Goodchild Hunt MBE (born 8 May 1955 in Essex, England) served a full career in the British Army as an Ammunition Technician (AT) and Ammunition Technical Officer (ATO) and served in the UK (including Northern Ireland), mainland Europe as well as the Middle and Far East.

A strong advocate of raising standards in the industry, William campaigns for the expansion of International Mine Action Standards (IMAS) to cover offshore UXO detection and clearance operations.

== Career ==
Prior to commissioning, William Hunt attained the highest non-commissioned appointment of Conductor. Prominent posts within the military service were:

- Senior Ammunition Technician British Army of the Rhine (1988–1990)
- Senior Ammunition Technician 321 EOD Squadron RAOC Northern Ireland (1990–1992)
- Military Advisor to Royal Brunei Armed Forces (1992–1994)
- Second-in-Command 521 EOD Squadron RLC (1994–1996)
- Defence Evaluation and Research Agency (1996–1998)

Throughout his military service, Hunt was primarily concerned with Explosive Ordnance Disposal (EOD), including Improvised Explosive Device Disposal (IEDD) in high-threat terrorist environments in Northern Ireland, Europe and the Middle East.

On leaving the military in 1998 after 26 years service, he became a consultant to NATO in the Balkans throughout the Kosovo crisis, where he remained supporting several projects until 2002. In Albania, he designed, set up executed NATOs first Partnership for Peace (PFP) Demilitarization Trust Fund project which successfully destroyed the country's entire stockpile of anti-personnel landmines.

Over the period '02–09 Hunt was involved with the Sakhalin II integrated Oil and gas project in Far East Russia, advising on EOD and security issues. Hunt assisted BP with entry into the Rumaila oilfields 2010-2012 organizing EOD clearance and Unexploded Ordnance (UXO) mitigation tasks.

More recently he acted as Project Manager for the clearance of offshore remnants of war at Iraq's KAOOT and ABOT offshore oil terminals that were a legacy of the Iran Iraq and Gulf Wars.

== Awards ==
In 1993, Hunt was appointed Member of the Most Excellent Order of the British Empire (MBE) for services to counter-terrorism specifically for the development of effective strategic and tactical countermeasures.

His achievements were again formally recognized in 2003 by Queen Elizabeth and the Duke of Edinburgh at a special reception at Buckingham Palace in November 2003. The reception was to mark the contribution of 'Pioneers to the Life of the Nation'. He has also been decorated by the governments of the United Kingdom, HM The Sultan of Brunei and the General Staff of Russia.
