= Barry Johnston =

Barry Johnston may refer to:

- Barry Johnston (footballer) (born 1980), Irish footballer
- Barry Johnston (writer) (born 1949), British writer, audiobook producer, radio presenter and songwriter
- Berry Johnston (born 1935), American poker player

== See also ==
- Barry Johnson (disambiguation)
