= Improvised explosive device =

Unconventionally produced bomb

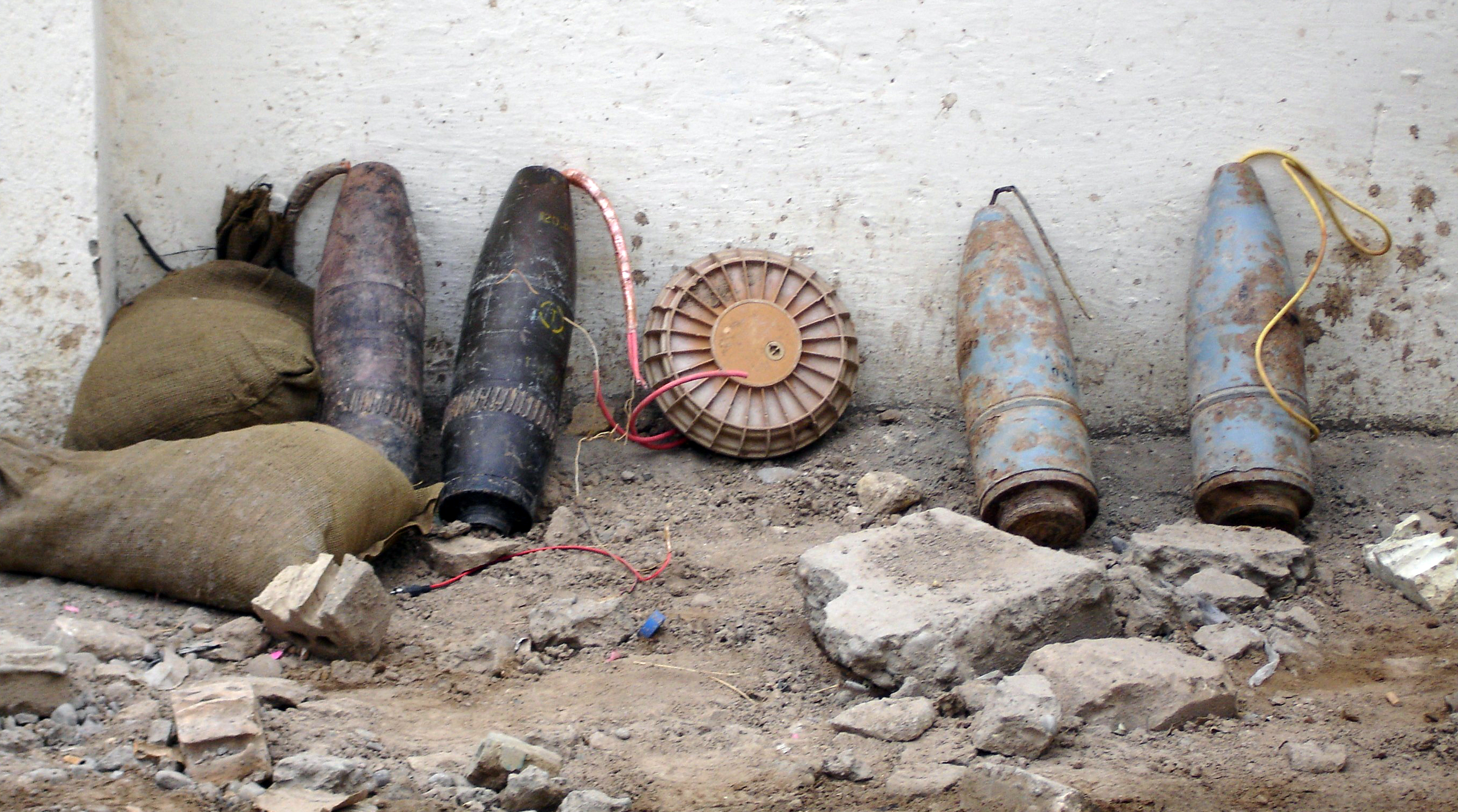
Artillery shells rigged for an IED, discovered in Baghdad by the Iraqi Police (November 2005).

An improvised explosive device (IED) is a bomb constructed and deployed in ways other than in conventional military action. It may be constructed of conventional military explosives, such as an artillery shell, attached to a detonating mechanism. IEDs are commonly used as roadside bombs, or homemade bombs.

The term "IED" was coined by the British Army during the Northern Ireland conflict to refer to booby traps made by the IRA, and entered common use in the U.S. during the Iraq War.

IEDs are predominantly utilized by violent non-state actors, such as guerrilla or terrorist organizations, who use them in the context of strategies and tactics of insurrection, guerrilla warfare, asymmetric warfare, urban warfare or in terrorist operations. IEDs can also be utilized by state special forces or commando forces, to conduct unconventional warfare in a theatre of operations, such as in the case, for example, of the United States Army Special Forces.

== Background ==
An IED can be defined as a device placed or fabricated in an improvised manner incorporating destructive, lethal, noxious, pyrotechnic or incendiary chemicals and designed to destroy, incapacitate, harass or distract; it may incorporate military stores, but is normally devised from non-military components. IEDs may incorporate military or commercially sourced explosives, and often combine both types, or they may otherwise be made with homemade explosives (HME).

An IED has generally five components: a switch (activator), an initiator (fuse), container (body), charge (explosive), and a power source (battery); an IED designed for use against armoured targets such as personnel carriers or tanks will be designed for armour penetration, by using, for example, a shaped charge that creates an explosively formed penetrator; IEDs are extremely diverse in design and may contain many types of initiators, detonators, penetrators, and explosive loads. Some particularly sophisticated IEDs can also incorporate anti-handling or anti-defusing systems: this was the case, for example, of the IED prepared by John Birges in 1980, used in an extortion attempt against the Harvey's Resort Hotel.

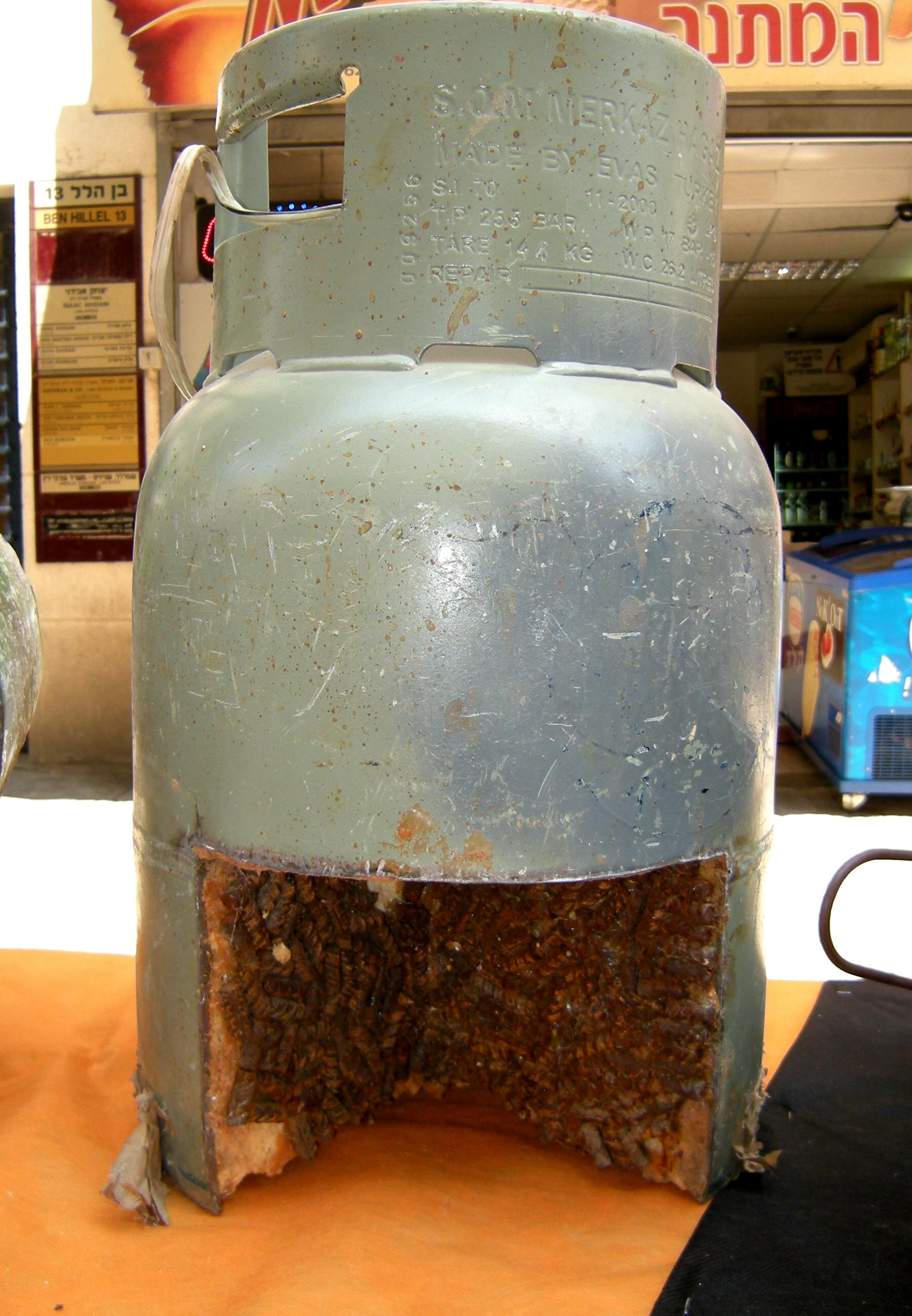
A modified gas cylinder, packed with explosive and pieces of rebar used as shrapnel, dissected for display.

Antipersonnel IEDs typically also contain fragmentation-generating objects such as nails, ball bearings or even small rocks to cause wounds at greater distances than blast pressure alone could. Injuries caused by antipersonnel improvised explosive devices (AP-IED) to dismounted (pedestrian) soldiers and civilians were reported in BMJ Open to be far worse than those caused by conventional antipersonnel mines (APM), resulting in multiple limb amputations and lower body mutilation. This combination of injuries has been given the name "Dismounted Complex Blast Injury" and is thought to be the worst survivable injury ever seen in war.

IEDs are triggered by various methods, including remote control, infrared or magnetic triggers, pressure-sensitive bars or trip wires (victim-operated). In some cases, multiple IEDs are wired together in a daisy chain to attack a convoy of vehicles spread out along a roadway.

IEDs made by inexperienced designers or with substandard materials may fail to detonate, and in some cases, they detonate on either the maker or the placer of the device. Some groups, however, have been known to produce sophisticated devices constructed with components scavenged from conventional munitions and standard consumer electronics components, such as mobile phones, washing machine timers, pagers, or garage door openers. The sophistication of an IED depends on the training of the designer and the tools and materials available.

IEDs may use artillery shells or conventional high-explosive charges as their explosive load as well as homemade explosives. However, the threat exists that toxic chemical, biological, or radioactive (dirty bomb) material may be added to a device, thereby creating other life-threatening effects beyond the shrapnel, concussive blasts and fire normally associated with bombs.

It is possible to categorize IEDs by warhead, by delivery mechanism, by trigger mechanism:

=== By warhead ===
The Dictionary of Military and Associated Terms (JCS Pub 1-02) includes two definitions for improvised devices: improvised explosive devices (IED) and improvised nuclear device (IND). These definitions address the Nuclear and Explosive in CBRNe. That leaves chemical, biological and radiological undefined. Four definitions have been created to build on the structure of the JCS definition. Terms have been created to standardize the language of first responders and members of the military and to correlate the operational picture.

==== General-purpose explosive charges ====
An IED may be equipped with a general-purpose explosive charge, designed to project a blast wave, with or without additional shrapnel materials, all around itself, for the purpose of inflicting damage to peoples and unarmored targets. Examples of such charges are those contained in IEDs such as pipe bombs, nail bombs, tin can grenades, pressure cooker bombs, car bombs, and so on.

In general, the nature and potential of the explosive substances contained in an IED – both in terms of the main explosive charge and the detonator – is extremely variable: military explosives obtained from modern conventional munitions, such as trinitrotoluene (TNT), Composition B, RDX, pentaerythritol tetranitrate (PETN); commercial or improvised explosives, such as dynamite, ammonium nitrate and fuel oil (ANFO), urea nitrate, chlorate/perchlorate mixtures, nitrate- and peroxide-based mixtures and compounds, triacetone triperoxide (TATP), hexamethylene triperoxide diamine (HMTD).

==== Directionally focused explosive charges ====
An IED may be equipped with a directionally focused explosive charge, designed to channel most of the force of the explosion in a single direction. Such IEDs are specifically built to be employed in an anti-personnel or anti-tank/anti-material role.

Examples of anti-personnel IEDs of this category are the fougasse and the grapeshot charge.

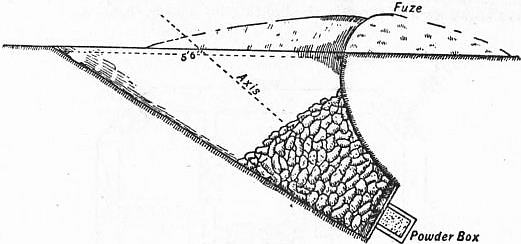
Fougasse.

A fougasse is an improvised mortar capable of a single discharge, constructed by making a hollow in the ground or rock, placing an explosive charge (originally black powder) at the bottom of it, then covered with various types of projectiles (originally stones); the hollow is camouflaged in the surrounding environment; the fougasse is then fired by means of a fuse or electrically, resulting in the projectiles to be scattered in front of it, along the axis of the excavation of the hollow. An IED with ancient origins, the fougasse was used in warfare – even in a configuration capable of launching incendiary liquids – at least until the Second World War and the Korean War.

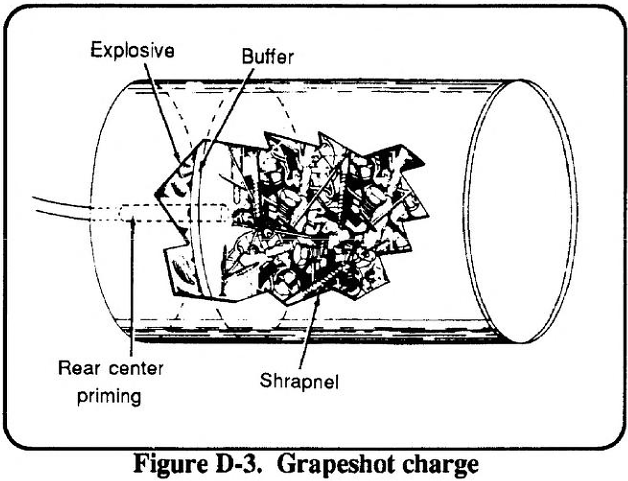
Improvised grapeshot charge.

A grapeshot charge employs the same general operating principle of the fougasse, but more closely resembling an improvised Claymore mine, also made for directional fragmentation. It is constructed by inserting its major components – projectiles, buffer material, explosive charge and blasting cap – in a portable container, such as a metal tube, an ammo can or a No. 10 can. The trajectory of the multiple projectiles – usually nails, bolts, nuts, ball bearings, glass, small pieces of scrap metal, rocks and other similar shrapnel materials – is flat, as if they were fired from a shotgun.

Examples of anti-tank/anti-material IEDs of this category are the shaped charge, the explosively formed penetrator/projectile (EFP) and the platter charge.

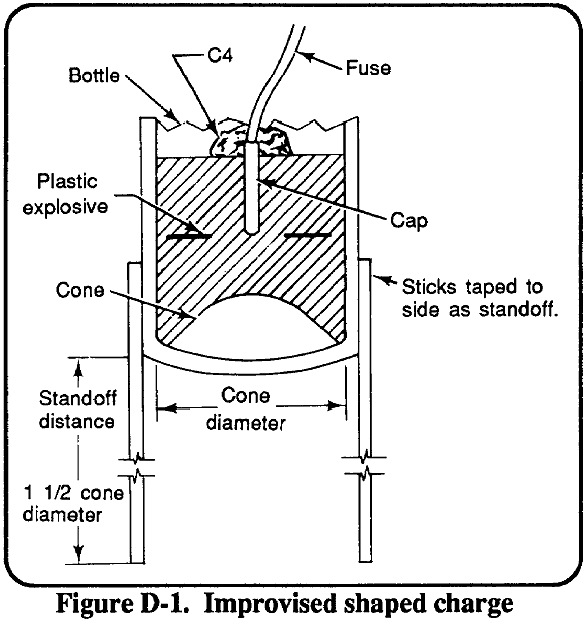
Improvised shaped charge.

A shaped charge concentrate the energy released by the explosion on a small area, making a tubular or linear fracture in the target; to do so, it present a cavity, usually cone-shaped and lined. The cavity liner can be made from copper, tin, zinc, or glass (funnels or bottles with a cone in the bottom, like champagne or cognac bottles). The high-explosive charge is placed at a very short distance from the target – but still kept at an adequate standoff distance – with the cavity facing the target. When the charge is detonated, the shock wave propagates from the detonator towards the cone-shaped cavity, thus producing a piercing jet of particles at high speed, temperature and pressure, capable of perforating concrete and armor, but which loses effectiveness after a short distance. Historical examples of improvised shaped charges are those devised by the Viet Cong during the Vietnam War, which were incorporated into various types of improvised weapons, such as bounding anti-tank/anti-vehicular mines, demolition charges and anti-tank hand grenades.

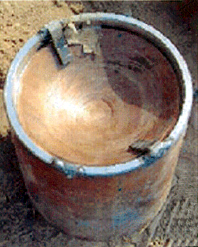
An improvised explosively formed penetrator/projectile (EFP).

An explosively formed penetrator/projectile (EFP) is a special type of shaped charge relying on the Misnay–Schardin effect; also cylindrical, it incorporate a thicker and heavier metal liner, usually a plate made of stamped or machined copper, with a concave lens or dish shape, pointed inward. The plate is aimed at the target. When the high-explosive charge, uniformly packed behind the liner/plate, is detonated, the liner/plate is formed into a projectile called "slug" or "penetrator", which is propelled toward the target at an extremely high velocity. The difference in the shape and weight of the liner allows an EFP to be effective at long standoffs from the target (100 meters or more), thus making it deployable from a greater distance than a traditional shaped charge. The "slug" produced by an EFP is capable of penetrating, from a distance, armoured targets like tanks, however, the accuracy of such devices is limited (approximately 50 meters), due to the way in which EFPs are produced: the "slug" projected from the explosion has no stabilization because it has no tail fins and it does not spin like a bullet from a rifle. This type of IED was used by insurgent forces in recent conflicts, such as the Iraq War (2003–2011), with lethal effects.

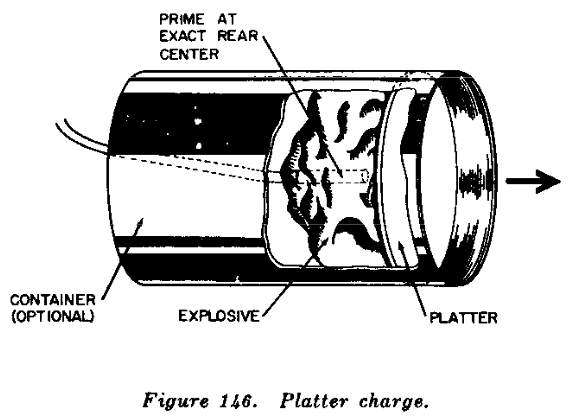
Improvised platter charge.

A platter charge, is similar to EFPs in construction. The main differences being that the explosive charge does not have a cavity, and that the plate is flat and not concave. Where an EFP made with machined copper to use copper's ductility to create a penetrator, steel plate is used for its strength to resist deformation. The flat face of the explosive charge uniformly launches the projectile. If the projectile deforms into a slug, then it is an EFP. The steel platter stays intact as a plate to use kinetic energy to spall the target if it does not punch through. If it is used in breaching, it can remove most or all of the reinforcing steel as it punches a hole about the size of the platter, whereas an EFP would simply punch a small but deep hole as a penetrator.

==== Chemical charges ====
An IED may incorporate toxic attributes of chemical materials designed to result in the dispersal of toxic chemical materials for the purpose of creating a primary patho-physiological toxic effect (morbidity and mortality), or secondary psychological effect (causing fear and behavior modification) on a larger population; such devices may be fabricated in a completely improvised manner or may be an improvised modification to an existing weapon. Substances that could potentially be used as improvised chemical charges include carbamates (Aldicarb), diisopropyl fluorophosphate (DFP) and organophosphates (parathion, methyl and ethyl).

==== Biological charges ====
An IED may incorporate biological materials designed to result in the dispersal of vector-borne biological material for the purpose of creating a primary patho-physiological toxic effect (morbidity and mortality), or secondary psychological effect (causing fear and behavior modification) on a larger population; such devices are fabricated in a completely improvised manner. Burkholderia mallei is the bacterium that causes the disease glanders, which could potentially be used as an improvised biological charge.

==== Incendiary charges ====
An IED may incorporate incendiary charges, for the purpose of causing and spreading a fire. Examples of such incendiary charges are those constituted by materials and mixtures such as, for example, napalm, thermite, magnesium powder, chlorine trifluoride, white phosphorus, chlorate and sugar, powdered aluminum and sulfur, and so on. Although purely incendiary improvised devices usually do not explode, they are still colloquially referred to as incendiary bombs.

==== Radiological charges ====
A speculative IED may incorporate radioactive materials, and being designed to disperse such materials for the purpose of area denial and economic damage, and/or for the purpose of creating a primary patho-physiological toxic effect (morbidity and mortality), or secondary psychological effect (causing fear and behavior modification) on a larger population. Such devices may be fabricated in a completely improvised manner or may be an improvised modification to an existing nuclear weapon. Also called a Radiological Dispersion Device (RDD) or "dirty bomb".

==== Nuclear charges ====
A speculative IED, defined as an improvised nuclear device, may incorporate a nuclear charge, most likely a crude atomic bomb of the gun-type.

=== By delivery mechanism ===
==== Car ====
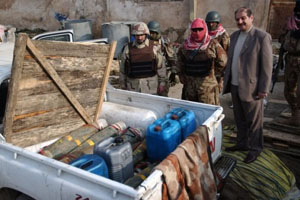
Artillery shells and gasoline cans discovered in the back of a pick-up truck in Iraq.

A vehicle-borne IED (VBIED) is a military term for a car bomb or truck bomb, which can carry a relatively large payload, but can also be any type of transportation, such as a bicycle or a motorcycle. They are typically employed by insurgents, for example by ISIS, which has used truck bombs with devastating effects. They can be detonated by remote control or by a passenger/driver. The act of a person's being in this vehicle and detonating it is known as an SVBIED suicide. On occasion the driver of the car bomb may have been coerced into delivery of the vehicle under duress, a situation known as a proxy bomb. Distinguishing features are low-riding vehicles with excessive weight, vehicles with only one passenger, and ones where the interior of the vehicles look as if they have been stripped down and built back up. Car bombs can carry thousands of pounds of explosives and may create additional shrapnel damage through the destruction of the vehicle itself and by the use of the vehicle fuel as an incendiary weapon.

==== Boat ====
A water-borne improvised explosive device (WBIED) is a surface or subsurface improvised explosive device that is anchored, floating, or propelled – for example, a small boat. An early example of this type was the Japanese Shinyo suicide boats during World War II. The boats were filled with explosives and attempted to ram Allied ships, sometimes successfully, having sunk or severely damaged several American ships by war's end. Suicide bombers used a boat-borne IED to attack the USS Cole; US and UK troops have also been killed by boat-borne IEDs in Iraq. The Liberation Tigers of Tamil Eelam (LTTE) have been known to use WBIEDs during the Sri Lankan Civil War. WBIEDs have also been used in the Red Sea.

==== Animal ====
Monkeys and war pigs were used as incendiaries around 1000 AD. More famously the "anti-tank dog" and "bat bomb" were developed during World War II. In recent times, a two-year-old child and seven other people were killed by explosives strapped to a horse in the town of Chita in Colombia. In Afghanistan, local insurgents have used animals to transport IEDs. The carcasses of certain animals were also used to conceal explosive devices by the Iraqi insurgency.

==== Collar ====
IEDs strapped to the necks of farmers have been used on at least three occasions by guerrillas in Colombia, as a way of extortion. American pizza delivery man Brian Douglas Wells was killed in 2003 by an explosive fastened to his neck, purportedly under duress from the maker of the bomb. In 2011 a woman in Sydney, Australia had a suspected collar bomb attached to her by an attacker in her home. The device was removed by police after a ten-hour operation and proved to be a hoax.

==== Suicide ====
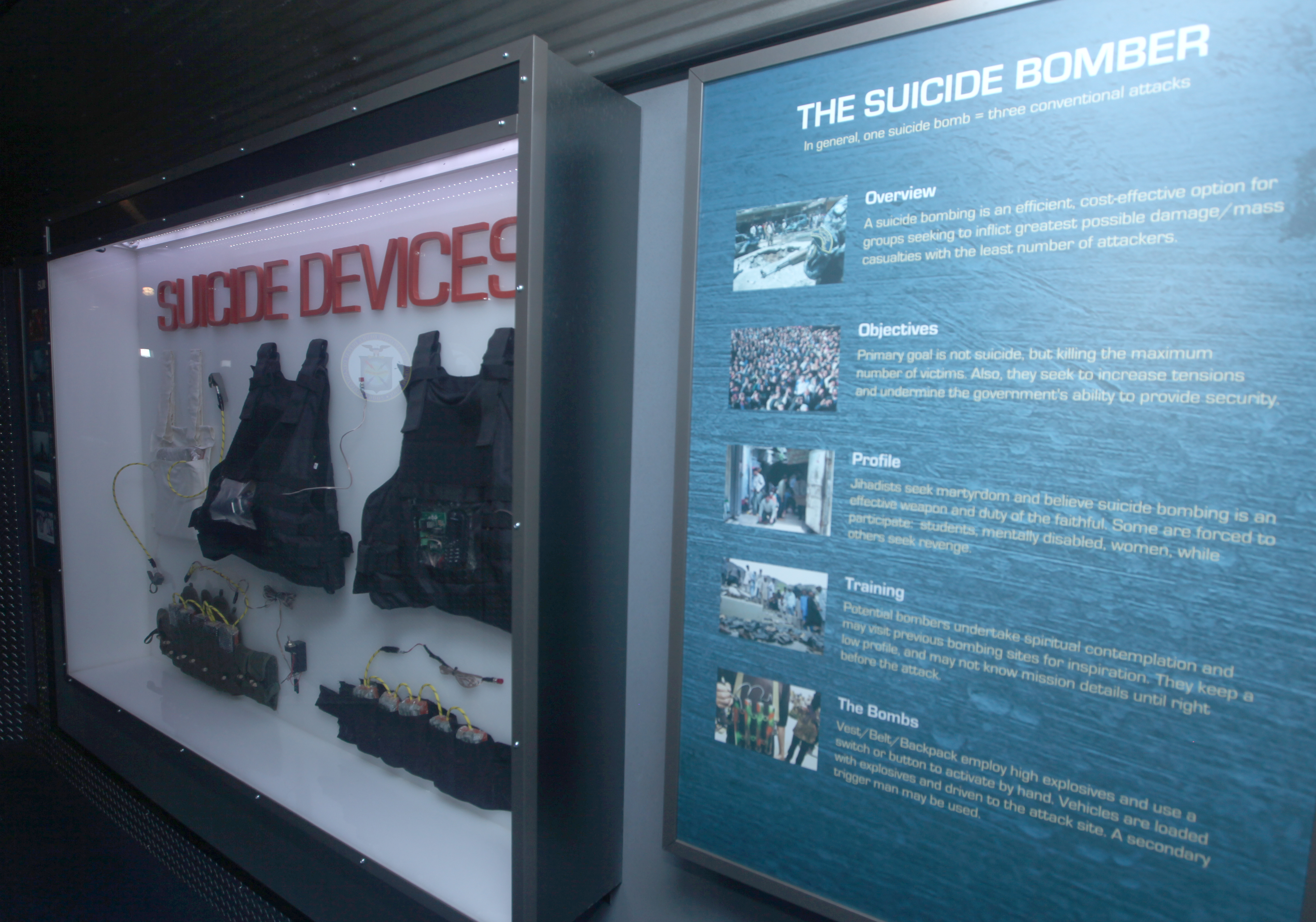
A static display of typical suicide bomb vest devices.

Suicide bombing usually refers to an individual wearing explosives and detonating them to kill others including themselves, the bomber will conceal explosives on and around their person, commonly using a vest, and will use a timer or some other trigger to detonate the explosives. The logic behind such attacks is the belief that an IED delivered by a human has a greater chance of achieving success than any other method of attack. In addition, there is the psychological impact of child soldiers prepared to deliberately sacrifice themselves for their cause.

==== Surgically implanted ====
In May 2012 American counter-terrorism officials leaked their acquisition of documents describing the preparation and use of surgically implanted improvised explosive devices. Security officials referred to bombs being surgically implanted into suicide bombers' "love handles". According to the Daily Mirror UK security officials at MI-6 asserted that female bombers could travel undetected carrying the explosive chemicals in otherwise standard breast implants. The bomber would blow up the implanted explosives by injecting a chemical trigger.

==== Robot/drone ====
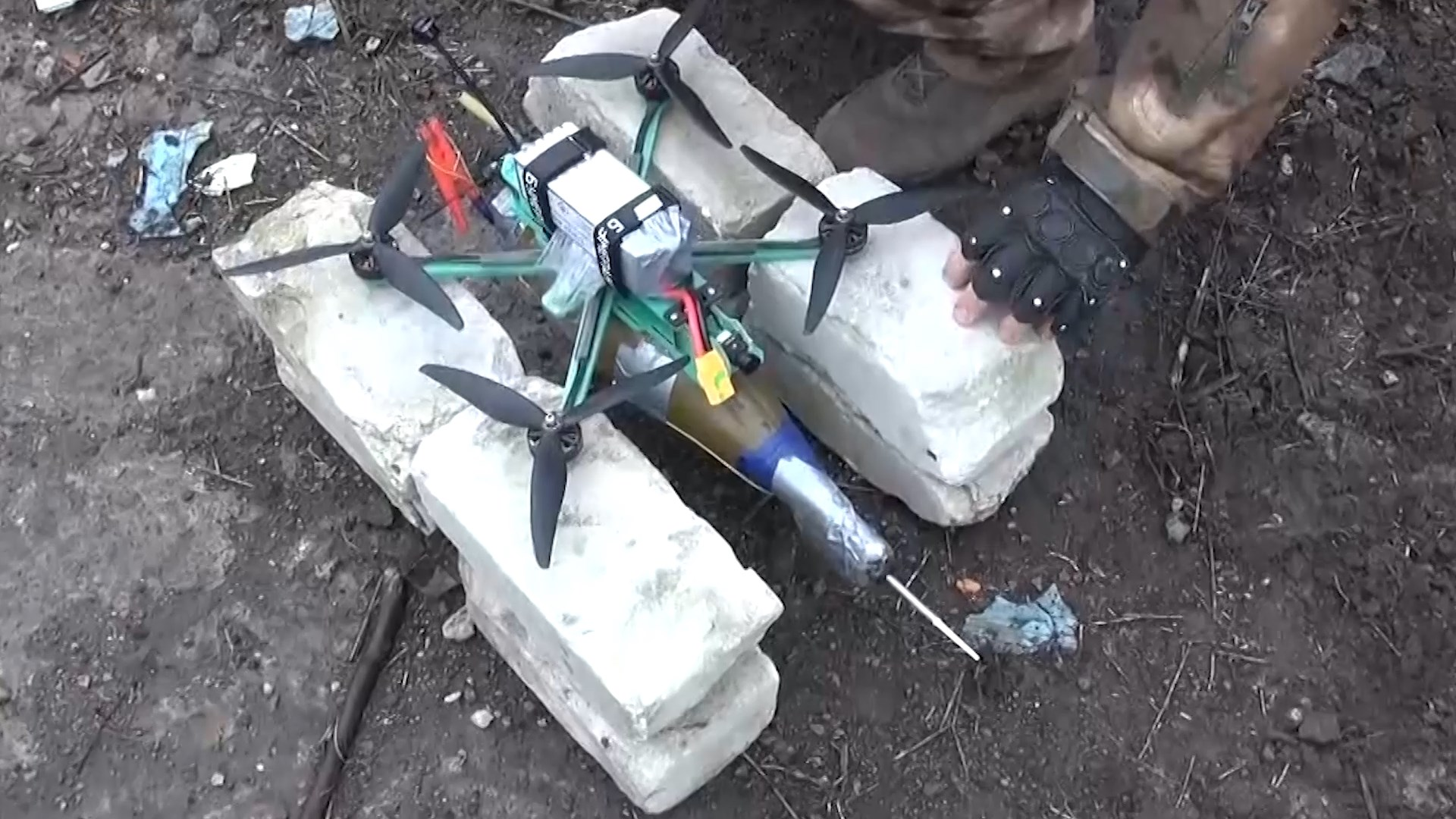
A quadcopter drone modified to carry an explosive device.

Robots could also be used to carry explosives. The first such documented case was during the aftermath of 2016 shooting of Dallas police officers when a bomb disposal robot was used to deliver explosives to kill Micah Xavier Johnson, who was hiding in a place inaccessible to police snipers. As well, drones carrying explosives were used in a suspected assassination attempt against Venezuelan president Nicolás Maduro in 2018. Drug cartels in Mexico have shown the ability to produce drone-borne IEDs.

==== Tunnel ====
ISIS and Al-Nusra have used bombs detonated in tunnels dug under targets.

==== House ====
Among insurgent forces in Iraq was popular the house-borne IED, or HBIED, from the common military practice of clearing houses: insurgents used to rig an entire house to detonate and collapse it shortly after an enemy clearing squad had entered it.

==== Improvised rocket ====
In 2008, rocket-propelled IEDs, dubbed "Improvised Rocket Assisted Munitions" (IRAMs) by the military, came to be employed in numbers against U.S. forces in Iraq. They have been described as propane tanks packed with explosives and powered by 107 mm rockets. New types of IRAMs, including "Volcano IRAMs" and "Elephant Rockets", were used during the Syrian Civil War.

==== Improvised mortar ====
Improvised mortars have been used by many insurgent groups, including during the civil war in Syria and the Boko Haram insurgency. During The Troubles, the IRA used various models of improvised mortars, some of which were nicknamed "barrack busters". Improvised artillery pieces nicknamed "hell cannons" were used by rebel forces during the Syrian Civil War.

=== By trigger mechanism ===
==== Fuse ====
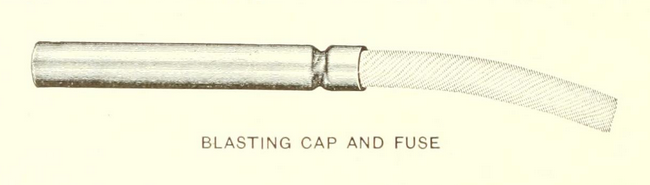
Non-electric blasting cap or detonator crimped to a fuse.

An IED can be initiated by a length of fuse (such as a safety fuse or a visco fuse), which can be attached to a non-electric detonator.

==== Wire ====
Command-wire improvised explosive devices (CWIED) use an electrical firing cable, that affords the user complete control over the device right up until the moment of initiation.

==== Radio ====
The trigger for a radio-controlled improvised explosive device (RCIED) is controlled by radio link. The device is constructed so that the receiver is connected to an electrical firing circuit and the transmitter operated by the perpetrator at a distance. A signal from the transmitter causes the receiver to trigger a firing pulse that operates the switch. Usually the switch fires an initiator; however, the output may also be used to remotely arm an explosive circuit. Often the transmitter and receiver operate on a matched coding system that prevents the RCIED from being initiated by spurious radio frequency signals or jamming. An RCIED can be triggered from any number of different radio-frequency based mechanisms including handheld remote control transmitters, car alarms, wireless door bells, cell phones, pagers and portable two-way radios, including those designed for the CB radio service, UHF PMR446, FRS, and GMRS services.

==== Mobile phone ====
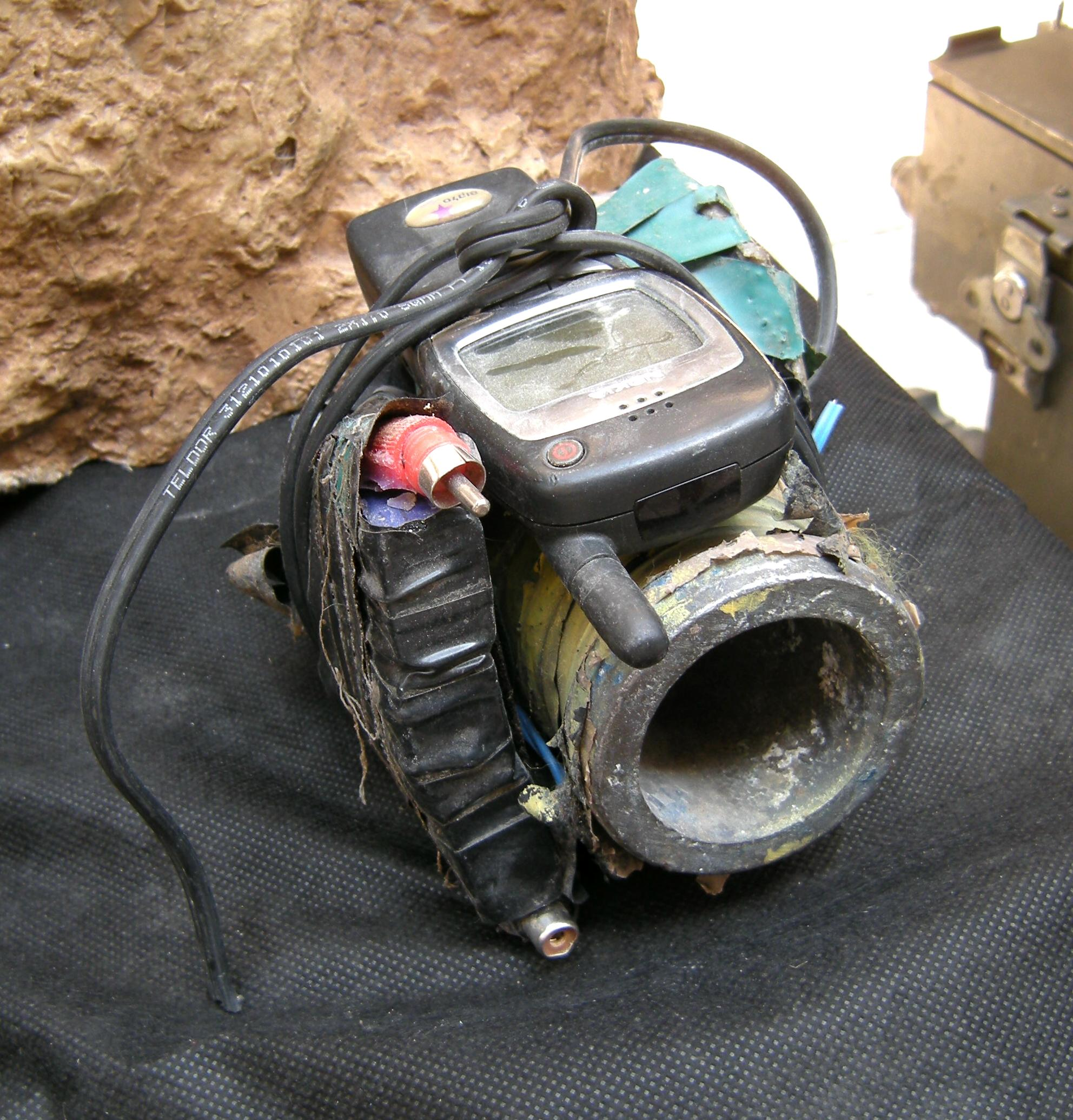
A mobile phone rigged to detonate an IED.

A radio-controlled IED (RCIED) incorporating a mobile phone that is modified and connected to an electrical firing circuit. Mobile phones operate in the UHF band in line of sight with base transceiver station (BTS) antennae sites. In the common scenario, receipt of a paging signal by phone is sufficient to initiate the IED firing circuit.

==== Victim-operated ====
Victim-operated improvised explosive devices (VOIED), also known as booby traps, are designed to function upon contact with a victim. VOIED switches are often well hidden from the victim or disguised as innocuous everyday objects. They are operated by means of movement. Switching methods include tripwire, pressure mats, spring-loaded release, push, pull or tilt. Common forms of VOIED include the under-vehicle IED (UVIED), improvised landmines, and mail bombs.

==== Infrared ====
The British accused Iran and Hezbollah of teaching Iraqi fighters to use infrared light beams to trigger IEDs. As the occupation forces became more sophisticated in interrupting radio signals around their convoys, the insurgents adapted their triggering methods. In some cases, when a more advanced method was disrupted, the insurgents regressed to using uninterruptible means, such as hard wires from the IED to detonator; however, this method is much harder to effectively conceal. It later emerged however, that these "advanced" IEDs were actually old IRA technology. The infrared beam method was perfected by the IRA in the early 1990s after it acquired the technology from a botched undercover British Army operation. Many of the IEDs being used against the invading coalition forces in Iraq were originally developed by the British Army who unintentionally passed the information on to the IRA. The IRA taught their techniques to the Palestine Liberation Organization and the knowledge spread to Iraq.

== Counterefforts ==
Counter-IED efforts are done primarily by military, law enforcement, diplomatic, financial, and intelligence communities and involve a comprehensive approach to countering the threat networks that employ IEDs, not just efforts to defeat the devices themselves.

=== Detection and disarmament ===
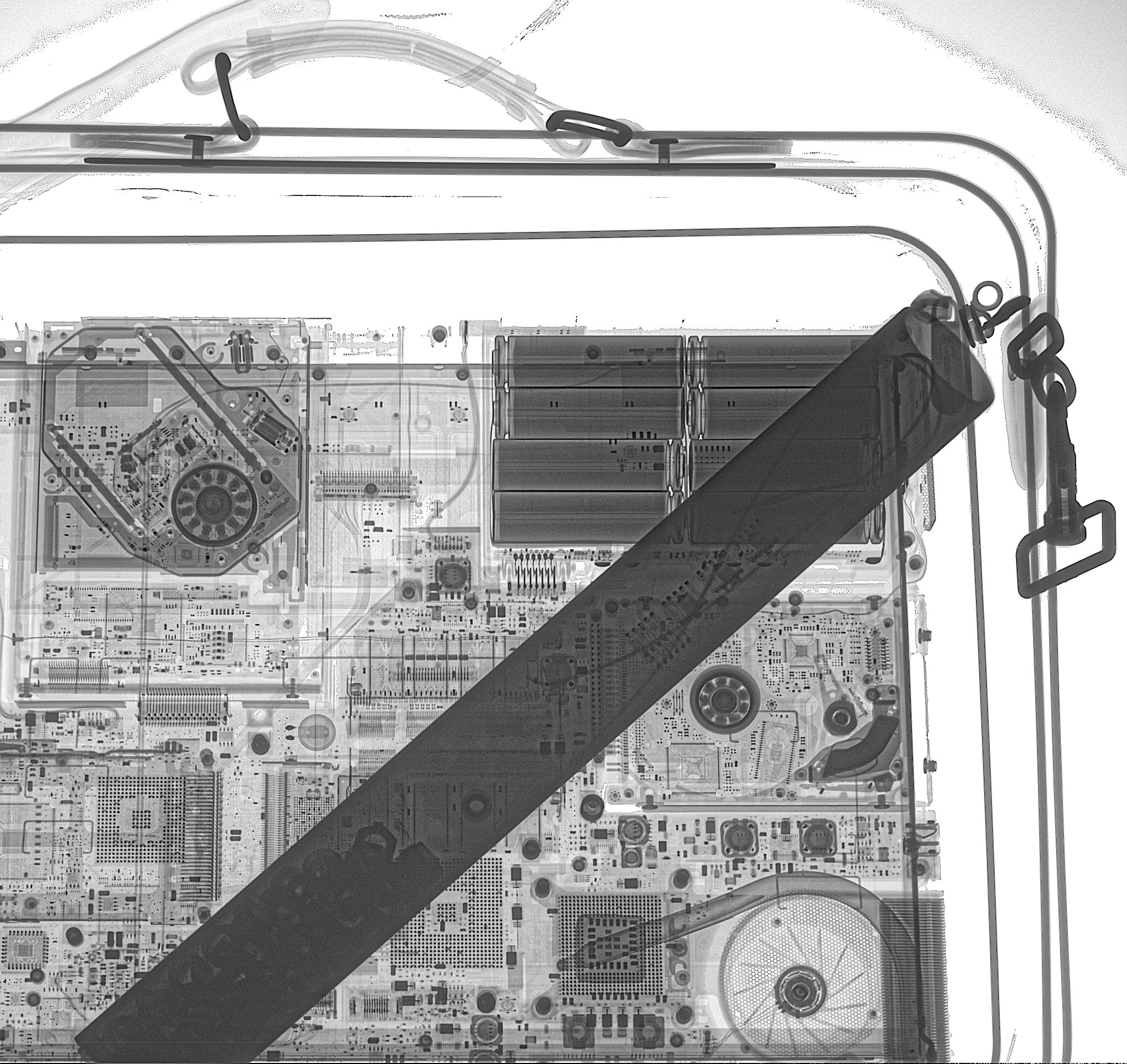
Radiography of a suitcase, showing a pipe bomb and a laptop.

Because the components of these devices are being used in a manner not intended by their manufacturer, and because the method of producing the explosion is limited only by the science and imagination of the perpetrator, it is not possible to follow a step-by-step guide to detect and disarm a device that an individual has only recently developed. As such, explosive ordnance disposal (IEDD) operators must be able to fall back on their extensive knowledge of the first principles of explosives and ammunition, to try and deduce what the perpetrator has done, and only then to render it safe and dispose of or exploit the device.

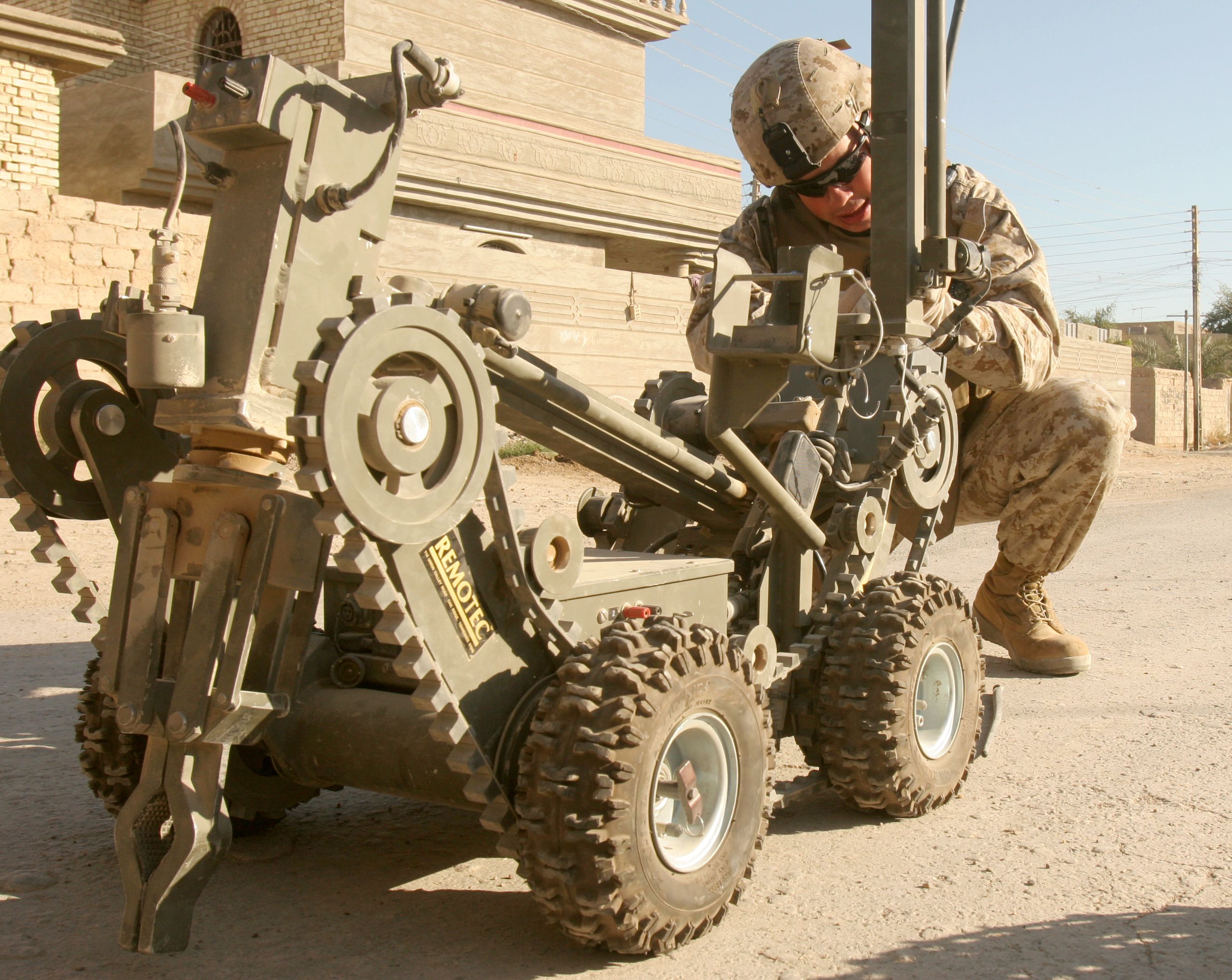
A U.S. Marine in Iraq, shown with a robot used for disposal of IEDs.

Beyond this, as the stakes increase and IEDs are emplaced not only to achieve the direct effect, but to deliberately target IEDD operators and cordon personnel, the IEDD operator needs to have a deep understanding of tactics to ensure they are neither setting up any of their team or the cordon troops for an attack, nor walking into one themselves. The presence of chemical, biological, radiological, or nuclear (CBRN) material in an IED requires additional precautions. As with other missions, the EOD operator provides the area commander with an assessment of the situation and of support needed to complete the mission.

Military and law enforcement personnel from around the world have developed a number of render-safe procedures (RSPs) to deal with IEDs. RSPs may be developed as a result of direct experience with devices or by applied research designed to counter the threat. The supposed effectiveness of IED jamming systems, including vehicle- and personally-mounted systems, has caused IED technology to essentially regress to command-wire detonation methods. These are physical connections between the detonator and explosive device and cannot be jammed. However, these types of IEDs are more difficult to emplace quickly, and are more readily detected.

Military forces and law enforcement from India, Canada, United Kingdom, Israel, Spain, and the United States are at the forefront of counter-IED efforts, as all have direct experience in dealing with IEDs used against them in conflict or terrorist attacks. From the research and development side, programs such as the new Canadian Unmanned Systems Challenge will bring student groups together to invent an unmanned device to both locate IEDs and pinpoint the insurgents.

== Historical use ==
The fougasse was improvised for centuries, eventually inspiring factory-made land mines. Ernst Jünger mentions in his war memoir the systematic use of IEDs and booby traps to cover the retreat of German troops at the Somme region during World War I. Another early example of coordinated large-scale use of IEDs was the Belarusian Rail War launched by Belarusian guerrillas against the Germans during World War II. Both command-detonated and delayed-fuse IEDs were used to derail thousands of German trains during 1943–1944.

=== Afghanistan ===
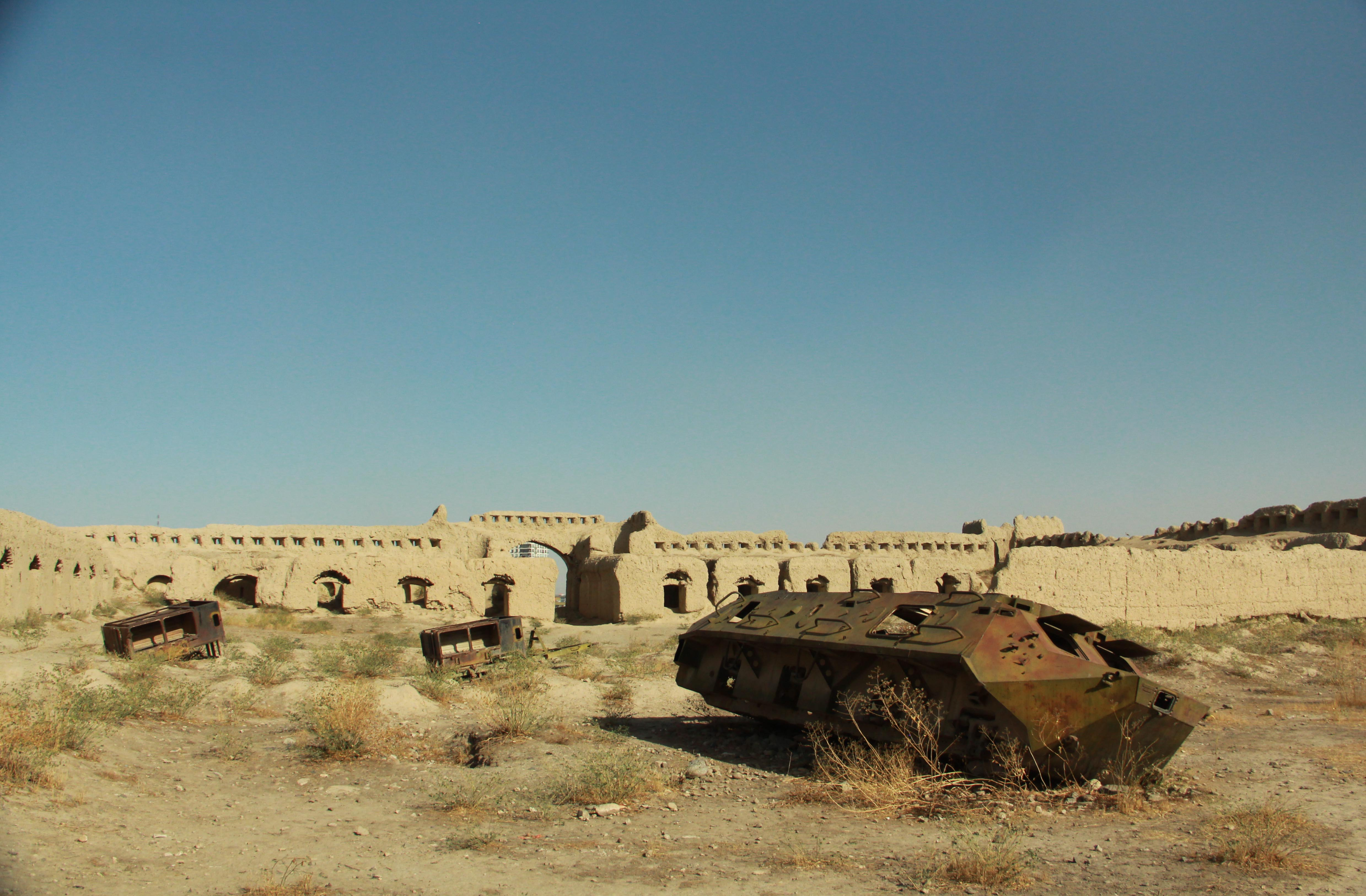
A Soviet BTR-60, destroyed in Afghanistan.

Starting six months before the invasion of Afghanistan by the USSR on 27 December 1979, the Afghan Mujahideen were supplied by the CIA, among others, with large quantities of military supplies. Among those supplies were many types of anti-tank mines. The insurgents often removed the explosives from several foreign anti-tank mines, and combined the explosives in tin cooking-oil cans for a more powerful blast. By combining the explosives from several mines and placing them in tin cans, the insurgents made them more powerful, but sometimes also easier to detect by Soviet sappers using mine detectors. After an IED was detonated, the insurgents often used direct-fire weapons such as machine guns and rocket-propelled grenades to continue the attack.

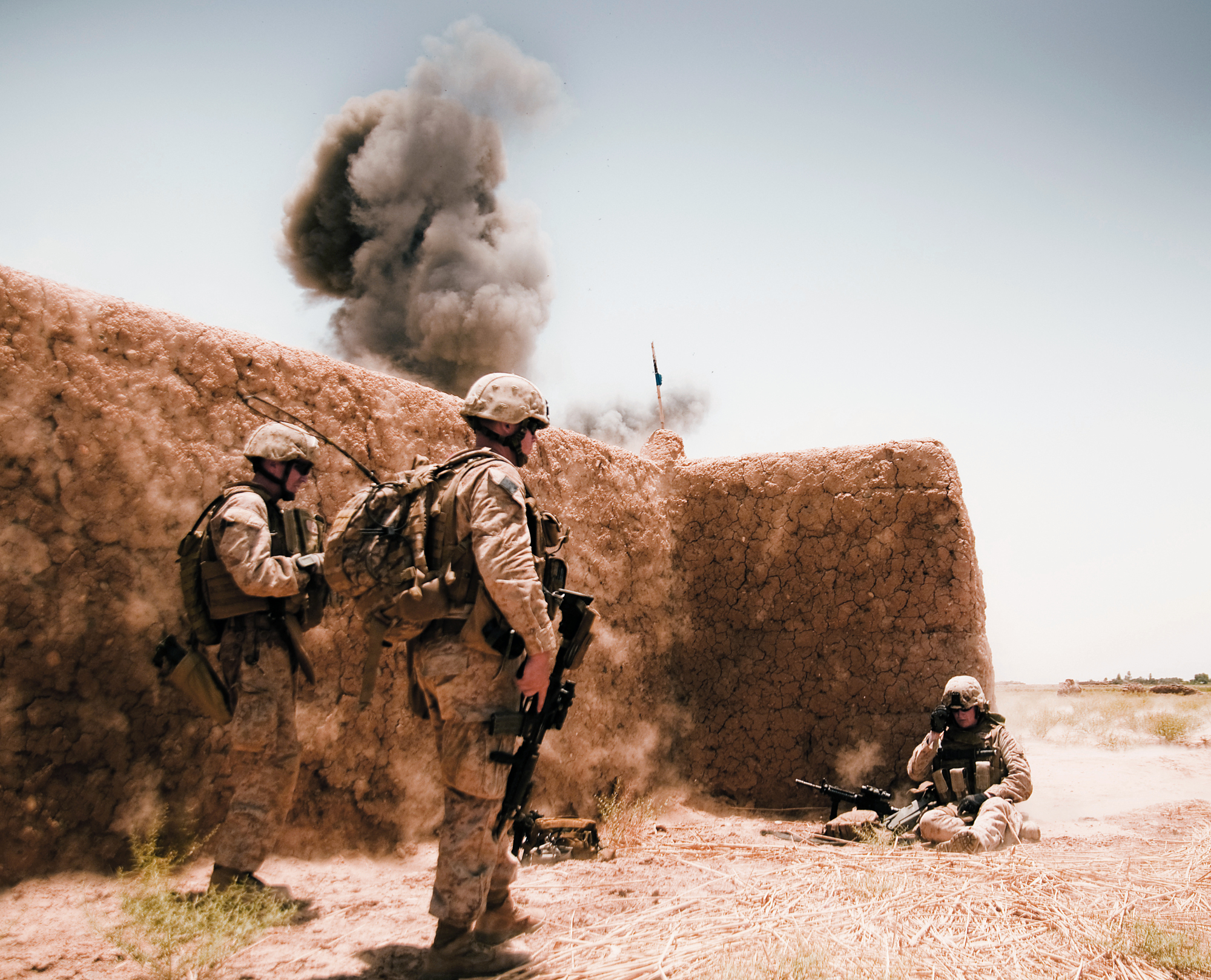
U.S. Marines with Explosive Ordnance Disposal (EOD) destroy an improvised explosive device cache in southern Afghanistan (June 2010).

Afghan insurgents operating far from the border with Pakistan did not have a ready supply of foreign anti-tank mines. They preferred to make IEDs from Soviet unexploded ordnance. The devices were rarely triggered by pressure fuzes. They were almost always remotely detonated. During the War in Afghanistan (2001–2021), the Taliban and its supporters used IEDs against NATO and Afghan military and civilian vehicles. This was the most common method of attack against NATO forces, with IED attacks that increased consistently year on year.

IEDs used by insurgent groups during the 2001–2021 Afghanistan War caused over 66% of coalition casualties.

A brigade commander said that sniffer dogs were the most reliable way of detecting IEDs. However, statistical evidence gathered by the US Army Maneuver Support Center at Fort Leonard Wood, MO showed that the dogs were not the most effective means of detecting IEDs. The U.S. Army's 10th Mountain Division was the first unit to introduce explosive detection dogs in southern Afghanistan. In less than two years the dogs discovered 15 tons of illegal munitions, IEDs, and weapons.

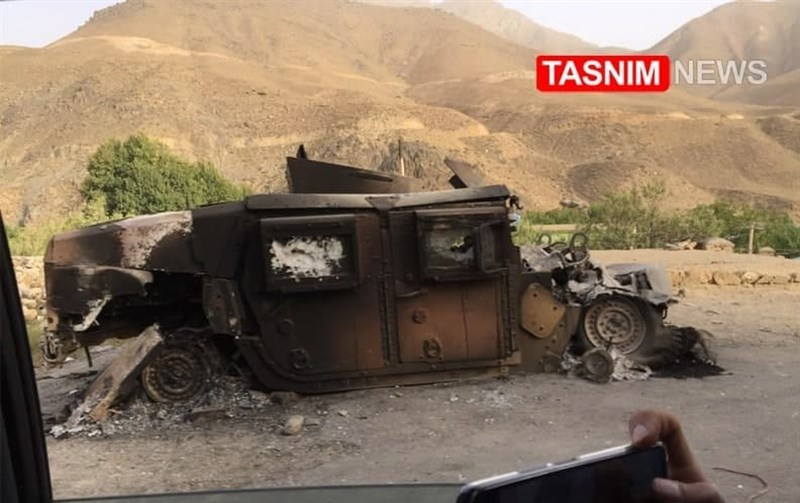
A U.S. Humvee, destroyed in the Afghan province of Panjshir.

In July 2012 it was reported that "sticky bombs", magnetically adhesive IEDs that were prevalent in the Iraq War, showed up in Afghanistan. By 2021 there was at least one sticky bomb attack a day in Kabul. They are used in both traditional assassinations and targeted killings and as terror weapons against the population at large.

In November 2013 one of the largest IEDs constructed was intercepted near Gardez City in Eastern Afghanistan. The 61,000 pounds of explosives was hidden under what appeared to be piles of wood. By comparison, the truck bomb that all but razed the Alfred P. Murrah Federal Building in Oklahoma City and killed 168 people in 1995 weighed less than 5,000 pounds. A United States Army Corps of Engineers officer assigned to the nearby FOB Lightning analyzed the potential blast damage, which resulted in closing FOB Goode due to its proximity to the highway.

ISAF troops stationed in Afghanistan and other IED prone areas of operation used to "BIP" (blow in place) IEDs and other explosives that were considered too dangerous to defuse.

=== Cameroon ===
IEDs are being used by Ambazonian separatists in the ongoing Anglophone Crisis.

=== Egypt ===
IEDs are being used by insurgents against government forces during the insurgency in Egypt (2013–present) and the Sinai insurgency.

=== India ===
IEDs are being used by Maoists in India in their ongoing insurgency.

On 13 July 2011, three IEDs were used by the Insurgency in Jammu and Kashmir to carry out a coordinated attack on the city of Mumbai, killing 19 people and injuring 130 more.

On 21 February 2013, two IEDs were used to carry out bombings in the Indian city of Hyderabad. The bombs exploded in Dilsukhnagar, a crowded shopping area of the city, within 150 metres of each other.

On 17 April 2013, two kilos of explosives used in Bangalore bomb blast at Malleshwaram area, leaving 16 injured and no fatalities. Intelligence sources have said the bomb was an Improvised Explosive Device or IED.

On 21 May 2014, Indinthakarai village supporters of the Kudankulam Nuclear Power Plant were targeted by opponents using over half a dozen crude "country-made bombs". It was further reported that there had been at least four similar bombings in Tamil Nadu during the preceding year.

On 28 December 2014, a minor explosion took place near the Coconut Grove restaurant at Church Street in Bangalore on Sunday around 8:30 pm. One woman was killed and another injured in the blast.

During the 2016 Pathankot attack, several casualties came from IEDs.

On 14 February 2019 in 2019 Pulwama attack, several casualties were reported due to IED blast.

On 29 October 2023, a series of IED explosions were used at a Jehovah's Witnesses Convention in Kalamassery, India which killed five women, two men and a child.

=== Iraq ===
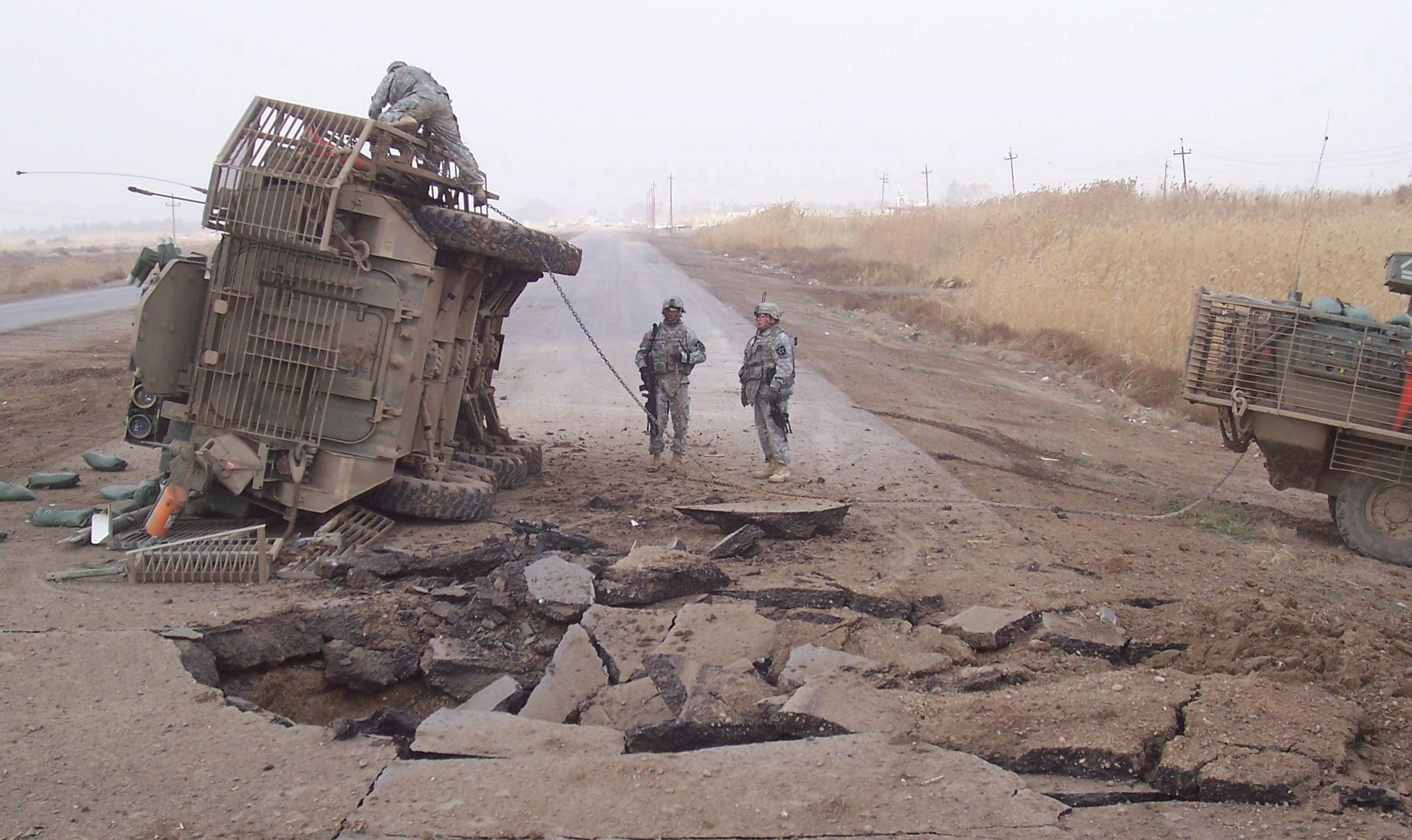
A U.S. Stryker lies on its side following a buried IED blast in Iraq (2007).

In the Iraq War (2003–2011), insurgents used IEDs extensively against U.S.-led forces, and by the end of 2007 they were responsible for approximately 64% of coalition deaths in Iraq.

Since the detonation of the first IED in Iraq in 2003, more than 81,000 IED attacks occurred in the country, killing and wounding 21,200 Americans.

Beginning in July 2003, the Iraqi insurgency used IEDs to target invading coalition vehicles. According to The Washington Post, 64% of U.S. deaths in Iraq occurred due to IEDs. A French study showed that in Iraq, from March 2003 to November 2006, on a global 3,070 deaths in the US-led invading coalition soldiers, 1,257 were caused by IEDs, i.e. 41%: that is to say more than in the "normal fights" (1027 dead, 34%). Insurgents used IEDs to target not only invading coalition vehicles but Iraqi police as well.

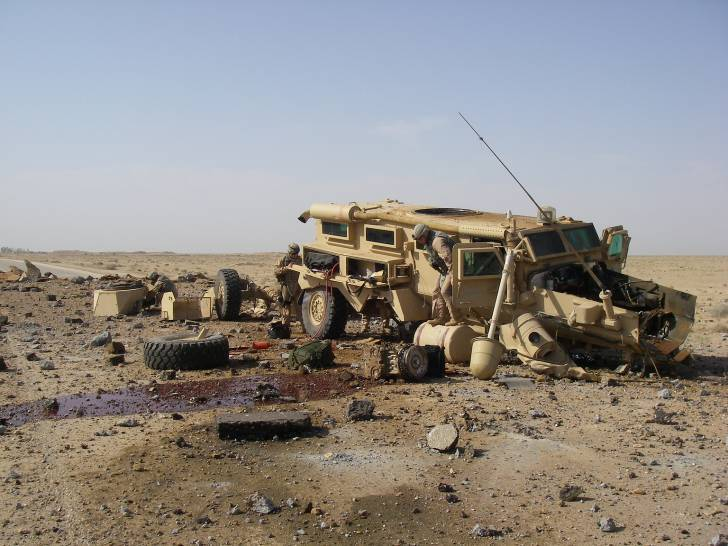
A U.S. Cougar which was struck by an approximately 90–136 kg (198–300 lb) directed charge IED during the Anbar campaign; the crew of the MRAP survived uninjured (September 2007).

Common locations for placing these bombs on the ground included animal carcasses, soft drink cans, and boxes. Typically, they exploded underneath or to the side of the vehicle to cause the maximum amount of damage. However, as vehicle armour was improved on military vehicles, insurgents began placing IEDs in elevated positions such as on road signs, utility poles, or trees, to hit less protected areas.

IEDs in Iraq may have been made with artillery or mortar shells or with varying amounts of bulk or homemade explosives. Early during the Iraq war, the bulk explosives were often obtained from stored munitions bunkers to include stripping landmines of their explosives.

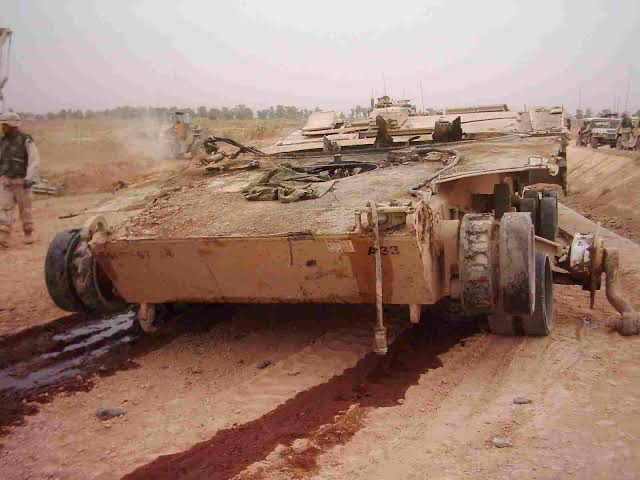
A U.S. M1 Abrams tank, destroyed in Iraq by an IED; the detonation launched the turret approximately 50 yards away from the hull, resulting in the death of two soldiers and the left leg amputation of a third one (2003).

Despite the increased armor, IEDs were killing military personnel and civilians with greater frequency. May 2007 was one of the deadliest month for IED attacks, with a reported 89 of the 129 invading coalition casualties coming from an IED attack. According to the Pentagon, 250,000 tons (out of 650,000 tons total) of Iraqi heavy ordnance were looted, providing a large supply of ammunition for the insurgents.

In October 2005, the UK government charged that Iran was supplying insurgents with the technological know-how to make shaped charge IEDs. Both Iranian and Iraqi government officials denied the allegations.

During the Iraqi Civil War (2014–2017), ISIL made extensive use of suicide VBIEDs, often driven by children, elderly and disabled.

=== Ireland and the United Kingdom ===
From 1912 to 1914, the Suffragettes utilised IEDs in the Suffragette bombing and arson campaign.

During the Irish War of Independence (1919–1921) the Irish Republican Army, nowaday referred to as the "old IRA", used improvised explosive devices against the British armed forces.

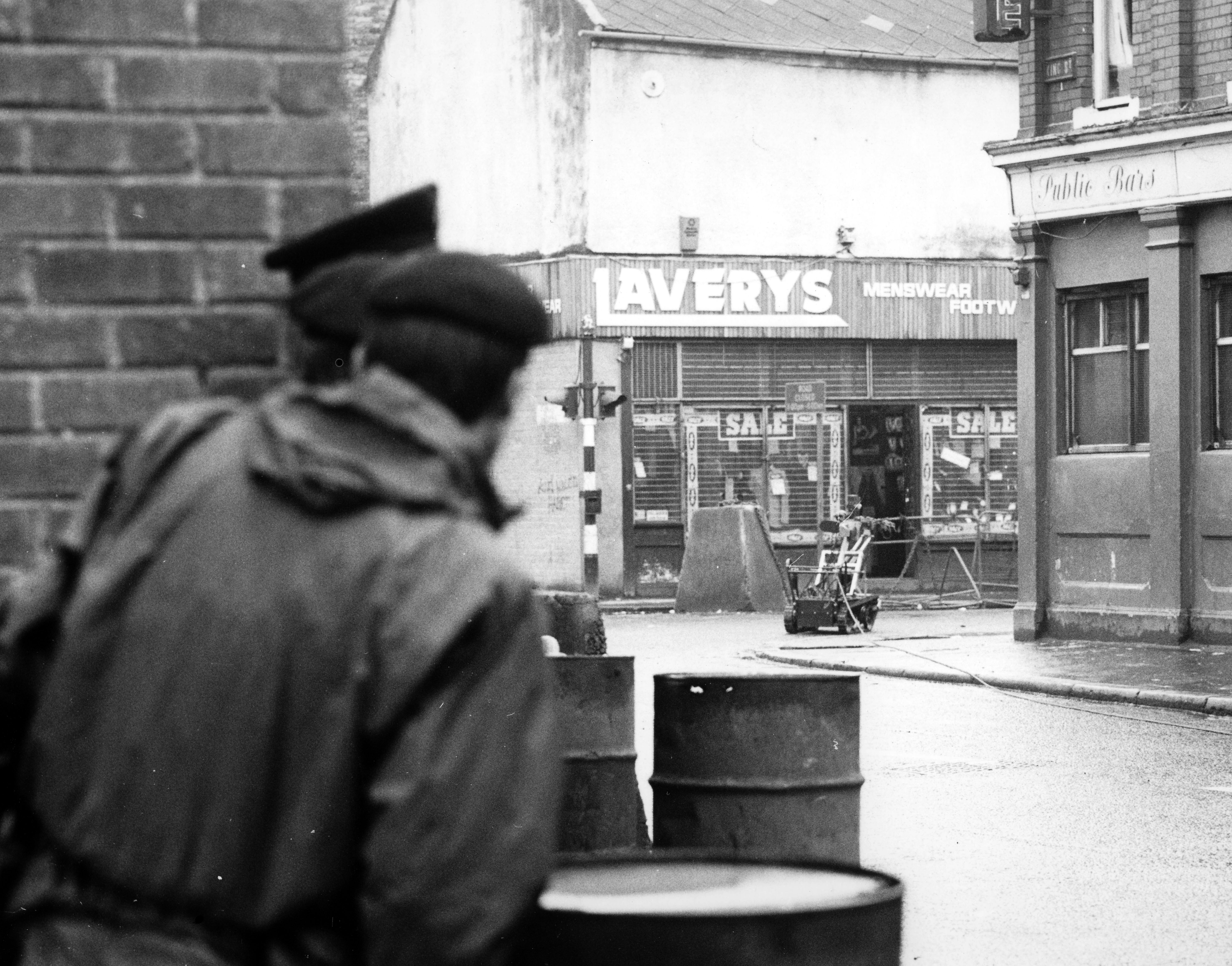
A Wheelbarrow counter-IED robot on the streets of Northern Ireland (1978).

Throughout The Troubles, the Provisional Irish Republican Army made extensive use of IEDs in their 1969–97 campaign, much of which were made in the Republic of Ireland. They used "barrack buster" mortars and remote-controlled IEDs. Members of the IRA developed and counter-developed devices and tactics. IRA bombs became highly sophisticated, featuring anti-handling devices such as a mercury tilt switch or microswitches. These devices would detonate the bomb if it was moved in any way. Typically, the safety-arming device used was a clockwork Memopark timer, which armed the bomb up to 60 minutes after it was placed by completing an electrical circuit supplying power to the anti-handling device. Depending on the particular design (e.g., boobytrapped briefcase or car bomb) an independent electrical circuit supplied power to a conventional timer set for the intended time delay, e.g. 40 minutes. However, some electronic delays developed by IRA technicians could be set to accurately detonate a bomb weeks after it was hidden, which is what happened in the Brighton hotel bomb attack of 1984. Initially, bombs were detonated either by timer or by simple command wire. Later, bombs could be detonated by radio control. Initially, simple servos from radio-controlled aircraft were used to close the electrical circuit and supply power to the detonator. After the British developed jammers, IRA technicians introduced devices that required a sequence of pulsed radio codes to arm and detonate them. These were harder to jam.

The IRA as well as Ulster loyalist paramilitaries have also utilized less sophisticated devices, such as homemade anti-personnel hand grenades thrown at the target: such grenades were pipe bombs and nail bombs; other types were identified as "blast bombs" (offensive grenades with a limited danger-zone). IRA technicians also developed a homemade anti-tank hand grenade, equipped with a shaped charge warhead, called "Improvised Anti-Armour Grenade" (IAAG).

A British Army vehicle destroyed during the IRA ambush on Warrenpoint (27 August 1979).

Roadside bombs were extensively used by the IRA. Typically, a roadside bomb was placed in a drain or culvert along a rural road and detonated by remote control when British security forces vehicles were passing, as with the case of the 1979 Warrenpoint ambush; as a result of the use of these bombs, the British military stopped transport by road in areas such as South Armagh, and used helicopter transport instead to avoid the danger.

Most IEDs used commercial or homemade explosives made in the Republic of Ireland, with ingredients such as gelignite and ANFO either stolen in construction sites or provided for by supporters in the South, although the use of Semtex-H smuggled in from Libya in the 1980s was also common from the mid-1980s onward. Bomb Disposal teams from 321 EOD manned by Ammunition Technicians were deployed in those areas to deal with the IED threat. The IRA also used secondary devices to catch British reinforcements sent in after an initial blast as occurred in the Warrenpoint Ambush. Between 1970 and 2005, the IRA detonated 19,000 IEDs in the Northern Ireland and Britain, an average of one every 17 hours for three and a half decades, arguably making it «the biggest terrorist bombing campaign in history».

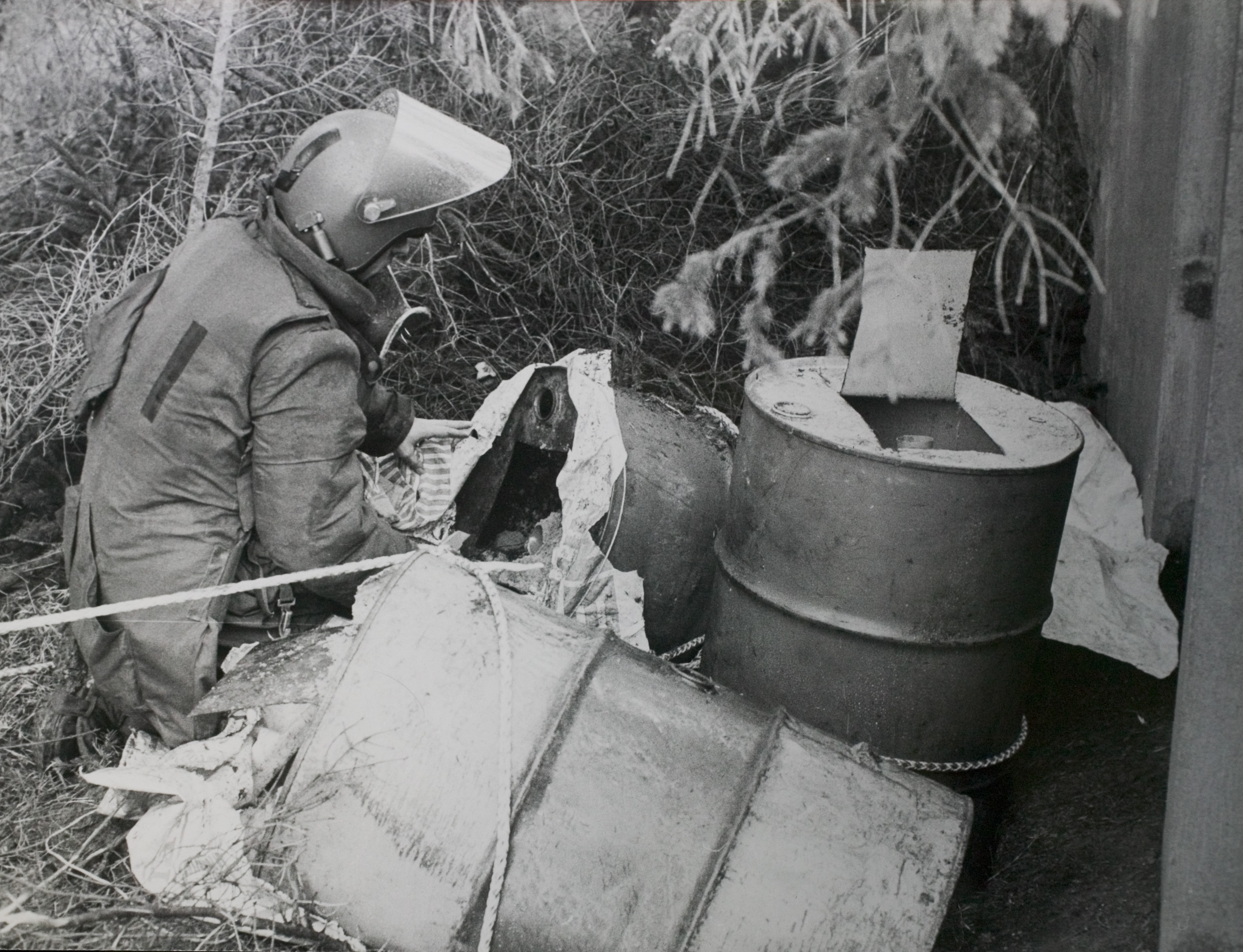
Oil-drum roadside IED removed from culvert (1984).

In the early 1970s, at the height of the IRA campaign, the British Army unit tasked with rendering safe IEDs, 321 EOD, sustained significant casualties while engaged in bomb disposal operations; this mortality rate was far higher than other high risk occupations such as deep sea diving, and a careful review was made of how men were selected for EOD operations; the review recommended bringing in psychometric testing of soldiers to ensure those chosen had the correct mental preparation for high risk bomb disposal duties.

The IRA came up with ever more sophisticated designs and deployments of IEDs. Booby Trap or Victim Operated IEDs (VOIEDs), became commonplace. The IRA engaged in an ongoing battle to gain the upper hand in electronic warfare with remote controlled devices. The rapid changes in development led 321 EOD to employ specialists from DERA (now Dstl, an agency of the MOD), the Royal Signals, and Military Intelligence. This approach by the British army to fighting the IRA in Northern Ireland led to the development and use of most of the modern weapons, equipment and techniques now used by EOD Operators throughout the rest of the world today.

The bomb disposal operations were led by Ammunition Technicians and Ammunition Technical Officers from 321 EOD, and were trained at the Felix Centre at the Army School of Ammunition.

=== Israel ===
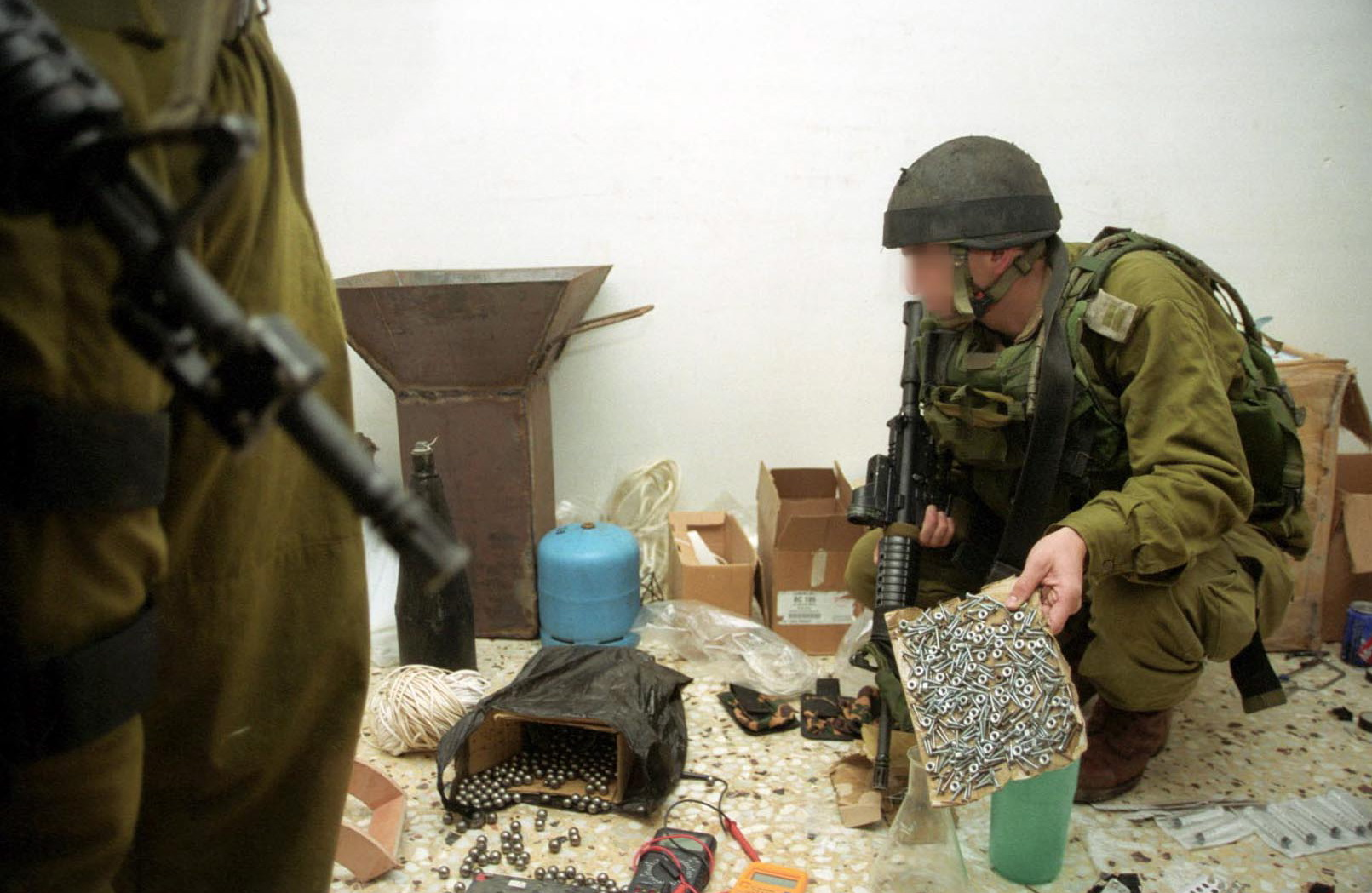
A bomb-making workshop discovered by IDF, containing a large collection of nuts, bolts, and ball bearings to be used as shrapnel (2002).

On August 27, 2023, Israeli security forces successfully foiled an attempt to smuggle Iranian-made explosives into Israel from Jordan. The thwarted smuggling operation in the Jordan Valley aimed to supply clandestine groups in the West Bank with explosives. Counter-smuggling efforts along the border led to increased seizures of weapons and explosive devices.

IEDs are being used by Hamas (Al-Qassam Brigades) and other Palestinian militant groups during the Gaza–Israel conflict, and more in general during the Israeli–Palestinian conflict; such devices also include shaped charges directly applied to the targets, and explosively formed penetrators/projectiles (EFPs).

=== Lebanon ===
The Lebanese National Resistance Front, the Popular Front for the Liberation of Palestine, other clandestine groups in Lebanon, and later Hezbollah, made extensive use of IEDs to fight against Israeli forces after Israel's invasion of Lebanon in 1982. Israel withdrew from Beirut, Northern Lebanon, and Mount Lebanon in 1985, whilst maintaining its occupation of Southern Lebanon. Hezbollah frequently used IEDs to attack Israeli military forces in this area up until the Israeli withdrawal, and the end of the invasion of Lebanon in May 2000.

One such bomb killed Israeli Brigadier General Erez Gerstein on 28 February 1999, the highest-ranking Israeli to die in Lebanon since Yekutiel Adam's death in 1982.

Also in the 2006 War in Lebanon, a Merkava Mark II tank was hit by a pre-positioned Hezbollah IED, killing all 4 IDF servicemen on board, the first of two IEDs to damage a Merkava tank.

=== Libya ===
Homemade IEDs are used extensively during the post-civil war violence in Libya, mostly in the city of Benghazi against police stations, cars or foreign embassies.

=== Nepal ===
IEDs were widely used in the 10-years long Nepalese Civil War by the Nepalese People's Liberation Army (PLA), the armed wing of the Communist Party of Nepal (Maoist). PLA fighters used rifles captured from the police and a variety of IEDs. The PLA lacked mortars and crew-served weapons, and thus employed human-waves attacks of "martyrs" to break enemy defenses, resulting in heavy casualties. PLA regulars had excellent infantry skills, possibly indicating foreign training. IEDs were the main weapon the insurgents used against government forces, typically causing 35 percent of the deaths among Royal Nepal Army (RNA) troops and 50 percent of injuries. Simple IEDs included hand-thrown "socket bombs" made with black powder and shrapnel, and larger bombs made with steel pipes and pressure cockers detonated by wire or remote control. The effectiveness of the IED campaign also suggested foreign training, probably from Indian Maoists groups.

=== Nigeria ===
Boko Haram are using IEDs during their insurgency.

=== Pakistan ===
Taliban and other insurgent groups use IEDs against police, military, security forces, and civilian targets.

=== Russia ===
IEDs were used by the Chechen insurgency following the Second Chechen War.

In 1999 Russian apartment bombings, multiple IEDs containing over 10 tons of ammonal and RDX-based plastic explosives were used. 246 were killed in a building collapse and more than 1000 were injured.

=== Somalia ===
Al Shabaab is using IEDs during the Somali Civil War.

=== Sri Lanka ===
IEDs were used frequently by the Liberation Tigers of Tamil Eelam (LTTE) in Sri Lanka during the Sri Lankan Civil War.

=== Syria ===
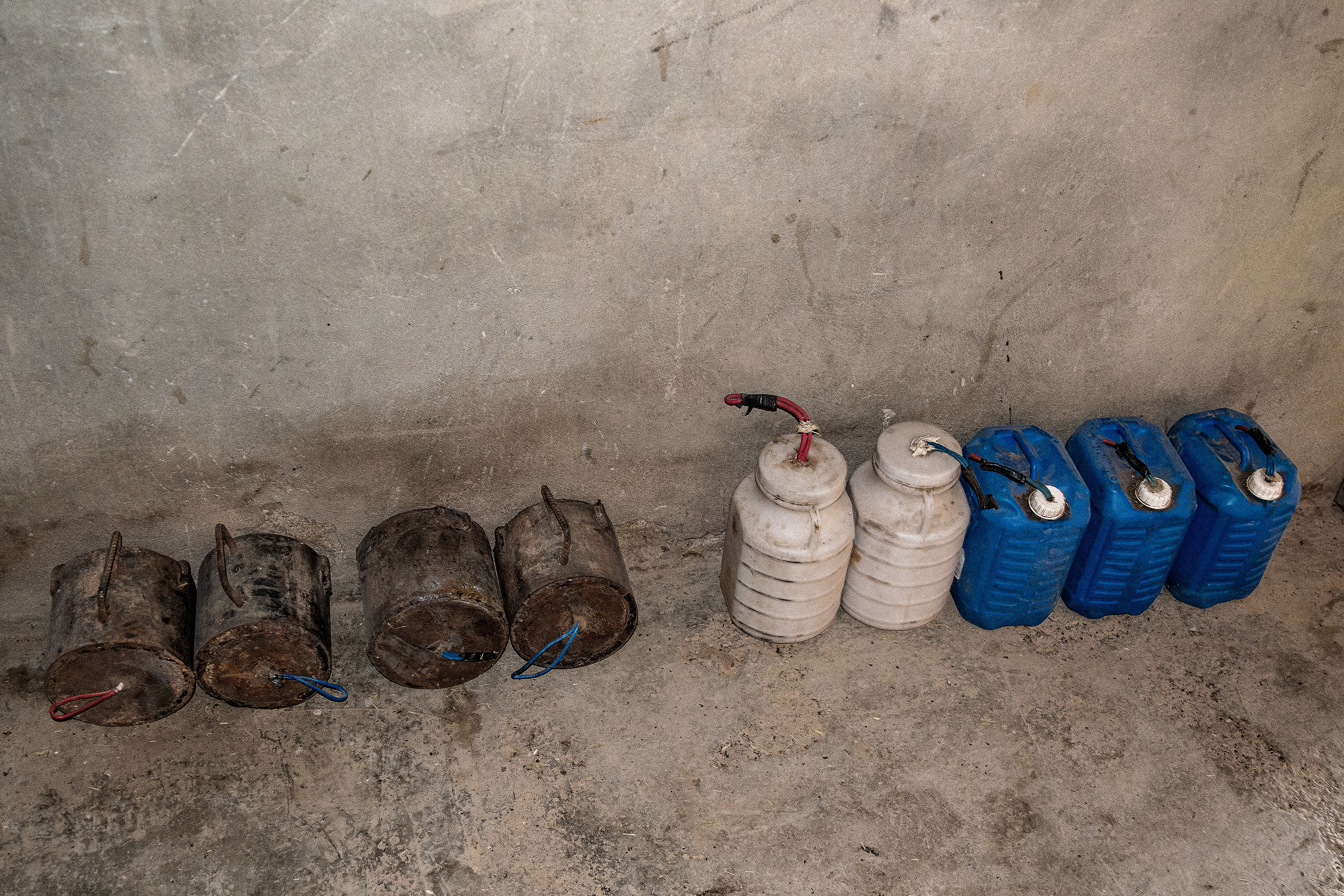
Captured IEDs from a cache left behind, in Syria, by the Islamic State of Iraq and the Levant (26 January 2019).

During the Syrian Civil War, militant insurgents were using IEDs to attack buses, cars, trucks, tanks and military convoys. Additionally, the Syrian Air Force has used barrel bombs to attack targets in cities and other areas. Such barrel bombs consist of barrels filled with high explosives, oil, and shrapnel, and are dropped from helicopters.

Along with mines and IEDs, ISIL also used VBIEDs in Syria, including during 2017 Aleppo suicide car bombing. See also: Improvised artillery in the Syrian civil war.

=== Uganda ===
On 16 November 2021, suicide bombers set off two powerful explosions in the center of Uganda's capital Kampala during rush hour in an attack later claimed by Islamic State. There have been a number of bomb explosions in 2021. In October, a 20-year-old waitress was killed after a device, left in a shopping bag, detonated in a bar in the city. Days later several people were injured when a suicide bomber blew himself up in a bus near Kampala.

=== United States ===
Numerous IEDs were built and disseminated by the Unabomber – nickname of Theodore Kaczynski – starting from the late 1970s.

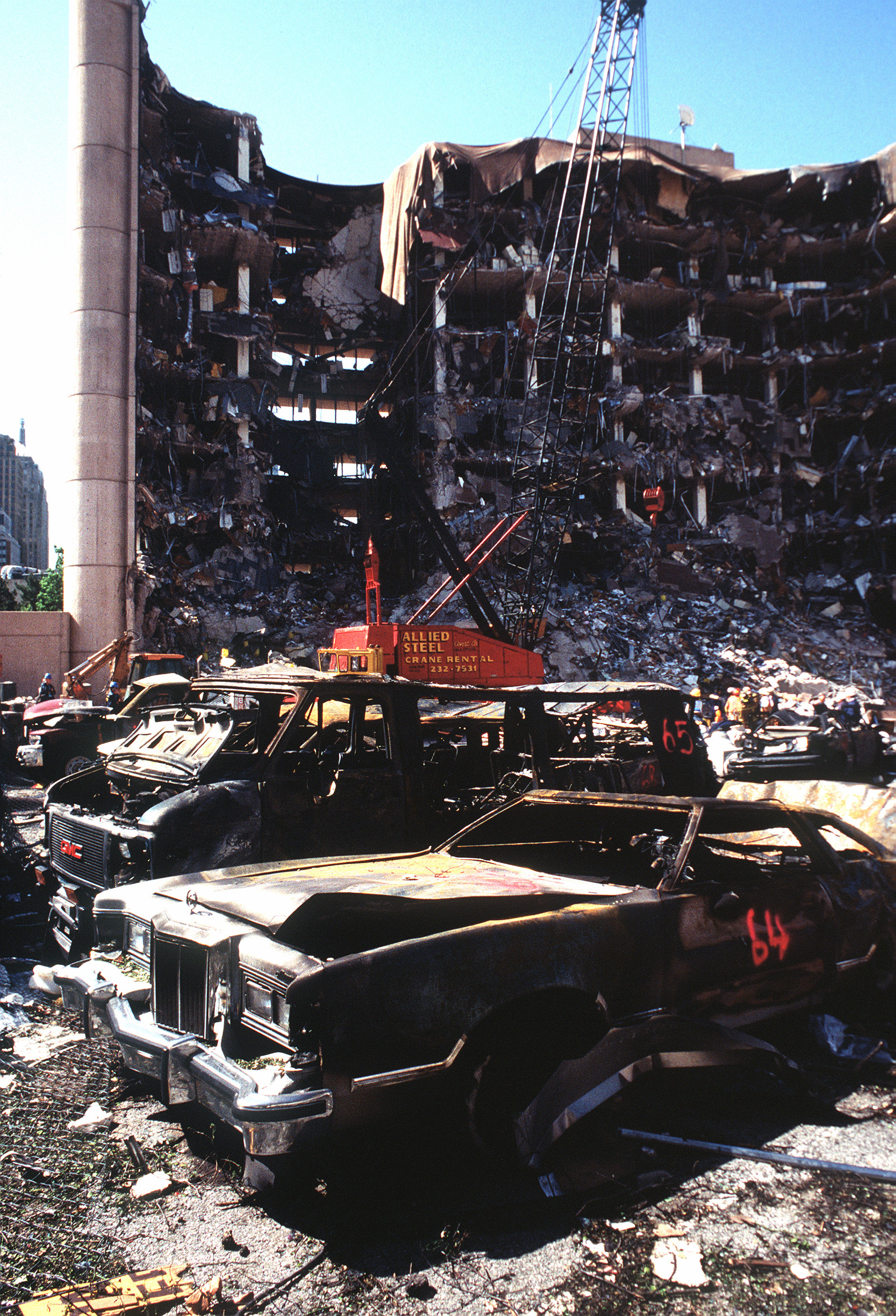
The Alfred P. Murrah Federal Building two days after the Oklahoma City bombing (21 April 1995).

In the 1995 Oklahoma City bombing, Timothy McVeigh and Terry Nichols built an IED with ammonium nitrate fertilizer, nitromethane, and stolen commercial explosives in a rental truck, with sandbags used to concentrate the explosive force in the desired direction. McVeigh detonated it next to the Alfred P. Murrah Federal Building, killing 168 people, 19 of whom were children.

High school students Eric Harris and Dylan Klebold prepared multiple IEDs during the Columbine High School massacre on 20 April 1999. In addition to a stockpile of firearms, Harris and Klebold had secured propane tanks and converted them into bombs, placing them in the school cafeteria. They had also constructed several car bombs. In all, Harris and Klebold had prepared 99 explosive devices, part of which was designed to attack first responders and news reporters responding to the initial bombing, as well as survivors. When the IEDs they previously placed failed to detonate, Harris and Klebold began shooting students outside of the high school, moving in to the school and shooting most of their victims in the school's library. In all, Harris and Klebold killed 12 students and 1 teacher and injured more than 20. The pair committed suicide before police were able to engage or apprehend them. If all bombs had been detonated, there could have been hundreds killed in the massacre. The pair had planned to exceed the death count during the Oklahoma City bombing four years earlier.

In January 2011, a shaped pipe bomb was discovered and defused at a Martin Luther King Jr. memorial march in Spokane, Washington; no one was injured during the event. According to the FBI and the DHS, it was a directional anti-personnel IED, radio-controlled and designed to fire fragments – fishing weights coated in rat poison – similarly to a single shot shotgun with buckshot, or a cannon with a grapeshot round.

On 15 April 2013, as the annual Boston Marathon race was concluding, two bombs were detonated seconds apart close to the finish line. Initial FBI response indicated suspicion of IED pressure cooker bombs.

On 17–19 September 2016, several explosions occurred in Manhattan and New Jersey. The sources of the explosions were all found to be IEDs of various types, such as pressure cooker bombs and pipe bombs.

Many IED-related arrests are made each year in circumstances where the plot was foiled before the device was deployed, or the device exploded but no one was injured.

A number of deaths and property damage occurring during gender reveal parties have been caused by the detonation of improvised explosive devices. These include the 2017 Sawmill Fire, which was started by the detonation of a mass of tannerite intended to disperse coloured powder, and an incident in 2019 where an IED similarly designed to release powder exploded in a manner similar to a pipe bomb, killing a 56-year-old woman after shrapnel struck her in the head.

In March 2026 several home made bombs containing TATP were thrown outside of Gracie Mansion where New York City Mayor Zohran Mamdani currently lives. The perpetrators of the attack later confessed they were influenced by ISIS and Islamic extremist propaganda.

=== Ukraine ===
IEDs are in use in the 2022 Russian invasion of Ukraine and have also been used there for assassinations.

=== Vietnam ===
A pamphlet documenting some weapons used by the Viet Cong during the Vietnam War, including some types of IEDs (1967).

IEDs were used during the Vietnam War by the Viet Cong against land- and river-borne vehicles as well as personnel. They were commonly constructed using materials from unexploded American ordnance. Among the various types of IEDs prepared by the Viet Cong there were also anti-aircraft ones, capable of damaging or destroying helicopters during landing or when flying at low altitude.

Thirty-three percent of U.S. casualties in Vietnam and twenty-eight percent of deaths were officially attributed to mines; these figures include losses caused by both IEDs and commercially manufactured mines.

=== Yemen ===
Houthis are using IEDs against Saudi-led coalition and Hadi's forces during Yemeni Civil War (2015–present), Saudi Arabian-led intervention in Yemen and Saudi–Yemeni border conflict.

Al-Qaeda in the Arabian Peninsula and ISIL in Yemen are also known to use IEDs.

== See also ==
- 3D-printed firearm
- Acetone peroxide
- Blast fishing
- Barrack buster
- Barrel bomb
- Bicycle bomb
- Car bomb
- Counter-IED efforts
- Dragon Runner
- Explosive belt
- Explosively formed penetrator
- Fertilizer bomb
- Improvised firearm
- Jam tin grenade
- JIEDDO
- List of notable 3D printed weapons and parts
- Letter bomb
- Lob bomb
- Molotov cocktail
- Nail bomb
- Pipe bomb
- Pressure cooker bomb
- Propane bomb
- Route clearance (IEDs)
- Satchel charge
- Sidolówka grenade
- La Salute è in voi
- The Science of Revolutionary Warfare
- Time bomb (explosive)
- TM 31-210 Improvised Munitions Handbook
- The Anarchist Cookbook
