= Royal Australian Army Ordnance Corps =

- Badge
- Active: 1 July 1902 – present
- Country: Australia
- Branch: Australian Army
- Type: Corps
- Role: Military supply chain management Administration
- Motto: Sua Tela Tonanti (to the Warrior his Arms)

The Royal Australian Army Ordnance Corps (RAAOC) is the Corps within the Australian Army concerned with supply and administration, as well as the demolition and disposal of explosives and salvage of battle-damaged equipment. The Corps contains clerks, operator supplies (including q-store staff, warehouse staff and food technicians), petroleum operators, parachute riggers and ammunition technicians. Members of the Corps are nicknamed Roaches.

Unlike other Corps within the Australian Army, there are no longer any RAAOC specific units, instead RAAOC sub-units sit within mixed units such as Combat Service Support Battalions (CSSBs) or Force Support Battalions (FSBs). RAAOC is also responsible for clerks and quartermaster store staff in all Australian Army Units. The motto of the Royal Australian Army Ordnance Corps is 'sua tela tonanti' (commonly translated to 'to the warrior his arms'), taken from the mother corps, RAOC.

== History ==
The Corps traces its history back to federation where General Edward Hutton started the Australian Army Ordnance Corps. The Corps gained its Royal prefix for its work during the Second World War.

The RAAOC motto translates from Latin to 'To the warrior his arms, to the thunderer his thunder bolts'. The RAAOC badge is copied from the Board of Ordnance in the United Kingdom.

== Structure ==
Members of the ordnance corps will be found serving in most Army units and headquarters. The primary Regular Army units manned by RAAOC soldiers are:

=== Combat Service Support units ===
- 1 Field Supply Company 1 Combat Service Support Battalion (Darwin),
- 3 Field Supply Company 3 Combat Service Support Battalion (Townsville),
- 6 Field Supply Company, 7 Combat Service Support Battalion, Enoggera (Brisbane).

=== Force-level units ===
- 2 Field Supply Company (FSC) as part of 10 Force Support Battalion (Townsville)
- 37 FSC as part of 9 Force Support Battalion (Ipswich).
- 1 Petrol Company (Reserve) as part of 2 Force Support Battalion (Melbourne)
- 6 Supply Platoon (Reserve) as part of 2 Force Support Battalion (Hobart)

However, many Regular Army RAAOC trades are posted to units of all Regular and Reserve units throughout the Australian Defence Force as clerks, storemen(-persons) and other administrative and support roles.

=== RAAOC BOSCs ===
The Army Reserve element of the Corps used to also consist primarily of Supply Companies, with 4, 5, 8, 11, 13 Supply Company of each Combat Service Support Battalion (CSSB) of the respective numbered brigades in each state. As part of Project FOCUS (Project Director Colonel Allan A Murray), these supply companies have been replaced by Brigade Operations Support Companies (BOSCs) in each Reserve brigade. This implementation has centralised supply support to Army Reserve units, and as such, has been witness to a change of trade for Army Reserve members from warehousing (as in the old reserve Supply Companies) to Q-store streams.

CSSB still exist in the Reserve brigades, the BOSC replaces Admin Company, Supply Company and Catering Company. The BOSC is Controlled by the CO of the CSSB of that brigade. Some positions will be replaced by APS, and other positions will not be replaced once ARA staff are posted out in the future. The old Supply Companies will make a limited return, but the APS civilians will run them as Brigade Operational Support Companies (BOSC). The CSSB will have their own Q store manned by ARes members.

== RAAOC trades ==
=== Supply Coordinator ===
The Supply Coordinator (also known as "Storeman", "OP SUP", "Yardies" or "Queeies"), formerly Operator Supply - can be employed as Unit Q-store staff or in Warehousing - also has sub-specialities: Food Inspector, MILIS system managers, etc. Broadly speaking it is divided into Operator Unit Supply (Quieees) and Operator Supply Chain (Yardies).

The OP SUP is a soldier who has knowledge of the defence supply chain, and under supervision, has a key role in the provision of logistic Supply support within the formation. The OP SUP is a multi skilled soldier, and conducts duties relating to Supply support, Supply systems and unit Supply. The range of tasks includes inventory control, warehousing and distribution, Supply management processes, operator equipment maintenance and specialised packaging tasks related to dangerous goods. The OP SUP is required to drive and maintain a variety of Army vehicles and operate Mechanical Handling Equipment. The OP SUP may be required to operate in combat, Combat Support and Combat Service Support roles.

An OP SUP is to undertake the demand, receipt, storage, security, maintenance, inspection, internal issue, accounting for and disposal of all types of equipment and stores for, or held by the unit. OP SUP may be recruited or selected for the additional AMMO SUP course and specialise in ammo supply (see AT/ATO trade details below).

=== Operator Administration ===
The Operator Administration (also known as an OP ADMIN or "Clerk") conducts General administrative roles e.g. filing, typing and records.

The OP ADMIN is a soldier who is responsible for the provision of first line personnel management support and resource management to units and members of the Australia Defence Organisation. The OP ADMIN has the skill sets to fill the role of Resource Manager or Career Manager and may also be employed within the training environment as an Instructor, Assessor, Trade Manager or Training Developer. As an OP ADMIN progresses through the trade and ranks, they gain a great deal of useful administrative skills including personnel management, public administration, financial management and concepts of government procedures.

=== Rigger Parachute ===
The Rigger Parachute Rigger (also known as RIGGER) is qualified to pack, repair and maintain parachutes and associated equipment for personnel, cargo and helicopter lift equipment for the Army. All Parachute Riggers are to be Basic Parachute Course qualified and as a Corporal are to be free fall qualified. The Rigger Parachute is a soldier who performs a wide range of technical functions on Aerial Delivery Equipment (ADE) including personnel and cargo inspection, repack, repair, modification, malfunction analysis, sentencing, procurement and fleet management of ADE.

=== Petroleum Operator ===
The Petroleum Operator (also known as a PET OP or OP PETRL) organise bulk fuel shipping and storage (tankers, big rubber bladders etc.).

The OP PETRL is a soldier who is responsible for the deployment, construction, operation and maintenance of a range of petroleum, oils and lubricants (POL) storage and handling facilities. The function of an OP PETRL is to operate and manage POL equipment and products. This includes the operation of field and static POL equipment, the laboratory testing and analysis of POL products, and the storage, packaging and disposal of Dangerous Goods (DG), include hazardous materials, but excluding DG Class 1 (Ammunition and Explosives).

=== Ammunition Technical Officer/Ammunition Technician ===
The Ammunition Technical Officer (ATO) and Ammunition Technician (AT or TECH AMMO) are involved with ammunition and explosives repair, storage, maintenance and disposal (EOD) and (IEDD)

An ATO is a Commissioned Officer and an AT is a soldier who are ammunition and explosives specialists with the principal role of providing ammunition safety and performance assurance to commanders. They provide technical advice, technical support and management functions relating to ammunition and explosives to commanders, staff and other organisations at all levels. Through detailed knowledge of ammunition design and explosives engineering, the responsibilities and an ATO and an AT encompass all aspects of construction, function, use, storage, distribution, transportation, inspection, repair, maintenance, disposal and accounting of ammunition and explosives, including the operation of related equipment and facilities. An ATO and an AT also undertakes specific tasks for military and civil authorities by the provision of support for the identification and disposal of un-exploded ordnance (EOD) and Improvised Explosive Devices (IEDD).

ATOs and ATs are trained at the Australian Army School of Ordnance. ATOs and ATs may also be selected for advanced EOD and IEDD training in the UK, USA and Canada.

=== Ammunition Supplier ===
The Ammunition Supplier (Ammo Sup) is an OP SUP soldier specialising in and responsible for ammunition supply and accounting within units across the entire Army. An ammunition supply specialist performs a range of duties from stores accounting, electronic ledger entry, to warehousing duties including receiving and issuing ammunition. As Ammo Sup progress, they have the opportunity to become an Ammunition Technician.

=== Conductors ===
One Conductor appointment per RAAOC trade was reintroduced into the Royal Australian Army Ordnance Corps for selected Warrant Officers Class 1 in 2006. A conductor is considered to be senior WO1.

== Customs and traditions ==
=== Colours ===
The colours of the Ordnance Corps are scarlet, in reference to their link with the combat Corps, and royal blue. Scarlet and royal blue were also the colours of the UK Board of Ordnance, which had responsibility for the provision of logistics, engineering and artillery capability until their transfer to Army in the mid-nineteenth century. Unit colour patches consist of a large scarlet square on a dark blue background, with a dark blue geometric shape in the middle.

=== Motto ===
In 1928 the British War Office in London gave approval for the then AAOC to adopt the same motto as the British RAOC taken from the Ancient Board of Ordnance being the Latin phrase SUA TELA TONANTI (Normally translated to as 'To the warrior his arms').

=== Sovereign's Banner ===
The RAAOC Colonel-in-Chief Queen Elizabeth II bestowed a Sovereign's Banner on the RAAOC. The Governor General of Australia Sir Zelman Cowen presented this banner to RAAOC at a parade held at Bandiana on 4 December 1981.

=== Corps Badge ===
The RAAOC badge design was developed from the badge of the now disbanded British RAOC and consists of four elements: the Crown, Garter, Riband and Shield. The shield depicts three field cannons and three cannonballs and forms part of the coat of arms granted to the Board of Ordnance in 1823.

The motto of the Order of the Garter 'Honi soit qui mal y pense' is inscribed on the Garter.

== Training ==
RAAOC training and Corps HQ is based at Army Logistic Training Centre (ALTC) at Bandiana in rural Victoria. The length of training for soldiers of the Ordnance Corps varies between five weeks for an administrative clerk, to the 18 Month Ammunition Technical Officer course. To train as an ammunition technician, a member must have a minimum of three years service and have achieved the rank of corporal.

== Order of precedence ==
Preceded by Royal Australian Army Dental Corps	Australian Army Order of Precedence	Succeeded by Royal Australian Electrical and Mechanical Engineers

== See also ==
- Royal Army Ordnance Corps
- Royal Logistic Corps
- Royal New Zealand Army Ordnance Corps
