= Barry Edward Johnson =

English mathematician

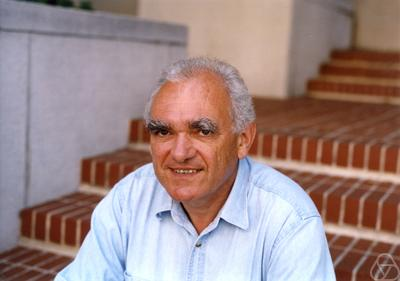
Barry Edward Johnson

Barry Edward Johnson (1 Aug 1937 Woolwich, London, England – 5 May 2002 Newcastle upon Tyne, England) was an English mathematician who worked on operator algebras. He was elected a fellow of the Royal Society in 1978.
