= Ammunition technical officer =

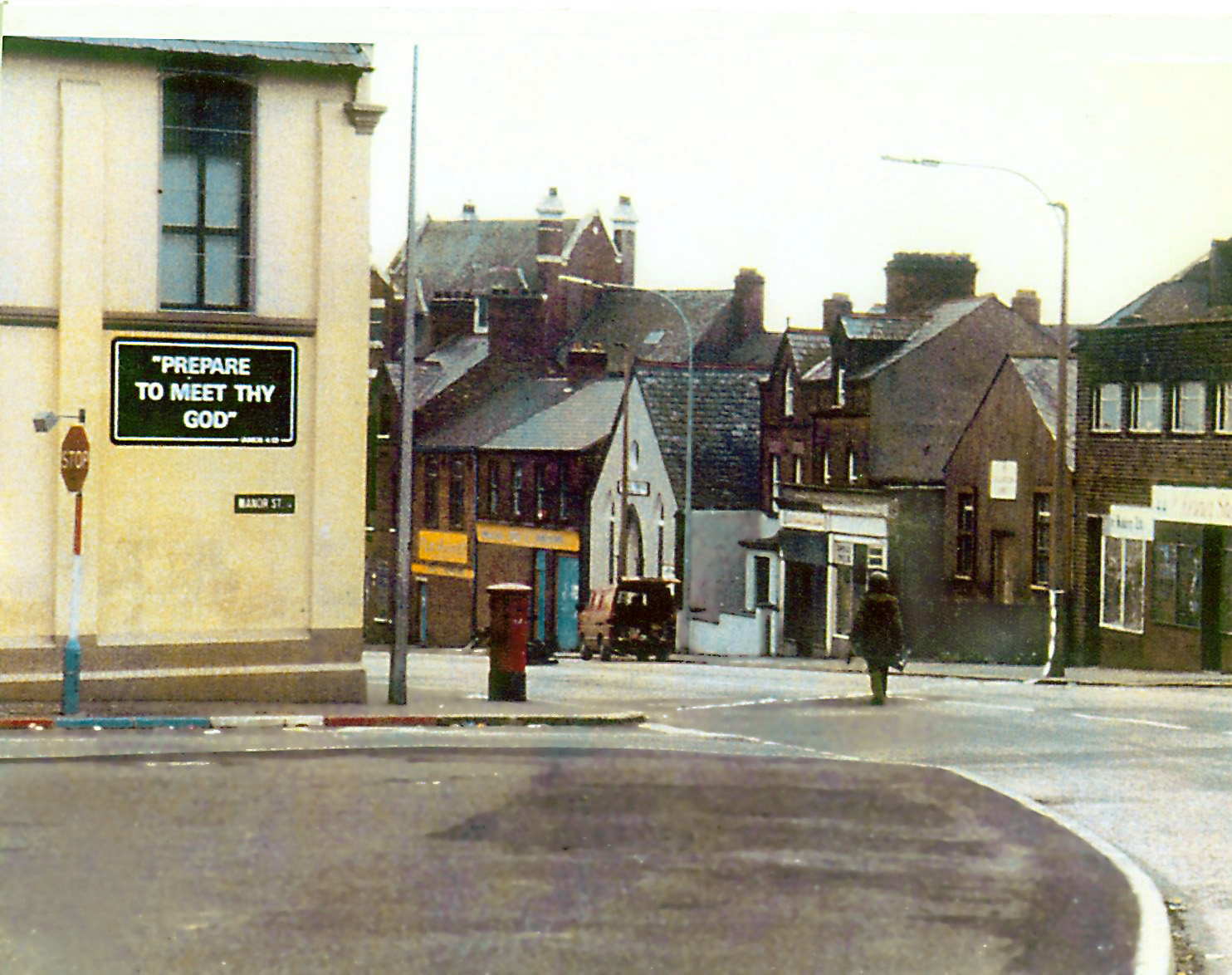
A British Army ammunition technical officer approaches a suspect device in Northern Ireland.

An ammunition technical officer (ATO) is an officer involved in all aspects of the army, air force, and navy's use of ammunition. This includes: bomb disposal, clearance of ERW, explosives accident investigation, procurement, in service management, storage, and inspection and repair.

== British Army ==
ATOs are generally selected as captains, exclusively from within the Royal Logistic Corps; however when an ammunition technician (AT) warrant officer (WO) or senior non-commissioned officer (SNCO) is selected for commission, their AT qualification transfers to that of an ATO. One such example is Major Peter Norton GC.

ATO training takes 20 months and requires attendance at the Defence Academy of the United Kingdom Military College of Science and the Defence EOD Munitions Search School Kineton, formerly known as the Army School of Ammunition. After conclusion of the training, the new ATO may take command of an EOD troop within 11 Explosive Ordnance Disposal and Search Regiment RLC or be employed within an ammunition squadron or ammunition depot.

In 11 EOD & Search Regiment RLC or 33 EOD & Search Regiment RE, the ATO performs, in addition to the troop commander's role, counterterrorism bomb disposal activities and IEDD within the UK, occasionally leading an EOD team. WO and SNCO ATs routinely lead those EOD teams, and when doing so are often referred to as the ATO.

ATs and ATOs can undergo further EOD training at the Felix Centre within the Defence EOD Munitions Search School Kineton. ATOs alongside ATs are the UK's ammunition experts, with many years of experience in Palestine, Aden, Cyprus, Northern Ireland, the Balkans, Iraq, Afghanistan, and anywhere where the British Army have forces deployed and require EOD expertise and advice.

Armed forces of other nations also have ATOs, some of which are trained by the British Army. These countries include Canada, New Zealand, and Singapore. Canadian ATOs, however have not been trained by the British since 2012 and complete their training at the Royal Military College of Canada and the Canadian Forces Logistics Training Centre.

=== Operational honours ===
==== George Cross ====
- Lieutenant WM Eastman GC, Royal Army Ordnance Corps. 24 December 1940.
- Captain RL Jephson-Jones GC, Royal Army Ordnance Corps. 24 December 1940.
- Major George Styles GC, Royal Army Ordnance Corps. 11 January 1972.
- Captain Peter Norton GC, Royal Logistic Corps. 24 July 2005.
- Captain Joe Varey GC. Royal Logistic Corps, 24 July 2005.

==== George Medal ====
- Capt Daniel Marc Shepherd GM, Royal Logistic Corps. 19 March 2010. Killed whilst clearing Improvised Explosive Devices (IEDs) in Helmand Province, Afghanistan.

==== Military Cross ====
- Captain SD Bratcher MC, Royal Logistic Corps. 24 March 2006.
- Major ID Scattergood MBE MC, Royal Logistic Corps. 25 July 2008.

==== Queen's Gallantry Medal ====
- Captain Vincent Michael Strafford QGM, Royal Logistic Corps. 19 July 2007.
- Captain Wayne Edward James Owers MBE QGM, Royal Logistic Corps. 19 March 2010.

==== Queen's Gallantry Medal with Bar ====
- Captain Eamon Conrad Heakin QGM*, Royal Logistic Corps. 7 March 2008.
- Captain Vincent Michael Strafford QGM*, Royal Logistic Corps. 7 March 2008.

== Australian Army ==
The Australian Army also employs ATOs, who are members of the Royal Australian Army Ordnance Corps (RAAOC). RAAOC ATOs are trained in Australia, and this training has also been made available to members of other regional (Asia/South Pacific) Defence Forces.

== Canadian Armed Forces ==
The Canadian Armed Forces has a 12 month ATO programme held in 2 phases, with the academic phase at the Royal Military College of Canada in Kingston and the technical phase at the Canadian Forces Logistics Training Centre in CFB Borden. It is a specialization that three trades, Aerospace Engineers, Naval Combat Systems Engineering Officers and Logistics Officers, can be selected for. After completion of the course, ATOs can be employed in Ammunition and Explosives inventory management, life cycle management and execution of the Ammunition and Explosive Safety Program.

== Pakistan Army ==
The Pakistan Army has ATOs who are trained at the Pakistan Army Ordnance College. They are selected from the officers of the Pakistan Army Ordnance Corps in almost the same manner as that of the British Army ATOs. They are specialists in the ammunition field, and have many years of experience within Pakistan and other countries, such as Liberia, Congo, Ivory Coast, Sudan, Congo, CAR and elsewhere the Pakistan Army is deployed as part of the UN. Pakistan ATOs have the unique honour of handling / clearing IEDs and completing EOD Operations during War On Terror in Swat, North and South Waziristan Agencies and even in the settled areas of the countries. Most of the ATOs have specialized from CIED and EOD Trg programmes covered by British and US EOD institutes to assist the Engineers Corps as a technical expert to handle all IEDs and supervise their EOD activities and clearance of ERW. The major part of ATOs was in recent Operation Zarb-e-Azab. It is imperative to note and mention here, that, every field formation of Pakistan Army has a specified ATO appointment amongst its Staff Appointments to work as Advisor on Ammunition Matters to the Formation Commander directly. In UN, ATOs of the Battalions and Sector HQ work hand in glove with UNMAS for all EOD operations and clearance of ERW.

== South African Army ==
The role and function of the South African Ammunition Corps is to ensure that only safe and effective ammunition is supplied to the Department of Defence and other users. Their functions includes participation in research and development, quality assurance, unit inspection, maintenance and disposal of ammunition. Candidates must have a sound psychological profile exhibiting a high degree of intelligence, steadiness and an aptitude or innovative technical thinking. Learners must be in possession of a National Senior Certificate (Grade 12) or Level 4 (N3) certificate and must have passed Mathematics and Physical Science.

== Bangladesh Army ==
The Ammunition Technical Officers (ATOs) of Bangladesh Army are selected technically proficient and specialist officers of Bangladesh Army Ordnance Corps. They are trained at Ordnance Centre and School (OC&S) of Bangladesh Army for 32 weeks duration on various Ammunition, Explosives, EOD, CIED and IEDD, CBRNE and all management matters related to these fields. After a long, arduous training journey, the newly qualified ammunition/explosive experts are inducted into the valiant group of ATOs of the Bangladesh Army. Furthermore, many of them attain foreign training in ammunition/explosives and IED-related fields from renowned institutions across the world. The ATOs are specialists in the munitions and explosives arena, and have many years of experience within Bangladesh and other countries, such as Kuwait, Liberia, DR Congo, Ivory Coast, Sudan, CAR, Mali, Somalia and elsewhere the Bangladesh Army is deployed as part of the UN force.

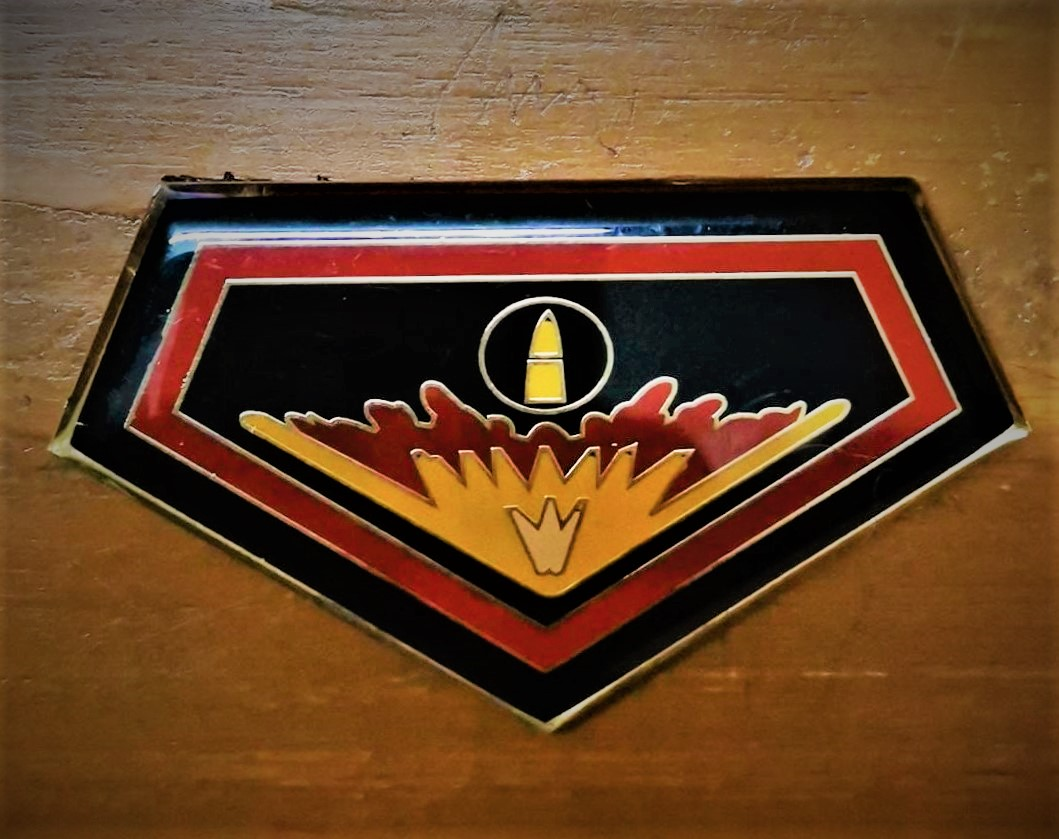
ATO insignia

ATOs of the Bangladesh Army are always ready to face any eventualities in the Field Formation, during field firing or heavy weapon firing, while working in assistance to civil administration and in overseas employment. At present, they are performing the following core responsibilities:

- Perform as ATO in the unit, formations and on deputation.
- Provide ATO support to Border Guard Bangladesh (BGB), Bangladesh Police and Rapid Action Battalion (RAB) Forces.
- Perform as IMAS Level 3+ EOD and IEDD operator.
- Employed as Counter-IED (C-IED) enablers such as members of site exploitation teams, Weapon Technical Intelligence (WTI) Teams, the Intelligence Community (IC), and CIED staff at various levels.
- Perform responsibility in UN Peacekeeping missions and various overseas employment as ATO/ SATO/ EOD Operator/ IEDD Operator.
- Render technical advices on ammunitions, explosives, UXO and IEDs.
- Perform the responsibility of instructor on ammunitions, explosives, EOD, IEDD, CIED, CBRN and all matters related to these fields.
- Perform investigation of all accidents related to ammunition and explosives in Bangladesh.

ATOs of the Bangladesh Army always abreast themselves with up-to-date knowledge on the latest development of trends in warfare, ammunition/explosives and IEDs, related policies and procedures, and material management as part of professional development through specialized training, self-study and interaction with experts in this field. ATOs of the Bangladesh Army also have the scope to remain updated on the EOD, CIED & IEDD and CBRN matters under the umbrella of Bangladesh Army C-IED Fusion Centre (BACFC) and Subject Matter Expert Exchange (SMEE) with renowned institutions of the world.

All responsibilities in respect of ammunition management are done by ATOs in Bangladesh Army at different capacities, such as:

EMPLOYMENT OF ATO
Category	Role
Ammo Operator	Assist in the handling and movement of ammo and explosive substances and articles during issue, receipt, storage and distribution
Ammo Processor	Inspect, maintain and repair ammo or other explosive substances and articles
Ammo Accountant	Accurately account for ammo and explosive substances and articles
Ammo Supervisor	Supervise the issue, receipt, storage, distribution and maintenance and disposal of ammo and explosive substances and articles
Ammo Manager	Manage the storage, issue, receipt, distribution, maintenance and stockpile management of ammo and explosive substances and articles
Ammo Inspector	Develop, implement and audit the policy and technical instruction for all aspects of the stockpile management of ammo and explosive substances and articles
Ammo Regulator	Develop National and International policy and technical instruction for all aspects of the stockpile management of ammo and explosive substances and articles
IEDD Operator	Plan, Supervise and Operate in the IED threat environment with advanced level theory and practical knowledge of IED device profile, equipment skills, tactics and technics analysis, practical IEDD skills including complex IED RSP formulation and execution, management and leadership Capability to provide technical advice to leadership, equipment management, task management and planning
EOD Operator	Locate, identify, disarm, neutralize, recover, and dispose of ERW, Conventional CBRN ammo, and criminal or terrorist devices. Requires knowledge of composition and characteristics of BD and foreign conventional, CBRN ordnance; electronics, precautions, tools, and protective equipment required for response
Lab Operator	Various laboratory operations for ammo cannibalization, ammo up-gradation, de-militarization, and conditioning of ammo and explosives for Bangladesh Army as well as sister services

ATOs of the Bangladesh Army are to remain a practitioner on ammunition/ explosives-related appointments and are required to undertake diverse and multi-layered refresher and currency training to maintain the competency level; only to validate their authorization as National Ammunition experts empowered by allotted ATO number. This authorization is subject to revoke if the individual fails to perform.

== See also ==
- Ammunition Technician (AT)
