= Barry Johnson (British Army soldier) =

- Born: 25 January 1952 (age 74); London, England
- Military career
- Allegiance: United Kingdom
- Branch: British Army
- Service years: 1967–1992
- Rank: Warrant Officer Class 1
- Service number: 24092380
- Unit: Royal Army Ordnance Corps
- Conflicts: The Troubles
- Awards: George Cross

Warrant Officer Class 1 Barry Johnson, GC (born 25 January 1952) is a former British Army soldier of the Royal Army Ordnance Corps who was awarded the George Cross for his gallantry in defusing a mortar bomb in Derry, Northern Ireland on 7 October 1989. The device detonated, causing him serious injury. Notice of his award appeared in the London Gazette on 6 November 1990.

== Early life ==
Johnson was born on 25 January 1952 in London and entered the Army Apprentices College as an Ammunition Technician in 1967.

== Citation ==
What follows is the full text of the official citation for Johnson's George Cross as it appeared in the London Gazette:

The QUEEN has been graciously pleased to approve the award of the George Cross to the undermentioned:-

24092380 Warrant Officer Class 1 Barry JOHNSON, Royal Army Ordnance Corps.

WO1 B. Johnson, R.A.O.C. serving as an E.O.D. operator in N. Ireland completed 25 E.O.D. tasks, including the safe neutralization of 9 live devices. The most significant incident occurred when W.O.1 Johnson was tasked to a vehicle which, it was suspected, contained mortars designed to be fired at a nearby Security Forces base. The vehicle had been abandoned in the middle of a housing estate and beside a hospital.

WO1 Johnson immediately realized that civilian lives would be put at risk if any of the mortar bombs were inadvertently launched during his disposal action. The normal procedure would have been to deal with the mortars by using a remotely controlled vehicle to disrupt the device. He decided that this posed too great a risk to civilian lives and that he would have to remove the bombs from their firing tubes and dismantle them by hand.

With the help of his assistant, the firing tubes were carefully moved from the back of the vehicle and placed on the ground. As the next stage was extremely hazardous, due to the delicate nature of the bombs, WO1 Johnson sent his assistant back behind cover and continued the render-safe procedure alone. He placed the firing tubes so that if they fired or exploded, the patients in the hospital would not have been in danger. In the dark, and in a bitterly cold drizzle, which made the handling of metal objects more hazardous, he proceeded to remove the bombs, dismantling each in turn. While he was dismantling the last bomb, there was an explosion, causing him very serious injury to his face, eyes and legs. Completely blinded by high velocity fragments, he was thrown across the road by the force of the blast, suffering multiple injuries to his legs. Such was his courage and determination to ensure that the task was completed safely that, although in great pain, he refused to be evacuated until he had carefully briefed his assistant on the precise details of the device so that the operation could be safely completed by a replacement operator.
