= Explosive ordnance disposal (United States Army) =

US Army bomb disposal personnel

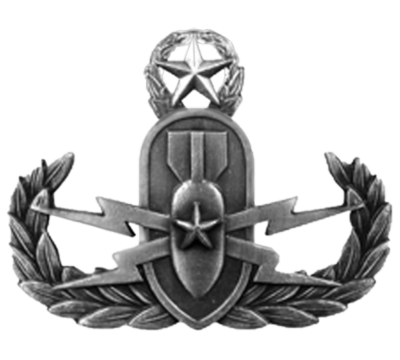

Explosive Ordnance Disposal (EOD) in the United States Army is the specialization responsible for detecting, identifying, evaluating, rendering safe, exploiting, and disposing of conventional, improvised, and chemical, biological, radiological, and nuclear (CBRN) explosive ordnance. It is a core competency of the US Army Ordnance Corps, along with Maintenance, Ammunition, and Explosive Safety.

The military occupational specialty (MOS) code is 89D for enlisted personnel. Officers have the area of concentration (AOC) of 89E, but earn the 90A AOC after the U.S. Army Captain's Career Course.

EOD support is provided during peace and war to US forces, allies, foreign partners, and Tribal, Federal, State, and local law enforcement. Examples of missions include:

- Direct support to US Maneuver, Special Operations, Fires, and Aviation forces
- Defense Support of Civil Authorities (DSCA)
- Unexploded ordnance mitigation
- United States Secret Service Very Important Person Protection Support Activity (VIPPSA)
- Theater Security Cooperation
- Humanitarian Mine Action (HMA)
- CBRN mitigation
- Counter-IED (CIED)

Additionally, the U.S. Army is the Lead Agent and Head of Delegation to the North Atlantic Treaty Organization (NATO) Counter Improvised Explosive Device and EOD Working Groups.

== History ==
Explosive Ordnance Disposal has existed in various forms since the invention of explosives and industrial warfare. However, modern EOD formations largely trace their lineage to World War II, most notably during the Battle of Britain. Heavy aerial bombing of the United Kingdom by the German Luftwaffe left behind hundreds of tons of unexploded ordnance (UXO), then referred to as unexploded bombs (UXB). The British formed bomb squads to address the threat. Bombs that simply failed to function as design (duds) were relatively easy to dispose of but bombs with more sophisticated fuzes posed unique threats. Those that had time-delay fuzes, fuzes with anti-tamper or anti-remove devices, or those that incorporated anti-handling features caused high casualties that required a more professionalized force.

Recognizing this threat posed by UXO, the United States Army, Navy, and Marine Corps began sending volunteers to train on techniques at Melksham Royal Air Force (RAF) Station, Wiltshire, England, in 1940. Many of these volunteers were graduates of or would return to the US to attend the U.S. Naval Mine Disposal School at the Naval Gun Factory, Washington D.C. They would then form the first class of the newly established U.S. Bomb Disposal School at Aberdeen Proving Grounds, MD. By 1942, the first U.S. Army Bomb Disposal Units were organized and deployed to the European and Pacific Theaters. These companies, however, were deemed to be too immobile to address the workload, so they were further reconsolidated into seven-soldier squads.

After WWII, the U.S. Army contracted, deactivating several bomb disposal units and converting a few to a reserve status. The remaining bomb disposal units were redesignated as "explosive ordnance disposal" in 1949. When the Korean War started in 1950, the U.S. Army faced an urgent need for an EOD capability. Unfortunately, there was a lack of personnel, training, and equipment that require a rapid correction and significant investment. Eventually, once training and equipment requirements were met, EOD squads were grown from seven-soldier to eight-soldier squads.

The Korean War solidified the requirement for a standing U.S. Army EOD capability. The U.S. Army EOD mission was expanded in 1954 to include the mission to render-safe and dispose of nuclear weapons. Then in 1962, the mission was further expanded to include the disposal of chemical and biological munitions. However, those roles and responsibilities would diminish as many are currently shared with other U.S. military services and government agencies.

The Vietnam War further increased demand for U.S. Army EOD Soldiers. The first EOD units were deployed in 1965 and remained through the duration of the war. The Vietnam War was considerably different than previous conflicts. The extraordinary use of munitions and the proliferation of booby traps, later called improvised explosive devices, created new challenges for EOD, requiring units to increase to 12-person detachments and ammunition battalion sections. Despite this increase, there remained a shortage of available EOD personnel. At war's height in 1969, the U.S. had more than 540,000 military personnel in Vietnam, supported by less than 300 EOD personnel. However, despite this example, there was another post-war decline in EOD activity as the mission focused on peacetime emergency response calls.

Throughout the 1980s and 1990s, U.S. Army EOD units continued to provide peacetime support with moments punctuated by international conflict including Operation Desert Storm / Desert Shield, in 1990, the NATO intervention in Bosnia and Herzegovina, in 1995, and the NATO intervention in the Kosovo War, in 1999. These conflicts were the first real test for the reorganized U.S. Army EOD formations. The scale and saturation of UXOs and the massive demolition of ammunition stockpiles challenged the formations and led to lessons learned that helped identify additional training and equipment requirements.

The wars in Afghanistan and Iraq dramatically changed and increased the demand for EOD combat support units. During the initial invasions, the U.S. Army EOD mission required the focus to be primarily on conventional operations, such as UXO mitigation and emergency ammunition destruction. However, the mission focus quickly transitioned to address the asymmetric threat as counter-insurgency operations (COIN) began. The U.S. invested heavily counter-IED (CIED) capabilities, including EOD. EOD units were expanded and equipped with increasingly sophisticated technologies as adversaries similarly improved their tactics, techniques, and procedures. Mission sets began to transform with increased support to weapons technical intelligence collection and support to special forces operations. However, the increased special operations forces demand came under scrutiny as some were concerned that EOD companies were not being properly trained and equipped to meet the special operations demands. The most significant transformation was to the "modularization" of U.S. Army EOD formations. Starting in 2005, EOD units were realigned with Brigade Combat Teams (BCT), grown from 21-person detachments to 41-person companies, and new headquarters were established. This transformation coincided with a general consolidation of forces aligned with recommendations made by the 2005 Base Realignment and Closure Commission. As part of those recommendations, EOD forces were consolidated onto fewer bases.

U.S. Army EOD downsized as part of the 2013 sequestration, inactivating several battalions headquarters and companies through 2016. In 2017, the U.S. Army adopted multidomain operations as its operational concept for future transformation. The limited scope of counter-insurgency and CIED operations allowed EOD leaders to focus on specific tasks. The challenge for EOD leaders now is to prepare forces for missions across domains and the competition continuum. There are concerns that the U.S. lacks the required EOD force structure to meet all missions. To address those concerns, the TRADOC Proponent Office - Explosive Ordnance Disposal (TPO-EOD) created, and the U.S. Army approved, the largest force design update (FDU) since 2006. The EOD Multidomain FDU (EOD MDO FDU) created new EOD unit types, added created EOD companies, and realigned current EOD units.

== Selection and training ==
=== Selection ===
Army Regulation 611-105 Selection, Training, and Suitability for Explosive Ordnance Disposal establishes the minimum requirements for EOD training:

Minimum Requirements
Non-waiverable	Waiveable
Be a U.S. Citizen	GM score greater than 105
Possess a valid U.S. driver's license	Medical profile (PUHLES) of 111121
Normal color vision	Eligible for a "secret" security clearance
Normal hearing	
Not previously relieved from EOD training	
Correctable vision to 20/40	
Volunteer for EOD	

Enlisted candidates apply through a U.S. Army recruiter or retention NCO. Officer candidates are selected during their commissioning source's branching process.

=== Training ===
US Army EOD training is completed in two phases:

EOD Phase 1 - US Army preparatory course at Fort Gregg-Adams, Virginia. The course is approximately 7-weeks long and designed to prepare students for Naval School Explosive Ordnance Disposal (NAVSCOLEOD). The training begins with a bomb suit suitability test, then is divided into five phases:

Module	Description
Module A	Introduction, history, basic concepts
Module B	Introduction to demolitions, explosive tools, disarming techniques
Module C	Identification of ordnance, basic weapons functioning
Module E	EOD publications, reconnaissance, and safety
Module F	Tools, robotics, and the EOD challenge

EOD Phase 2 - Naval School Explosive Ordnance Disposal (NAVSCOLEOD) is a joint-service school at Eglin Air Force Base, FL. It is attended by EOD candidates from the US Army, Navy, Air Force, Marines, other government agency representatives, and select international students^{[8]}. The course is 26 academic weeks long and divided into eight phases^{[7]}:

Division	Description
Demolition	Explosive effects, theory, safety, and live demolition
Tools and Methods (TMD)	EOD tools, dearmers, and techniques
Core	Basic EOD skill sets, safeties, essential principles
Ground Ordnance	Familiarization with grenades, projectiles, and landmines
Air Ordnance	Familiarization with aircraft explosive hazards, bombs, guided missiles, dispensers, and payloads
IEDs	Familiarization with improvised explosive devices
Chemical/Biological (CB)	Familiarization with chemical/biological weapons, effects, and decontamination
Radiological/Nuclear (RND)	Familiarization with radiological/nuclear weapons, effects, and decontamination

=== Graduation ===
Graduates of NAVSCOLEOD will have earned the Explosive Ordnance Disposal Badge. The badge is issued on a temporary status, individuals must remain in good standing for 18-months before the award becomes permanent.

=== Additional training ===
Upon completion of EOD Phase 2, EOD Officers will attend a week-long course Platoon Leader's Course to be familiarized with essential duties.

EOD Soldiers may be required to attend various other courses dependent on mission requirements, examples include: airborne, air assault, defensive driving, advanced marksmanship, advanced IED defeat (AIEDDs), and various other civil or joint schools.

==== Team leader validation ====
Soldiers who lead an EOD must be validated by their leadership through a process called "Team Leader Validation." Team Leader Validation is a unit-led and administered program designed to ensure leaders have the requisite skills to operate independently. Tasks vary between commands and mission sets, example tasks include: x-ray interpretation, vehicle-borne IED, CBRN incident response, and IED hand entry.

== Structure ==
EOD units often deploy and operate independently from their higher headquarters. Platoons and companies deploy to provide EOD support while battalions and groups provide command and control or augment division, theater, or corps headquarters staff

EOD Teams/Sections/Platoons
Unit	Composition	Description
Team (2-3 Soldiers)	1x Team Leader, Staff Sergeant (E6) 2x Team Sergeant, Sergeant (E5)	Base unit of EOD
Response Section (10x Soldiers)	3x 2-soldier EOD teams; -1x Section Sergeant, Sergeant First Class (E7)	Provides EOD response for Operational Support and CONUS Support Companies
EOD Platoon (11x Soldiers)	-3x 3-Soldier EOD Teams -1x Platoon Leader, Lieutenant (O1/O2) -1x Platoon Sergeant, Sergeant First Class (E7)	Provides EOD response for Divisional Support, Mixed Airborne, Airborne, and WMD companies

Companies
Unit Type	Composition	Leadership	Description
Operational Support Company (OSC) (26x Soldiers)	2x Response Sections; 1x Operations section	Commander, Captain (O3); First Sergeant, First Sergeant (E8); Response Officer, Lieutenant (O1/O2)	Provides Defense Support of Civil Authorities (DSCA), support to military installations and rear areas during multidomain operations
Division Support Company (DSC) (41x Soldiers)	3x EOD platoons; 1x Operations section	Commander, Captain (O3); First Sergeant, First Sergeant (E8); Executive Officer, Lieutenant (O1/O2)	Provides support to maneuver, special forces, other government agencies, Defense Support of Civil Authorities (DSCA), military installations during multidomain operations
Mixed Airborne (41x Soldiers)	3x EOD platoons; 1x Operations section	Commander, Captain (O3); First Sergeant, First Sergeant (E8); Executive Officer, Lieutenant (O1/O2)	Airborne capable - provides support to maneuver, special forces, other government agencies, Defense Support of Civil Authorities (DSCA), military installations during multidomain operations
Airborne (41x Soldiers)	3x EOD platoons; 1x Operations section	Commander, Major (O4); First Sergeant, First Sergeant (E8); Executive Officer, Captain (O3)	Provides direct support to 75th Ranger Regiment
WMD (41x Soldiers)	2x EOD platoons; Operations section; Liaison team	Commander, Major (O4); First Sergeant, First Sergeant (E8); Executive Officer, Captain (O3); Response Officer, Lieutenant (O1/O2)	Provides EOD support to defeat or mitigate the effects of Weapons of Mass Destruction (WMD)
CONUS Support (30x Soldiers)	2x Response sections; Operations section	Commander, Captain (O3); First Sergeant, First Sergeant (E8); Response Officer, Lieutenant (O1/O2)	Provides EOD Support to the National Capital Region (NCR)

Battalions Groups
Unit Type	Composition	Leadership	Description
Battalion	2-6 EOD Companies; Headquarters and Headquarters Detachment (HHD)	Commander, Lieutenant Colonel (O5); Command Sergeant Major, Command Sergeant Major (E9); Executive Officer, Major (O4); Operations Officer Major (O4)	Provides command and control for subordinate EOD organizations. Augments division and corps staff with subject matter experts. Facilitates all EOD tasks within assigned mission areas.
Group	2-6 EOD Battalions; Headquarters and Headquarters Detachment (HHD)	Commander, Colonel (O6); Command Sergeant Major, Command Sergeant Major (E9); Deputy Commander, Lieutenant Colonel (O5); Executive Officer, Lieutenant Colonel (O5); Operations Officer, Lieutenant Colonel (O5)	Provides command and control for subordinate EOD organizations. Augments corps, and theater staff with subject matter experts. Facilitates all EOD tasks within assigned mission areas.

== Units ==
U.S. Army EOD has active duty and National Guard components. It comprises 3 EOD Groups (Brigade equivalent), 9 Battalions, and 52 Companies.

=== Active duty ===
Active duty units are under the United States Army Forces Command (FORSCOM).

==== 20th CBRNE Command subordinates ====
The 20th CBRNE Command subordinates are as follows.

- 52nd Ordnance Group (EOD)(Fort Campbell, KY)
  - Headquarters and Headquarters Detachment (HHD)
  - 184th Ordnance Battalion (EOD) (Fort Campbell, KY)
    - Headquarters and Headquarters Detachment (HHD)
    - 38th Ordnance Company (EOD) (Fort Stewart, GA)
    - 49th Ordnance Company (EOD) (Fort Campbell, KY)
    - 717th Ordnance Company (EOD) (Fort Campbell, KY)
    - 723th Ordnance Company (EOD) (Fort Campbell, KY)
    - 744th Ordnance Company (EOD) (Fort Campbell, KY)
    - 756th Ordnance Company (EOD) (Fort Stewart, GA)
    - 789th Ordnance Company (EOD) (Fort Benning, GA)
  - 192nd Ordnance Battalion (EOD) (Fort Bragg, NC)
    - Headquarters and Headquarters Detachment (HHD)
    - 18th Ordnance Company (EOD) (Fort Bragg, NC)
    - 28th Ordnance Company (EOD) (Airborne) (Fort Bragg, NC)
    - 55th Ordnance Company (EOD) (CONUS Support) (Fort Belvoir, VA)
    - 722nd Ordnance Company (EOD) (Fort Bragg, NC)
    - 754th Ordnance Company (EOD) (Fort Drum, NY)
    - 760th Ordnance Company (EOD) (Fort Drum, NY)
    - 767th Ordnance Company (EOD) (Fort Bragg, NC)
- 71st Ordnance Group (EOD) (Fort Carson, CO)
  - Headquarters and Headquarters Detachment (HHD) (Fort Carson, CO)
  - 3rd Ordnance Battalion (EOD) (Joint Base Lewis-McChord, WA)
    - Headquarters and Headquarters Detachment (HHD)
    - 53rd Ordnance Company (EOD) (Yakima Training Center, WA)
    - 707th Ordnance Company (EOD) (Joint Base Lewis-McChord, WA)
    - 734th Ordnance Company (EOD) (Fort Bliss, TX)
    - 741st Ordnance Company (EOD) (Fort Bliss, TX)
    - 759th Ordnance Company (EOD) (Fort Bliss, TX)
    - 787th Ordnance Company (EOD) (Joint Base Lewis-McChord, WA)
  - 79th Ordnance Battalion (EOD) (Fort Riley, KS)
    - Headquarters and Headquarters Detachment (HHD)
    - 630th Ordnance Company (EOD) (Fort Riley, KS)
    - 774th Ordnance Company (EOD) (Fort Riley, KS)
    - 704th Ordnance Company (EOD) (Fort Hood, TX)
    - 752nd Ordnance Company (EOD) (Fort Hood, TX)
    - 797th Ordnance Company (EOD) (Fort Hood, TX)
  - 242nd Ordnance Battalion (EOD) (Fort Carson, CO)
    - Headquarters and Headquarters Detachment (HHD)
    - 62nd Ordnance Company (EOD) (Fort Carson, CO)
    - 663rd Ordnance Company (EOD) (Fort Carson, CO)
    - 705th Ordnance Company (EOD) (Fort Johnson, LA)
    - 749th Ordnance Company (EOD) (Fort Carson, CO)
    - 763rd Ordnance Company (EOD) (Fort Leonard Wood, MO)
    - 764th Ordnance Company (EOD) (Fort Carson, CO)
  - 21st Ordnance Company (EOD)(WMD) (Kirtland Air Force Base, NM)

==== United States Army Indo-Pacific Command (INDOPACOM) ====
Units in the United States Indo-Pacific Command are as follows.

- 303rd Ordnance Battalion (EOD) (Schofield Barracks, HI)
  - Headquarters and Headquarters Detachment (HHD)
  - 65th Ordnance Company (EOD) (Fort Wainwright, AK)
  - 74th Ordnance Company (EOD) (Schofield Barracks, HI)
  - 716th Ordnance Company (EOD) (Joint Base Elmendorf-Richardson (JBER), AK)
- Republic of Korea
  - 718th Ordnance Company (EOD) (Camp Humphreys, Republic of Korea)

United States Army European and Africa Command (USAEUR-AF)

- Germany
  - 702nd Ordnance Company (EOD) (Grafenwoehr Training Area, Germany)
  - 720th Ordnance Company (EOD) (Baumholder Army Airfield, Germany)
- Egypt
  - Task Force Sinai - EOD Detachment (Sinai, Egypt)

=== National Guard ===
- 48th Ordnance Group (EOD) (AZ) (Arizona Army National Guard) (Phoenix, AZ)
  - 157th Ordnance Battalion (EOD) (Arizona Army National Guard) (Phoenix, AZ)
    - Headquarters and Headquarters Detachment (HHD)
    - 202nd Ordnance Company (EOD) (Georgia Army National Guard) (Waynesboro, GA)
    - 221st Ordnance Company (EOD) (Florida Army National Guard) (Camp Blanding, FL)
    - 387th Ordnance Company (EOD) (Massachusetts Army National Guard) (Camp Edwards, MA)
    - 430th Ordnance Company (EOD) (North Carolina Army National Guard) (Washington, NC)
    - 745th Ordnance Company (EOD) (Michigan Army National Guard) (Camp Grayling, MI)
    - 753rd Ordnance Company (EOD) (West Virginia Army National Guard) (Camp Dawson, WV)
    - 361st Ordnance Company (EOD) (Arizona Army National Guard) (Phoenix, AZ)
    - 1003rd Ordnance Company (EOD) (Arizona Army National Guard) (Phoenix, AZ)
    - 1600th Ordnance Company (EOD) (Puerto Rico Army National Guard) (Camp Santiago, PR)
  - 501st Ordnance Battalion (EOD) (NY) (New York Army National Guard) (Glenville, NY)
    - Headquarters and Headquarters Detachment (HHD)
    - 1108th Ordnance Company (EOD) (New York Army National Guard) (Glenville, NY)
  - 741st Ordnance Battalion (EOD) (WA) (Washington Army National Guard) (Bremerton, WA)
    - Headquarters and Headquarters Detachment (HHD)
    - 217th Ordnance Company (EOD) (California Army National Guard)(Camp Roberts, CA)
    - 319th Ordnance Company (EOD) (Washington Army National Guard) (Pasco, WA)
    - 363rd Ordnance Company (EOD) (Arizona Army National Guard) (Phoenix, AZ)
    - 3665th Ordnance Company (EOD) (Nevada Army National Guard) (Las Vegas, NV)

== In popular culture ==
- The Hurt Locker (2009 film) follows a U.S. Army EOD team who are targeted by insurgents during the Iraq War, and shows their psychological reactions to the stress of combat. It was nominated for nine Academy Awards and won six, including Best Director and Best Original Screenplay, and became the first film directed by a woman to win Best Picture. It grossed $50 million worldwide.
- The Kaboom Boys (2025 book/film) follows a group of US Army Captains during WWII.

== See also ==
Explosive Ordnance Disposal - Overview of EOD

Explosive Ordnance Disposal (U.S. Navy) - Sister service EOD capability

Explosive Ordnance Disposal (U.S. Air Force) - Sister service EOD capability

Explosive Ordnance Disposal Badge - Military badge for the United States Armed Forces

20th CBRNE Command - Largest headquarters for US Army EOD

52nd Ordnance Group (EOD) - EOD Group

71st Ordnance Group (EOD) - EOD Group

NATO Explosive Ordnance Disposal Centre of Excellence (NATO EOD COE)
