= NATO Explosive Ordnance Disposal Centre of Excellence =

NATO EOD COE
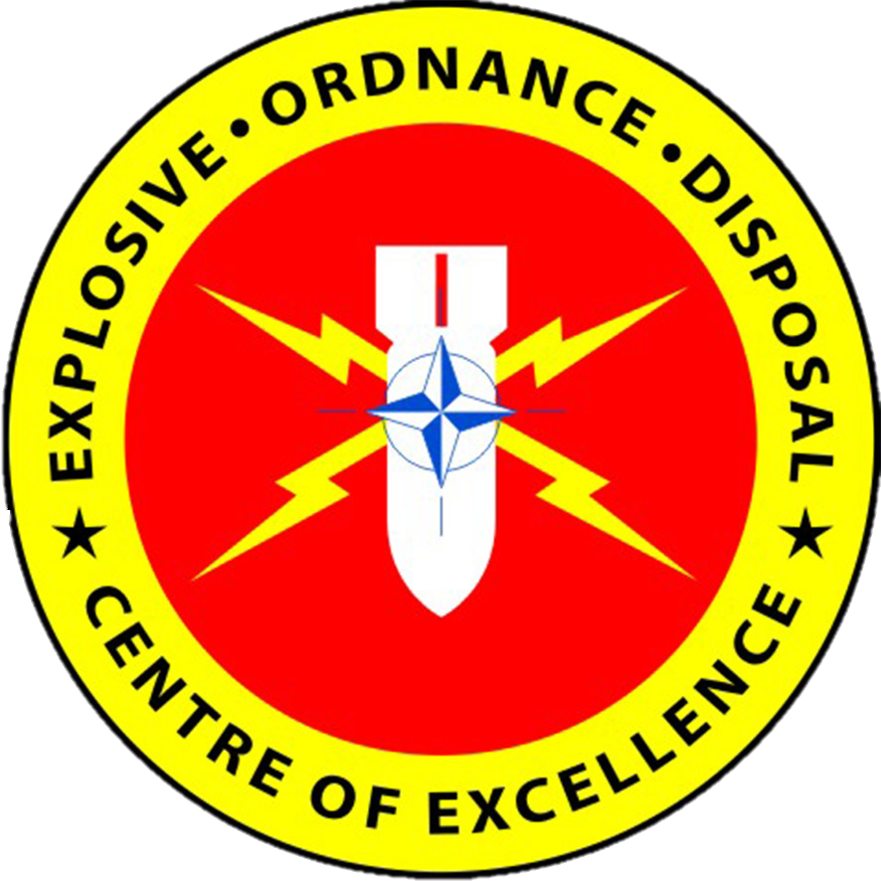
- Active: 2011
- Allegiance: NATO
- Branch: Explosive Ordnance Disposal
- Type: Centre of Excellence
- Role: Education and Training, Doctrine/Capability Development, Standardization
- Garrison/HQ: Trenčín, Slovakia

Commanders
- Current Director: Colonel František MIHALOVIČ (SVK - Army)
- Deputy Director: Lieutenant Colonel Blake ZENTENO (USA-Army)
- Chief of Staff: Colonel Zsolt SZILAGYI (HUN-RG)

== Overview ==
The NATO EOD COE is one of the tools of the NATO Supreme Allied Commander for Transformation, aiming to improve military capabilities, value, and efficiency of the NATO alliance. The North Atlantic Council approved its accreditation and was activated as an NATO Centre of Excellence on 28 April 2011. Its mission is to support and enhance NATO explosive ordnance disposal (EOD) transformation and operational efforts by improving standardization, interoperability, and cooperation throughout the NATO Alliance, with NATO partners, command elements, governmental and international organization, and other stakeholders.

== Membership ==
Framework Nation

- Slovakia

Sponsoring Nations

- Czechia
- Hungary
- Poland
- Romania
- United States

== Organization ==
The NATO EOD COE enhances NATO’s transformational and operational efforts by providing expertise and support to the Alliance, Sponsoring Nations, and other military and civilian institutions. It delivers its contributions to the Alliance’s Warfare Development efforts through its Education and Training Analysis and Lessons Learned, Concept Development, Doctrine Development and Experimentation programs.

=== Education and Training ===
The Education and Training Department supports NATO’s effort in Education, Training, Exercises and Evaluation (ETEE) policy by continuously analyzing, designing, developing, delivering, and evaluating education and training solutions for NATO personnel. Courses offered include:

- NATO EOD Doctrine Course
- NATO EOD Staff Officer Training Course
- NATO EOD Chemical Biological Radiological and Nuclear (CBRN) Incident Management Staff Officer Course
- Homemade Explosives - Basic Course
- Homemade Explosives - Advanced Course

=== Transformation Support ===
The Transformation Support Department contributes to the development, revision, and update of Allied concept, doctrine, and standardization publications.

=== Technology ===
The Technology Department facilitates the development, refinement, and procurement of EOD equipment.

== See also ==
- Allied Command Transformation
- NATO Mountain Warfare Centre of Excellence
- NATO Standardisation Office
- Bomb disposal
- Bomb suit
- TEDAX
- US Army EOD
- 52nd Ordnance Group (EOD)
- 71st Ordnance Group (EOD)
- Advanced Bomb Suit
- Anti-handling device
- Clearance diver
- Demining
- Explosive Ordnance Disposal Badge
- Fuse (explosives)
- Gegana
- US Navy EOD
- Counter-IED efforts
- Overpressure
