= Explosive ordnance disposal (United States Air Force) =

Explosive Ordnance Disposal (United States Air Force)
- Active: 1948–present
- Country: United States
- Branch: United States Air Force
- Type: Explosive ordnance disposal
- Role: Bomb disposal, CBRN defense, aircraft ordnance response, counter-IED
- Part of: Civil Engineer Squadrons (primarily); supports joint and interagency operations
- Garrison/HQ: Various Air Force installations worldwide
- Nickname: EOD
- Engagements: Korean War; Vietnam War; Persian Gulf War; Global War on Terrorism; War in Afghanistan; Iraq War; Operation Inherent Resolve

Explosive Ordnance Disposal (EOD) in the United States Air Force is the specialization responsible for detecting, identifying, evaluating, rendering safe, recovering, and disposing of conventional, improvised, chemical, biological, radiological, and nuclear (CBRN) explosive ordnance and devices. Air Force EOD technicians hold the Air Force Specialty Code (AFSC) 3E8X1 for enlisted personnel and apply specialized techniques and procedures to mitigate hazards from unexploded ordnance (UXO), improvised explosive devices (IEDs), aircraft munitions, and weapons of mass destruction.

EOD personnel are assigned primarily within civil engineer squadrons and provide support during peacetime and wartime to Air Force installations, joint forces, allies, federal agencies, and local authorities. Core missions include aerospace systems and vehicle support (such as hung ordnance on aircraft, flightline emergencies, and crash recovery), conventional munitions and range clearance, counter-IED operations, counter-weapons of mass destruction and nuclear weapons response, unexploded ordnance recovery, Defense Support of Civil Authorities, Very Important Person Protection Support Activity (including support to the president, vice president, and other dignitaries), weapons technical intelligence, and partner-nation capacity building.

Air Force EOD forms part of the joint-service EOD community. The United States Navy serves as the Department of Defense executive agent for EOD technology and training. All U.S. military EOD technicians graduate from the Naval School Explosive Ordnance Disposal.

In October 2026, Air Force EOD technicians were authorized to wear a distinctive rust-colored beret, recognizing their specialized combat arms mission and contributions to the joint force.

== History ==
Modern U.S. military EOD capabilities originated in World War II. After German aerial bombing of Britain produced large quantities of unexploded ordnance, the British developed professional bomb disposal units. American personnel from the Army, Navy, and later Army Air Forces trained with British experts beginning around 1940–1941.

United States Army Air Forces personnel received bomb disposal training and deployed with units supporting airfield operations in the European and Pacific theaters. They rendered safe Allied and enemy ordnance, cleared booby traps and mines from captured airfields, and enabled air operations.

The U.S. Air Force became an independent service in 1947. On 5 August 1948, the 4410th Bomb Disposal Unit was activated at Greenville Air Force Base, South Carolina, marking the formal beginning of the Air Force EOD program. Early missions focused on range support and flying operations.

Training consolidated under the joint Naval School Explosive Ordnance Disposal (initially at Indian Head, Maryland; later relocated to Eglin Air Force Base, Florida). Air Force EOD expanded during the Cold War to include nuclear weapons response and supported operations in Korea, Vietnam, the Persian Gulf, the Balkans, Afghanistan, Iraq, and subsequent contingencies. During the Global War on Terror, Air Force EOD technicians conducted extensive counter-IED and UXO missions, often in joint environments.

In recent years, Air Force EOD has emphasized multidomain readiness, rapid runway clearance for near-peer conflicts (drawing on World War II-era techniques), and specialized fitness standards. In November 2025, the 360th Explosive Ordnance Disposal Training Squadron was activated to consolidate EOD training under a single command.

On October 2, 2026, Chief Master Sergeant of the Air Force David R. Wolfe announced the authorization of a distinctive rust-colored beret for Air Force EOD Airmen. The announcement was made during the graduation of the inaugural Project MAMBA (Multi-domain Airmen for Modern Battlefield Application) course. The rust color is historically associated with explosive hazards, and the beret features a metallic flash incorporating EOD and Air Force symbolism (including the EOD badge, commonly called the "Crab"). The authorization aligns EOD's uniform distinction with its designation as a specialized conventional combat arms career field. Formal implementation guidance on eligibility, wear rules, and issuance timing was pending at the time of the announcement.

== Selection and training ==
=== Qualifications ===
Candidates must be U.S. citizens eligible for a Secret security clearance, possess normal color vision and depth perception, have no history of emotional instability, be able to lift more than 50 pounds, and meet ASVAB scores (typically General 64 and Mechanical 60). Physical fitness standards are rigorous; a specialized sex- and age-neutral Occupationally Specific Physical Fitness Assessment (including a 1000-meter row, 20-lb medicine ball toss, trap bar lift, and loaded movement drill) applies to EOD personnel.

=== Training pipeline ===
- Basic Military Training (approximately 7.5 weeks) at Lackland Air Force Base, Texas.
- EOD Preliminary Course (EOD Prelim; approximately 26 days) at Sheppard Air Force Base, Texas (under the 360th EOD Training Squadron). This includes intense physical conditioning, academics on EOD history and fundamentals, tool familiarization, and live demolitions.
- Naval School Explosive Ordnance Disposal (NAVSCOLEOD; approximately 143 academic days) at Eglin Air Force Base, Florida. This joint-service school covers demolition, tools and methods, core skills, ground ordnance, air ordnance (a particular emphasis for Air Force students), IEDs, chemical/biological, and radiological/nuclear topics. Navy students receive additional underwater training. Attrition rates are high.

Graduates earn the Explosive Ordnance Disposal Badge (a joint-service badge featuring a bomb, lightning bolts, shield, and wreath, nicknamed “the crab”). Basic, Senior, and Master levels exist based on experience and leadership. Air Force EOD personnel also wear the Civil Engineer occupational badge. Additional training may include advanced IED defeat, nuclear response, airborne operations, methods of entry, and flight- or mission-specific courses. Team leader validation ensures independent operational capability.

== Structure and organization ==
Air Force EOD is organized under Civil Engineer organizations at the wing, group, or squadron level. The basic operational unit is the EOD flight. Flights are postured according to mission requirements and typically range from about 10–12 personnel (smaller or in-garrison) to 17–25 (force-projection) or larger (range or major installations).

The standard team consists of 2–3 EOD-qualified technicians (one serving as team leader). Force packages are structured as Unit Type Codes (UTCs) for deployment flexibility, including lead teams, follow-on teams, and contingency support packages with vehicles, robotics, explosives, and technical data.

EOD flights support base operations, generate deployable capability for combatant commanders, and integrate with joint, interagency, and coalition forces. Larger headquarters and specialized teams handle nuclear emergency response, training (including the 360th EOD Training Squadron), and major command-level functions. Air National Guard and Air Force Reserve EOD units also contribute, particularly to homeland defense and Defense Support of Civil Authorities missions.

== Uniform and insignia ==
Air Force EOD technicians wear the joint-service Explosive Ordnance Disposal Badge. In October 2026, they were authorized a distinctive rust-colored beret. The rust color reflects the historical association with explosive hazards. The beret includes a metallic flash incorporating EOD and U.S. Air Force symbolism. This makes EOD the seventh Air Force career field authorized a distinctive beret (joining Pararescue/maroon, Combat Control/scarlet, SERE/pewter green, Special Reconnaissance/pewter gray, TACP/black, and Security Forces/blue). Formal wear policy and issuance details were under development following the announcement.

== Equipment and capabilities ==
Technicians employ bomb suits, remote-controlled robots, X-ray systems, chemical/radiological detection equipment, demolition charges, hook-and-line kits, and specialized tools. They operate across environments (urban, desert, arctic, jungle, mountain) and can support limited airborne or aerial insertion. Air Force EOD emphasizes aircraft-related hazards (such as ejection seats, bomb racks, hung munitions, and submunitions on runways) alongside the full spectrum of EOD tasks.

Air Force EOD continues to adapt to emerging threats such as explosive unmanned aerial systems while maintaining core competencies in conventional and CBRN response.

== See also ==
- Explosive ordnance disposal (United States Army)
- Explosive ordnance disposal (United States Navy)
- Bomb disposal
