= DSCA =

DSCA can refer to:

- Defense Security Cooperation Agency, a US military agency
- Defense Support of Civil authorities, a US military doctrine
