= United States Army Ordnance Corps =

U.S. Army branch charged with the supply of weapons and ammunition

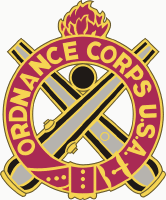
- Ordnance Corps regimental insignia
- Active: 14 May 1812 – present
- Country: United States
- Branch: United States Army
- Type: Sustainment
- Part of: United States Army Combined Arms Command
- Home of Ordnance: Fort Lee, Virginia
- Motto: "Armament for Peace"
- Colors: Crimson and Yellow

Commanders
- Chief of Ordnance: COL Charles L. Montgomery

Insignia
- Branch insignia

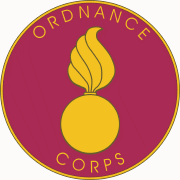
- Branch plaque

The Ordnance Corps, known as the Ordnance Department from 1812 to 1950, is a sustainment branch of the United States Army headquartered at Fort Lee, Virginia. The broad mission of the Ordnance Corps is to supply Army combat units with weapons and ammunition, including at times, their procurements and maintenance. Along with the Quartermaster Corps and Transportation Corps, it forms a critical component of the U.S. Army logistics system.

The Ordnance Corps mission is to support the development, production, acquisition, and sustainment of weapon systems, ammunition, missiles, electronics, and ground mobility materiel during peace and war to provide combat power to the U.S. Army. The officer in charge of the branch for doctrine, training, and professional development purposes is the Chief of Ordnance. The current Chief of Ordnance is Colonel Charles L. Montgomery.

== History ==
=== Colonial period to War of Independence ===
During the colonial era in America, each colony was responsible for its own supply of ordnance material and its own personnel to supervise it. The first written record of an ordnance officer in British colonial America was Samuel Sharpe in the Massachusetts Bay Colony appointed in 1629 as Master Gunner of Ordnance. By 1645, the Massachusetts Bay Colony had a permanent Surveyor of Ordnance officer. By the time of the American Revolution, every colony had their own ordnance organization responsible for the procurement, distribution, supply, storage, and maintenance of munitions for the colony.

In July 1775, Ezekiel Cheever was appointed by General George Washington as Commissary of Artillery Stores, soon to be called Commissary of Military Stores with Major General Henry Knox, the Chief of Artillery. He was the civilian in charge of ordnance support for Washington's army in the field. By the end of the American Revolution, every brigade had ordnance personnel, usually civilian, providing munitions support to the soldiers in the field.

In 1776, the Board of War and Ordnance was established to oversee the conduct of the war. This board selected Benjamin Flower to be the Commissary General of Military Stores. Benjamin Flower was given the rank of Colonel and served in that capacity throughout the American Revolution. The Commissary General of Military Stores was an echelon above the Commissary of Military Stores in the field. His responsibility was to recruit and train artificers, establish ordnance facilities, and to distribute arms and ammunition to the army in the field. In 1777, a powder magazine was established at Carlisle, Pennsylvania, and a foundry at Springfield, Massachusetts.

=== Ordnance in the early republic ===
In the early years of the 19th century, the ordnance profession played a key role in the burgeoning industrial revolution in America. In 1794, President Washington established the two federal armories; the Springfield Armory in Massachusetts and the Harpers Ferry Armory in Virginia. At these locations, early developments and innovations striving towards interchangeable parts were achieved. Inventors such as Thomas Blanchard, Simeon North, John Hall, and Eli Whitney would perfect the methods and means for mass production. Growing out of the technical innovations of the arms industry, these methods would be widely adopted by American industry by the middle of the 19th century, establishing what has become known as the American system of manufacturing.

On 14 May 1812, as part of the preparation for the War of 1812, Congress established the Ordnance Department. It was responsible for arms and ammunition production, acquisition, distribution, and storage or ordnance materiel for the U.S. Army. The act also created a new position, the Commissary General of Ordnance. Colonel Decius Wadsworth, former Superintendent of the U.S. Military Academy at West Point, was chosen as the Commissary General of Ordnance. The act also directed the new Commissary General of Ordnance, soon renamed to Chief of Ordnance, to "enlist artisans and laborers to direct the inspection and proof of all cannon and small arms to direct the construction of gun carriages equipments implements and ammunition to make estimates and contracts for and purchases of ordnance supplies and stores and to issue them to the army to exact from armories and arsenals quarterly returns of property and to receive from all responsible officers reports of damages to ordnance materiel to establish ordnance depots to prepare regulations for the government of the Ordnance Department and forms of returns and reports".

Wadsworth also took great care in establishing and supervising the training of officers who would join the Ordnance Department. Coming from West Point, these officers, such as Alfred Mordecai and George Bomford, were highly trained in mechanical and chemical engineering and were among the highest ranking of graduating cadets from West Point. These new ordnance officers were usually detailed to the Springfield or Harpers Ferry Armory, or to one of the various arsenals across the growing country, to conduct scientific and industrial experiments in metallurgy, chemistry, or one of the allied engineering fields.

In 1832, the Ordnance Department established the non-commissioned officer rank of Ordnance Sergeant to be in charge of the ordnance stores at any of the growing number of Army forts and establishments across the country. This rank remained until the reorganization of the Army under the National Defense Act of 1920.

During the Mexican–American War, the Ordnance Department established the Ordnance Rocket and Howitzer Battery to service the then new M1841 12-pound howitzers and Hale war rockets, which had not yet entered Army service and were still being tested. This was the only Ordnance unit established primarily for a combat role. This unit included junior Army officers who would serve as senior leaders in the Civil War; including Jesse Reno and Benjamin Huger.

=== Civil War and post Civil War ===
During the war, the Ordnance Department furnished 90 million pounds of lead, 13 million pounds of artillery projectiles, and 26 million pounds of powder for a Union Army of over 1 million soldiers. However, despite the growth of the Army, the Ordnance Department did not grow in a corresponding manner. By the end of the war, it numbered only 64 officers and approximately 600 soldiers, officially. Yet, to support the ordnance needs of the Army, officers and soldiers who had civilian experience in ordnance responsibilities (i.e. blacksmiths, etc ...) were assigned additional duty in their units, so that every unit, company-echelon and above, had someone assigned in ordnance responsibilities.

For those few ordnance officers who had been part of the pre-war Army, several of them accepted line positions, such as Major Generals Oliver O. Howard and Jesse Reno. Most, however, remained in the Ordnance Department and rose in rank to serve as ordnance officers at one of the various arsenals or senior ordnance command for the Union Army, i.e. in the Army of the Potomac. About half of the ordnance officers left to join the Confederacy, including its sole Chief of Ordnance during the war, Josiah Gorgas.

By 1872, the Ordnance Department reflected the Army's return to a small peacetime status with 50 officers, 475 enlisted soldiers, and 1,738 civilian workers. Despite this constriction, the Ordnance Department continued its tradition of technological innovation and increased professionalism. Ordnance officers, including the Chiefs of Ordnance – Stephen Vincent Benet, Daniel Flagler, Adelbert Rinaldo Buffington – refined, improved, and even invented new ordnance materiel. Steel breech-loading artillery, machine gun development, smokeless powder, improved gun carriages, officer promotion via examination, and training through apprenticeship at government arsenals and shops characterized the Ordnance Department during the latter 19th century. In 1874, the first dedicated proving ground was established at Sandy Hook, New Jersey. Watervliet Arsenal was chosen as the location for the first federal cannon foundry in 1887 and a seacoast cannon shop was added in 1889.

=== World War I ===
Even though World War I had been raging in Europe for nearly three years, the Ordnance Department had to play catch-up when the United States entered the war. With only 97 officers and 1,241 enlisted soldiers, the department had a myriad of problems to overcome:

- no system below the Office of the Chief of Ordnance to coordinate with industry,
- no plan for mobilizing industry,
- an inadequate proving ground,
- no system of echeloned maintenance,
- a lack of sufficient schooling for enlisted Soldiers,
- and only 6 armories and manufacturing arsenals at Watervliet; Springfield and Watertown, Massachusetts; Picatinny, New Jersey; Frankford, Pennsylvania; and Rock Island, Illinois.

However, by the end of the war, it had solved all these problems, matured as an organization, and adapted to modern, mechanized warfare. It established an embryonic process for echelon-based maintenance for field units, a tradition of ordnance education at one of the officer or enlisted ordnance schools, a new proving ground at Aberdeen, Maryland, and a plan to coordinate production and mobilize industry.

The Ordnance Department established 13 Ordnance districts across the country that had the authority to deal directly with industry and award contracts. By the end of the war, almost 8,000 plants were working on Ordnance contracts. To offset industry's reluctance to build new plants, the U.S. Government established a system of constructing the factories but contracting out their operation. By the war's end, 326 Government facilities were operating under the auspices of contractors. This practice would be employed even more successfully during World War II.

By the end of the war, the Ordnance Department numbered 5,954 officers and 62,047 enlisted soldiers, with 22,700 of those officers and soldiers serving in the American Expeditionary Force in France.

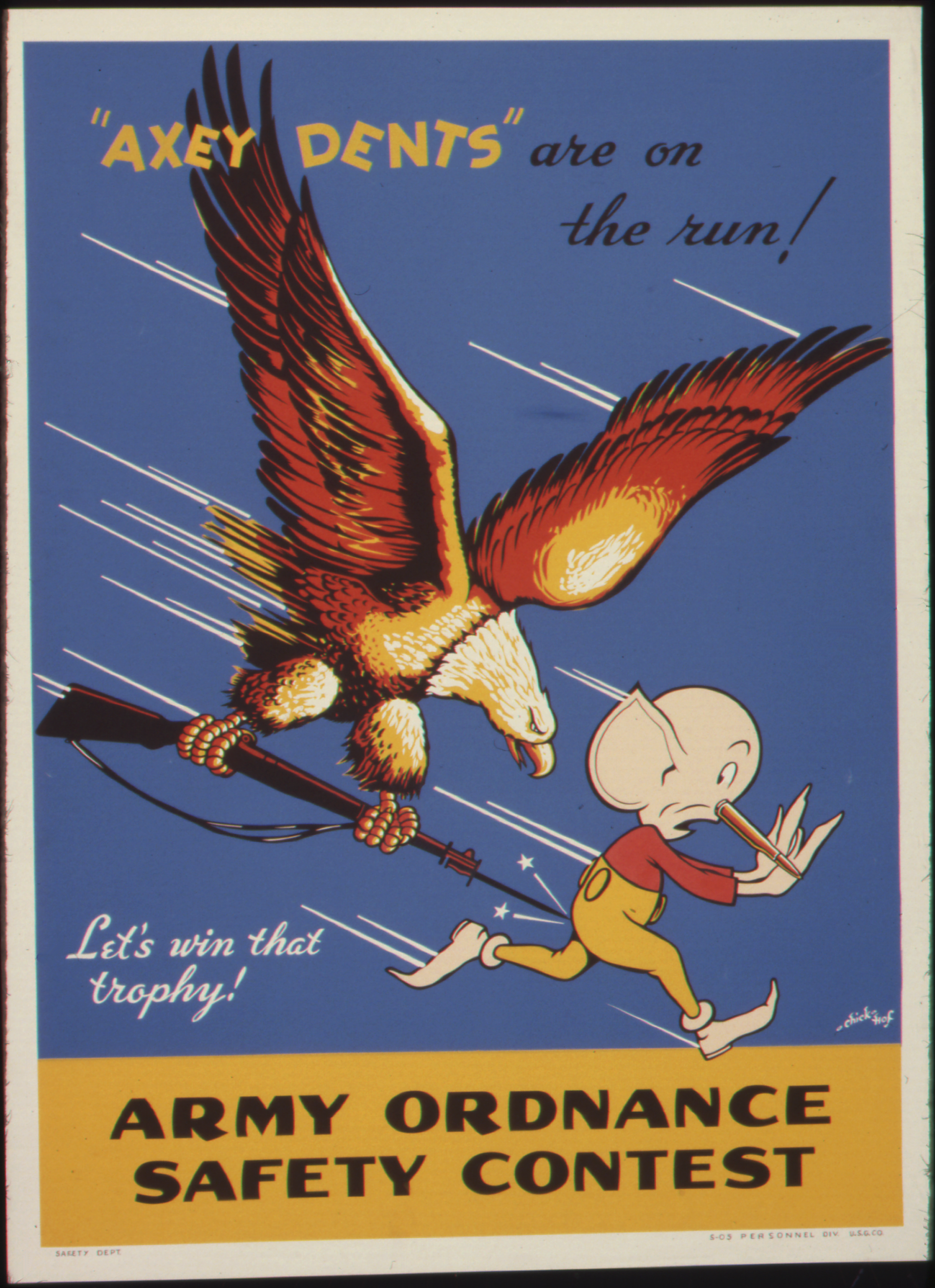
A safety campaign around ordnance by U.S. Army published during the height of World War II (c. 1942–1943) by the War Production Board

=== World War II ===
During World War II, the Ordnance Department was responsible for roughly half of all Army procurement, $34 billion. President Franklin Delano Roosevelt's 'Arsenal of Democracy' depended on the Ordnance Department to become a reality. Ordnance Department strength increased from 334 officers to 24,000 officers, 4,000 enlisted to 325,000 enlisted, and 27,088 civilians to 262,000 civilians. Ordnance soldiers and civilians worked across the globe, in places as diverse as Iceland, Iran, the Pacific Islands, Africa, Europe, and the Middle East. Aberdeen Proving Ground expanded exponentially and headquartered The Ordnance School, the Ordnance Replacement Training Center, the new Bomb Disposal School, and the Ordnance Unit Training Center.

The ordnance mission in the field operated on a scale never experienced previously by the Ordnance Department. During World War II, the Ordnance Branch gained its third core competency, Bomb Disposal (renamed Explosive Ordnance Disposal after WWII) added to its previous missions of ammunition handling and maintenance. By war's end, there were more than 2,200 ordnance units of approximately 40 types, ranging in size from squads to regiments.

Beginning in 1942, with the authorization of the Chief of Ordnance, a computing branch at the University of Pennsylvania's Moore School of Electrical Engineering was established as a substation of Aberdeen Proving Ground under the code name "Project PX". On 15 February 1946, the Electronic Numerical Integrator and Computer (ENIAC), the world's first general-purpose electronic computer, was formally dedicated. ENIAC was designed to calculate artillery firing tables for the United States Army Ballistic Research Laboratory. The ENIAC's first use was in calculations for the hydrogen bomb.

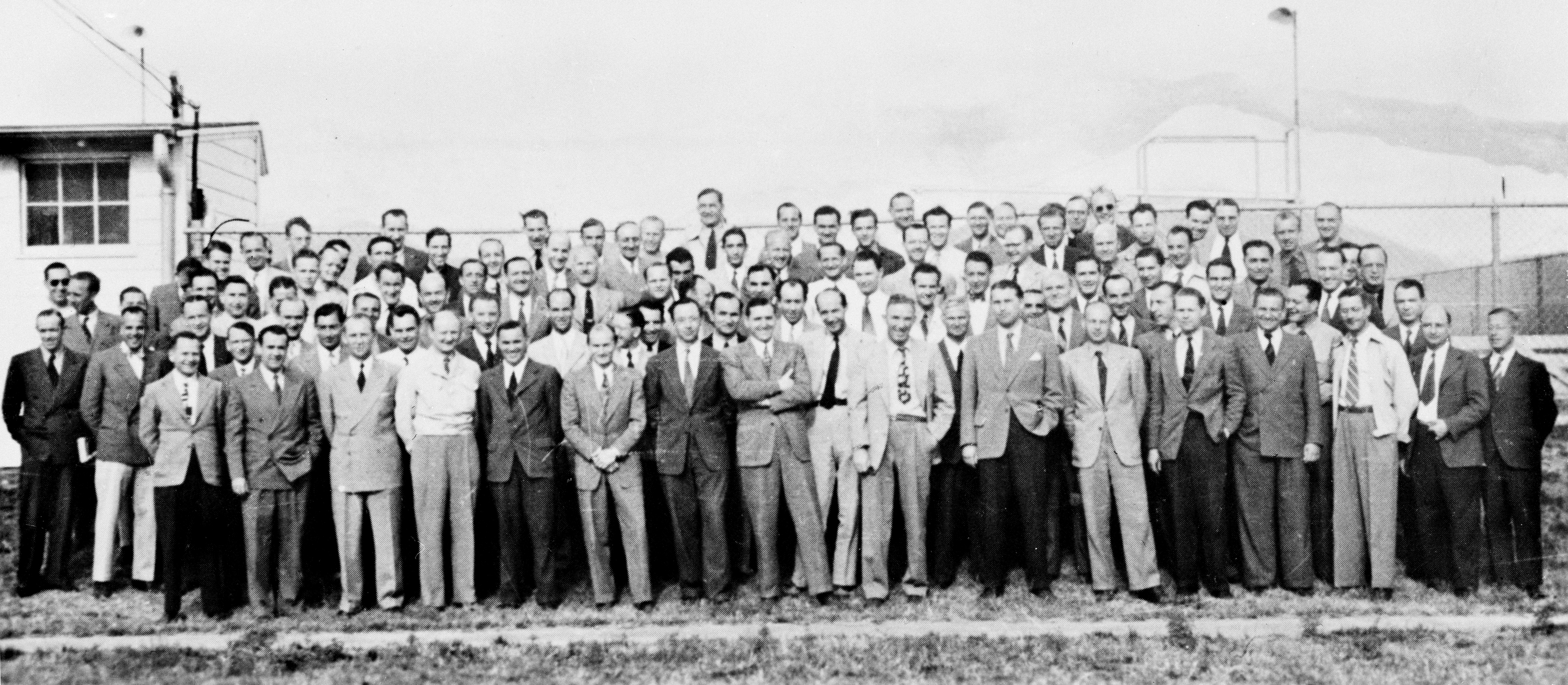
Operation Paperclip scientists of the Ordnance Rocket Center

In August 1945, Colonel Holger Toftoy, head of the Rocket Branch of the Research and Development Division of the US Army's Ordnance Department, offered initial one-year contracts to German rocket scientists as part of Operation Paperclip, a program used to recruit the scientists from Nazi Germany for employment by the United States; 127 of them accepted. In September 1945, the first group of seven rocket scientists arrived at Fort Strong, New York and then moving to Fort Bliss, Texas, in January 1946.

In 1949, the German scientists were transferred from the White Sands Missile Range Fort Bliss Range Complex to the Redstone Arsenal Ordnance Rocket Center.

=== Post-war era ===
Per the Army Reorganization Act of 1950, the Ordnance Department was renamed the Ordnance Corps. With the outbreak of the Korean War, the Ordnance Corps largely re-established its successful procedures from World War II. It reactivated the various schools and units at Aberdeen Proving Ground, which had been dis-established following the end of World War II, to serve the Korea effort. It continued its tradition of echeloned-based maintenance and increased the rapidity of maintenance and ammunition supply and repair. Explosive Ordnance Disposal, formerly Bomb Disposal Squads, improved their procedures with a focus on Russian and Chinese ordnance.

In Vietnam, the capabilities of Explosive Ordnance Disposal became increasingly important due to the nature of a war with no front lines. EOD and other ordnance units work under the auspices of the 1st Logistical Command, which divided the country into four support zones. Despite the difficult circumstances, the operational readiness rates increased and by 1969 exceeded those of previous wars.

=== From 1962 to 2008 ===
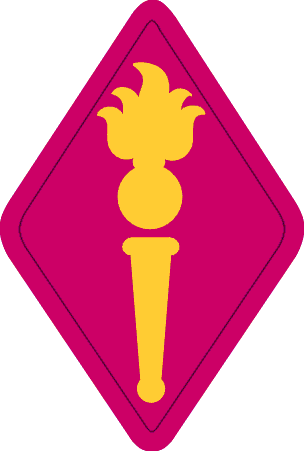
United States Army Ordnance Center and School SSI

In 1962, the Ordnance Corps and the office of the Chief of Ordnance were disestablished as part of a massive reorganization of the Department of the Army. Following the recommendations of the Hoelscher Committee or Project 80, the Army aimed to streamline its logistical operations by separating personnel management from technical development. The Ordnance Branch (along with the Transportation and Quartermaster Branches) was placed under the supervision of the Army's Deputy Chief of Staff for Logistics. The Army Materiel Command (AMC) assumed responsibility for Ordnance's tasks of research and development; procurement, production, and storage; and technical intelligence. Combat Development Command assumed responsibility for developing the Army's organization and doctrine. The Ordnance Center and School trained personnel in ammunition handling, maintenance, and Explosive Ordnance Disposal and was under the direction of Continental Army Command (CONARC).

During this period of disestablishment, the Ordnance branch faced major operational tests in the Vietnam War. Ordnance soldiers were tasked with providing tactical maintenance and managing vast ammunition stockpiles across an asymmetric jungle battlefield. Despite facing significant rates of insurgent sabotage and a lack of a centralized command structure, ordnance logistics units successfully adapted. They reached peaks in equipment readiness rates by 1969 while simultaneously tackling the growing threat of improvised booby traps through localized Explosive Ordnance Disposal (EOD) actions.

By the early 1980s, the lack of a centralized branch identity and unified professional development began to impact logistics cohesion. Recognizing these challenges, the Army adopted the Branch Regimental Concept to restore heritage and unified leadership to its technical branches. The Ordnance Corps was officially reestablished on 28 October 1985. This restoration brought back the position of the Chief of Ordnance and consolidated all ordnance training, doctrine development, and school commands back under a single unified regimental home, initially centered at Aberdeen Proving Ground, Maryland.

=== Post-Cold War ===
In 2008, the Ordnance Corps consolidated the Ordnance Mechanical Maintenance School from Aberdeen Proving Ground and the United States Army Ordnance Munitions and Electronic Maintenance School from Redstone Arsenal into a single training facility based at Fort Lee, Virginia as a part of the 2005 Base Closure and Realignment Commission (BRAC) decision. With an entirely new campus dedicated to the training of all ranks of ordnance soldiers and civilians, the Ordnance Corps maintains its commitment to the life-cycle sustainment of the Army's materiel from cradle to grave, providing ammunition, and protecting the Army's forces through EOD operations.

== Heraldic items and traditions ==
=== Branch insignia ===
Ordnance Corps branch insignia

The Ordnance Corps branch insignia is represented by the "shell and flame". It is considered to be the oldest branch insignia in the U.S. Army. This symbol has been used since the 17th century by various armies of Western Europe, including British and French forces, and was considered a common symbol used by the military. Ordnance officers began wearing the symbol in 1832 and have been wearing it ever since. There have been a multiplicity of designs throughout the years, but the current design was adopted in 1936.

=== Branch plaque ===
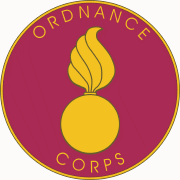
Ordnance Corps branch plaque

The Ordnance Corps plaque design has the branch insignia, title letters, and rim in gold. The background is crimson.

=== Regimental insignia ===
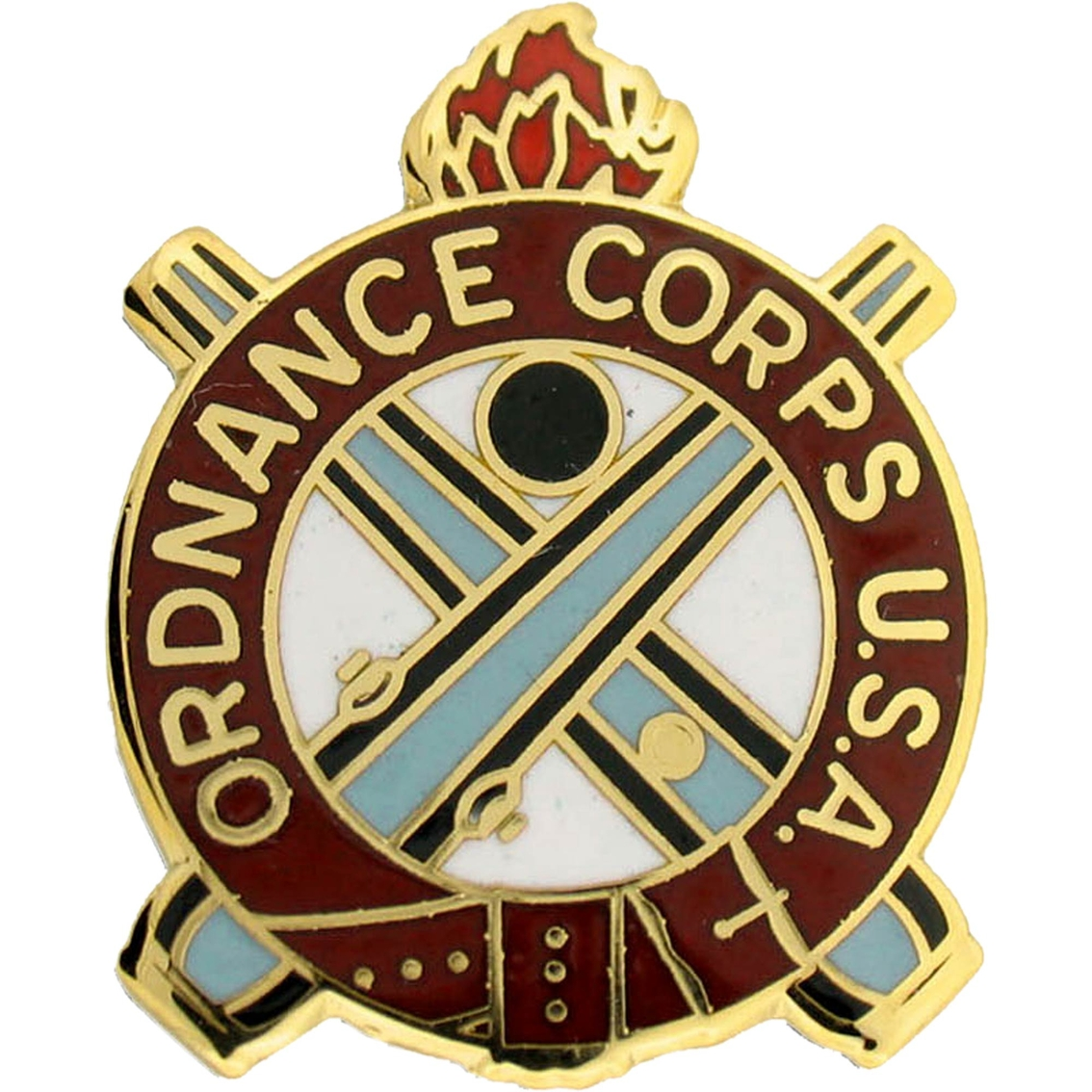
Ordnance Corps regimental insignia

The origin of the Ordnance Corps regimental insignia is unknown. The first example of it appears on a button dated to 1833. By the mid-19th century, the insignia was widely used on documents of the Ordnance Corps. The insignia was approved as the regimental insignia for the newly re-established Ordnance Corps by the Institute of Heraldry on 25 March 1986.

The regimental insignia of the Ordnance Corps is a gold-color metal and enamel device 1 1/8 inches in height overall, consisting of two gray antique cannons in saltire on a white disc, behind an encircling scroll in the form of a buckle red belt with, between the intersecting cannons and the belt, a black antique bomb, its scarlet flames issuing at the top of the device from behind the belt, which bears the inscription "Ordnance Corps U.S.A." in gold letters. It is worn on the right side of the uniform, above any unit citations.

The crossed cannons are representative of the Ordnance Corps's early relationship to artillery. The flaming bomb, also known as the shell and flame, represents the armament of days gone by, while the energy it connotes is applicable to the weapons of our own day. The cannoneer's belt, which encircles the flaming bomb and crossed cannons, is embossed with the words "ORDNANCE CORPS U.S.A." and represents the traditional association between munitions and armament. The white background symbolizes the Ordnance Corps's motto, "Armament for Peace".

=== Branch colors ===
Crimson was prescribed as the Ordnance color in 1851. In 1902, the Ordnance colors changed to black and scarlet. Crimson and yellow were established as the branch colors on 14 October 1921.

=== Ordnance soldier's creed ===
As an Ordnance Soldier of the United States Army, I will utilize every available talent and means to ensure that superior mobility, firepower, and communications are advantages enjoyed by the United States Army over its enemies. As an Ordnance Soldier, I fully understand my duty to perform under adverse conditions and I will continually strive to perfect my craft. I will remain flexible so that I can meet any emergency. In my conduct, I will abide by the Soldier's code. In my support mission in the field, I will use every available skill to maintain superiority; I will always be tactically and technically proficient As an Ordnance soldier, I have no greater task.

=== Army ordnance song ===
The words and music to Arms for the Love of America were originally composed by Irving Berlin and published by the Army Ordnance Association in 1941. It was dedicated to Major General C.M. Wesson, the Chief of Ordnance from 1938 to 1942.

On land and on the sea and in the air
We've gotta be there, we've gotta be there
America is sounding her alarm
We've gotta have arms, we've gotta have arms

Arms for the love of America!
They speak in a foreign land, with weapons in every hand
Whatever they try, we've gotta reply
In language that they understand

Arms for the love of America!
And for the love of every mother's cherished one
Who's depending on the work that must be done
By the force behind the force behind the gun

— Lyrics to Arms for the Love of America

=== The Ordnance Order of Samuel Sharpe ===
The purpose of the Ordnance Order of Samuel Sharpe is to recognize those individuals who have served the United States Army Ordnance Corps with demonstrated integrity, moral character and professional competence over a sustained period of time. And whose selfless contributions to the Corps stand out in the eyes of their seniors, peers and subordinates alike.

— Samuel Sharpe selection criteria

On 26 February 1628, the Court of Assistants in London, England directed that "five pieces of ordnance and a great quantity of other arms and great shot" belonging to a settlement near modern-day Salem, Massachusetts be placed under the control of Mr. Samuel Sharpe, making him the first European "Master Gunner of our Ordnance" on the American continent.

== U.S. Army Ordnance Corps personnel ==
=== Chiefs of Ordnance ===
The head of the Ordnance Corps Branch is the Chief of Ordnance. In addition, the Ordnance Corps Command Sergeant Major and the Ordnance Corps Chief Warrant Officer assist the Chief of Ordnance with the supervising of the health, training, and welfare of the Soldiers, Warrant Officers, and Officers of the Ordnance Branch. In addition, the Chief of Ordnance holds a secondary hat as the Commandant of the Ordnance School at Fort Gregg-Adams. As of 2020, there have been 42 Chiefs of Ordnance in the U.S. Army.

=== Commissioned officer areas of concentration (AOC) ===
- 89E Explosive Ordnance Disposal Officer
- 91A Materiel Maintenance and Munitions Management Officer

=== Warrant officer military occupational specialties ===
- 890A Ammunition Warrant Officer
- 913A Armament Systems Maintenance Warrant Officer
- 914A Allied Trades Warrant Officer
- 915A Automotive Maintenance Warrant Officer
- 915E Senior Ordnance Logistics Warrant Officer
- 919A Engineer Equipment Maintenance Warrant Officer
- 948B Electronics System Maintenance Warrant Officer
- 948D Electronic Missile Systems Maintenance Warrant Officer
- 948E Senior Electronics Maintenance Warrant Officer

=== Enlisted military occupational specialties (MOS) ===
- 89A Ammunition Stock Control and Accounting Specialist
- 89B Ammunition Specialist
- 89D Explosive Ordnance Disposal Specialist
- 91A M1 ABRAMS Tank System Maintainer
- 91B Wheeled Vehicle Mechanic
- 91C Utilities Equipment Repairer
- 91D Tactical Power Generation Equipment Repairer
- 91E Allied Trades Specialist
- 91F Small Arms/Towed Artillery Repairer
- 91H Track Vehicle Repairer
- 91J Quartermaster and Chemical Equipment Repairer
- 91L Construction Equipment Repairer
- 91M Bradley Fighting Vehicle System Maintainer
- 91P Self-Propelled Artillery Systems Maintainer
- 91S Stryker Systems Maintainer
- 91X Maintenance Supervisor
- 91Z Senior Maintenance Supervisor
- 94A Land Combat Electronic Missile System Repairer
- 94D Air Traffic Control Equipment Repairer
- 94E Radio and Communications Security Repairer
- 94F Computer/Detection Systems Repairer
- 94H Test, Measurement, and Diagnostic Equipment (TMDE) Maintenance Support Specialist
- 94M Radar Repairer
- 94P Multiple Launch Rocket System (MLRS) Repairer
- 94R Avionics and Survivability Equipment Repairer
- 94S Patriot System Repairer
- 94T Avenger System Repairer
- 94W Electronic Maintenance Supervisor
- 94Y Automated Test Set (ATS) Operator/Maintainer
- 94Z Senior Electronic Maintenance Supervisor

== The Ordnance Training and Heritage Center ==
The United States Army Ordnance Museum was formed at Aberdeen Proving Ground, Maryland in 1919. In 2010, the museum was closed and reformed at Fort Lee as the U.S. Army Ordnance Training and Heritage Center.

== Units ==
=== Ordnance ===
- Headquarters and Headquarters Company, 63rd Ordnance Battalion
- Headquarters and Headquarters Company, 79th Ordnance Battalion
- Headquarters and Headquarters Company, 184th Ordnance Battalion (EOD)
- Headquarters and Headquarters Detachment, 242nd Ordnance Battalion (EOD)
- Headquarters and Headquarters Detachment, 320th Ordnance Battalion
- Headquarters and Headquarters Detachment, 303rd Ordnance Battalion (EOD)
- Headquarters and Headquarters Company, 332nd Ordnance Battalion
- Headquarters and Headquarters Company, 441st Ordnance Battalion
- 8th Ordnance Company
- 13th Ordnance Company
- 17th Ordnance Company
- 18th Ordnance Company (EOD)
- 23rd Ordnance Company
- 24th Ordnance Company
- 21st Ordnance Company (EOD) (WMD)
- 28th Ordnance Company (EOD) (Airborne)
- 38th Ordnance Company (EOD)
- 49th Ordnance Company (EOD)
- 55th Ordnance Company (EOD)
- 60th Ordnance Company
- 62nd Ordnance Company (EOD)
- 65th Ordnance Company (EOD)
- 74th Ordnance Company (EOD)
- 162nd Ordnance Company
- 202nd Ordnance Company
- 217th Ordnance Company
- 266th Ordnance Company
- 592nd Ordnance Company
- 630th Ordnance Company (EOD)
- 663rd Ordnance Company (EOD)
- 664th Ordnance Company
- 702nd Ordnance Company (EOD)
- 704th Ordnance Company (EOD)
- 705th Ordnance Company (EOD)
- 706th Ordnance Company
- 707th Ordnance Company (EOD)
- 717th Ordnance Company (EOD)
- 720th Ordnance Company (EOD)
- 722nd Ordnance Company (EOD)
- 723rd Ordnance Company (EOD)
- 725th Ordnance Company
- 731st Ordnance Company
- 734th Ordnance Company (EOD)
- 741st Ordnance Company (EOD)
- 744th Ordnance Company (EOD)
- 748th Ordnance Company
- 749th Ordnance Company (EOD)
- 754th Ordnance Company (EOD)
- 756th Ordnance Company (EOD)
- 759th Ordnance Company (EOD)
- 760th Ordnance Company (EOD)
- 763rd Ordnance Company (EOD)
- 764th Ordnance Company (EOD)
- 774th Ordnance Company (EOD)
- 787th Ordnance Company (EOD)
- 788th Ordnance 4s patrCompany
- 789th Ordnance Company (EOD)
- 3670th Ordnance Company
- 221st Ordnance Detachment
- 745th Ordnance Detachment
- Headquarters and Headquarters Company, 38th Ordnance Group
- Headquarters and Headquarters Detachment, 52nd Ordnance Group
- Headquarters and Headquarters Detachment, 71st Ordnance Group
- Headquarters and Headquarters Detachment, 111th Ordnance Group

=== Maintenance ===
- Headquarters and Headquarters Detachment, 326th Maintenance Battalion
- 1st Maintenance Company
- 5th Maintenance Company
- 110th Maintenance Company
- 115th Maintenance Company
- 147th Maintenance Company
- 152nd Maintenance Company
- 170th Maintenance Company
- 183rd Maintenance Company
- 211th Maintenance Company
- 245th Maintenance Company
- 267th Maintenance Company
- 276th Maintenance Company
- 367th Maintenance Company
- 417th Maintenance Company
- 503rd Maintenance Company
- 512th Maintenance Company
- 514th Maintenance Company
- 546th Maintenance Company
- 584th Maintenance Company
- 596th Maintenance Company
- 598th Maintenance Company
- 602nd Maintenance Company
- 642nd Maintenance Company
- 651st Maintenance Company
- 659th Maintenance Company
- 694th Maintenance Company
- 771st Maintenance Company
- 778th Maintenance Company
- 1071st Maintenance Company
- 1073rd Maintenance Company
- 1120th Maintenance Company
- 3625th Maintenance Company
- 3654th Maintenance Company
- 3664th Maintenance Company
- 3673rd Maintenance Company
