= 303rd Ordnance Battalion (EOD) =

U.S. Army explosive ordnance disposal unit

303rd Ordnance Battalion (Explosive Ordnance Disposal)
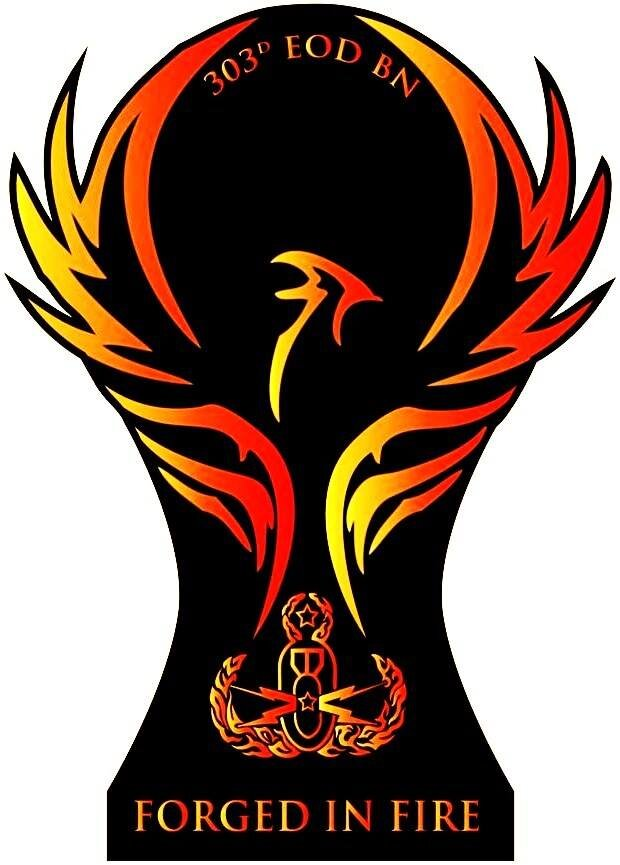
- Unofficial unit logo
- Active: 16 October 2009- Present
- Country: United States
- Branch: United States Army
- Type: Sustainment and support
- Role: Explosive ordnance disposal
- Size: Battalion
- Part of: 8th Military Police Brigade, 8th Theater Sustainment Command, United States Army Pacific Command via the United States Army Ordnance Corps
- Garrison/HQ: Schofield Barracks
- Nickname: 303D OD BN (EOD)
- Motto: "Forged in Fire- Ready to Protect" "HO’OHANOHANO"
- Colors: Red, gold, and black
- Mascot: The Phoenix

Commanders
- Battalion Commander: CPT Brigid McPheters
- Command Sergeant Major: SGT Edwin Soto

The 303rd Ordnance Battalion (Explosive Ordnance Disposal) (often shortened to 303D OD BN (EOD)) is one of nine explosive ordnance disposal (EOD) battalions of the United States Army, with a lineage dating back to World War II. As of 2026, it is the only U.S. Army EOD battalion stationed outside the continental United States.

== Activation ==
The battalion was reactivated on September 15, 2009, during a ceremony at Schofield Barracks, Hawaii. This reactivation marked the first time the unit’s colors were unfurled since its inactivation in Germany in 1976. At the time of its reactivation, the battalion was composed of the Headquarters and Headquarters Detachment, along with two companies: the 74th and the 706th. It operates under the 8th Military Police Brigade, which is part of the 8th Theater Sustainment Command.

== Mission ==
- The 303D OD BN (EOD) deploys and exercises mission command of EOD and CBRN forces to support Multi-Domain Operations across all Warfighting Functions and throughout all phases of operations in the USINDOPACOM area of responsibility.
- Provides EOD and CBRN support to Operation Pathways and USINDOPACOM security cooperation initiatives to create interoperability of Partners and Allies.
- Provides Defense Support to Civil Authorities to mitigate explosive and CBRN threats to civilians in U.S. territories within USINDOPACOM area of responsibility.
- Provides support to Defense POW/MIA Accounting Agency to mitigate explosive threats and facilitate the search and recovery of missing personnel.
- Provides support to USINDOPACOM Humanitarian Mine Action missions. Provides EOD support to the U.S. Secret Service in the protection of identified U.S. and foreign dignitaries worldwide.

== Subordinate units ==
- 65th Ordnance Company (EOD), Fort Wainwright, AK
- 71st Chemical Response Company, Schofield Barracks, HI
- 74th Ordnance Company (EOD), Schofield Barracks, HI
- 706th Ordnance Company (EOD), Schofield Barracks, HI*
- 716th Ordnance Company (EOD), Joint Base Elmendorf-Richardson

== Lineage ==
- Constituted 3 April 1944 in the Army of the United States as Headquarters and Headquarters Detachment, 303d Ordnance Battalion
- Activated 15 May 1944 at Camp Maxey, Texas
- Inactivated 30 January 1946 on Okinawa
- Allotted 27 November 1946 to the Organized Reserves.
- Activated 7 December 1946 at Fort Collins, Colorado
- Location changed 15 February 1948 to Detroit, Michigan (Organized Reserves redesignated 25 March 1948 as the Organized Reserve Corps; redesignated 9 July 1952 as the Army Reserve)
- Inactivated 15 November 1950 at Detroit, Michigan
- Activated 19 October 1955 at Saginaw, Michigan
- Inactivated 1 May 1959 at Saginaw, Michigan
- Redesignated 31 December 1966 as Headquarters and Headquarters Detachment, 303d Maintenance Battalion; concurrently allotted to the Regular Army and activated in Germany
- Inactivated 21 January 1976 in Germany.
- Redesignated 1 May 2007 as Headquarters and Headquarters Detachment, 303d Ordnance Battalion
- Activated 16 October 2009 at Schofield Barracks, Hawaii

== Training and Partnerships ==
- The 303rd Ordnance Battalion collaborated in partnerships and capability-sharing initiatives with allied nations. In January 2017, the battalion held a subject matter expert exchange with members of the Japan Ground Self-Defense Force. This exercise trained soldiers on counter-improvised explosive device (C-IED) techniques, with demonstrations of specialized equipment, including robots and X-ray systems.
- The 303rd Ordnance Battalion (EOD) participated in Operation Render Safe 2023. A multinational effort focused on the disposal of unexploded ordnance (UXO) and explosive remnants of war (ERW) in Papua New Guinea. The exercise focused on technical expertise, coordination, and disposal operations alongside partner forces from Australia, Canada, New Zealand, and the United Kingdom. This exercise was formed create international cooperation in EOD operations and address historical UXO hazards in the region.
- The 303rd Ordnance Battalion (EOD) and the 716th Ordnance Company (EOD) participated in a joint training exercise with the Royal Thai Armed Forces, focusing on explosive ordnance disposal (EOD) operations as part of ongoing U.S.-Thailand military cooperation. The training, detailed in a U.S. Indo-Pacific Command article, focused on interoperability, exchange technical expertise, and response capabilities for handling hazardous munitions.

== Unit Lineage and Honors ==
The 303rd Ordnance Battalion originates back to World War II, with a history of contributions to explosive ordnance disposal. Since its establishment, the unit has undergone several activations and inactivations, with its most recent reactivation occurring in 2009, and still currently conducting EOD operations in the Pacific region.

== Distinctive Unit Insignia ==
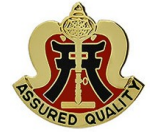
(Pictured). The 303D Ordnance Battalion Unit Crest

=== Description ===
A gold color metal and enamel device 1 1/8 inches (2.86 cm) in width overall consisting of a black Torii gate surmounted by a gold spanner within an encircling gold scroll inscribed “ASSURED QUALITY” in black letters, the ends of the scroll terminating at the head of the spanner, all on a crimson background. The DUI was approved in 1969 for the 303rd Maintenance Battalion and redesignated in 2009 for the 303rd Ordnance Battalion (EOD).

== Notable Events ==
• Inactivation of the 706th EOD Company: On August 3, 2016, the battalion held an inactivation ceremony for the 706th Ordnance Company (EOD) at Schofield Barracks, Hawaii. The company has an operational history from participation in World War II and the Global War on Terrorism.

• Redeployment of the 71st Chemical Company: In November 2022, the 71st Chemical Company returned to Schofield Barracks following a nine-month deployment to the Republic of South Korea. During this rotation, the company participated in various training missions, including decontamination exercises and combined arms training.

• 74th Explosive Ordnance Disposal Company, 303D Ordnance Battalion, Wins USARPAC Team of the Year Competition Two Years Running (2016).

== Honors and Decorations ==
=== Honors ===
- Campaign Participation Credits
- World War II- Asiatic-Pacific Theater
- War on Terrorism

=== Decorations ===
- Meritorious Unit Commendation
