= 3rd Ordnance Battalion =

- Distinctive unit insignia
- Country: United States of America
- Branch: United States Army
- Type: Ordnance
- Role: Explosive Ordnance Disposal
- HQ: Joint Base Lewis–McChord, Washington
- Nickname: Nighthawks
- Mottos: Service, Not Glory
- Decorations: Valorous Unit Award Meritorious Unit Commendation Superior Unit Award

Commanders
- Current commander: LTC Louis C. Hare
- Command Sergeant Major: CSM Tim Haar

Insignia
- Coat of arms

The 3rd Ordnance Battalion (Explosive Ordnance Disposal) (unofficially referred to as the 3rd Explosive Ordnance Disposal Battalion) is a unit of the United States Army currently stationed at Joint Base Lewis–McChord. It is assigned to the 71st Ordnance Group at Fort Carson, Colorado, which is under the 20th Chemical, Biological, Radiological, Nuclear, and Explosive (CBRNE) Command, Aberdeen Proving Grounds, Maryland.

== Heraldry ==
=== Distinctive unit insignia ===
A Gold color metal and enamel device 1 5/32 inches (2.9 cm) in height overall consisting of a shield blazoned: Gules, on a bend between a spur gear and a feather palm tree, Or, three torteaux. Attached below the shield a Red scroll turned Gold inscribed "SERVICE, NOT GLORY" in Gold letters.

Crimson (red) and yellow (gold) are the colors of the Ordnance Branch. The torteaux, simulating cannon balls, allude to the numerical designation of the unit. The spur gear represents maintenance, and the palm tree is characteristic of the flora of the countryside where the battalion was organized, Monterey Bay, California.

The distinctive unit insignia was originally approved for the 3d Ordnance Battalion (Maintenance) on 26 August 1942. It was redesignated for the 3d Ordnance Battalion on 14 April 1955.

=== Coat of arms ===
- Shield: Gules (Crimson), on a bend between a spur gear and a feather palm tree Or, three torteaux of the field.
- Crest: From a wreath Or and Gules (Crimson), a shell palewise Sable charged with four mullets in pale of the second, flanked on either side by two pheons Proper.
- Motto: Service Not Glory
- Symbolism:
  - Shield: The background is crimson and the bend is yellow, the colors of the Ordnance Branch. The torteaux, simulating cannon balls, allude to the numerical designation of the unit. The spur gear represents maintenance, and the palm tree is characteristic of the flora of the countryside where the battalion was organized, i.e., Southern California.
  - Crest: Crimson and yellow are the colors traditionally used by Ordnance. The shell suggests ammunition, highlighting the mission of the battalion as explosive and ammunition disposal. It is charged with four stars symbolizing the unit's decorations. The two pheons represent the organization's service in World War II and Vietnam.
- Background: The coat of arms was originally approved for the 3rd Ordnance Battalion on 14 September 1942. It was rescinded on 14 April 1955. It was reinstated for the 3rd Ordnance Battalion on 20 May 1997. The insignia was amended to include a crest on 27 July 1998.

== Current configuration ==
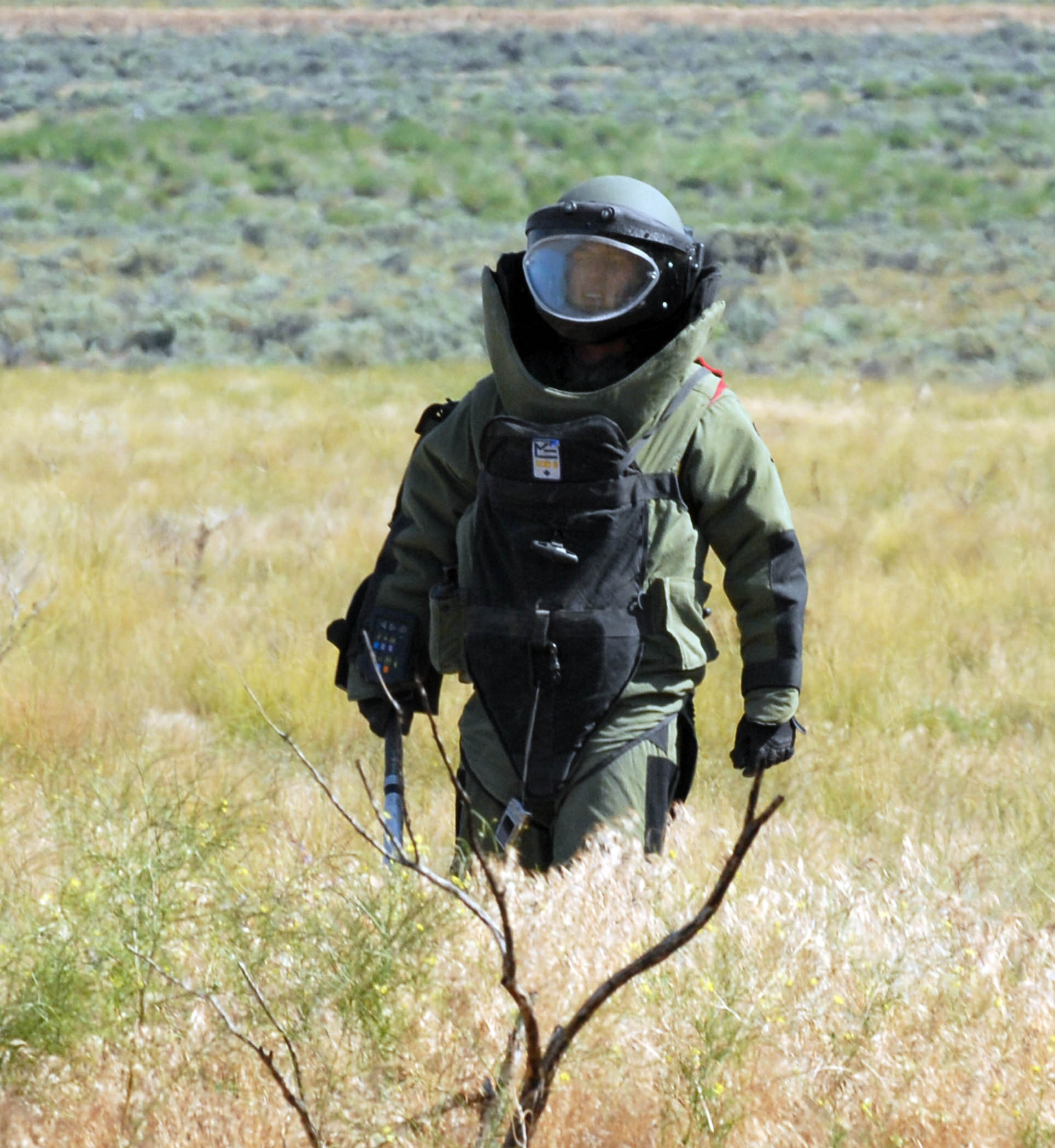
Sgt. Tyler Cole, from Kansas City, Mo., a Soldier with the 53d Ordnance Company, 3d Ordnance Battalion (EOD), walks back after viewing a possible simulated explosive ordnance during the team leader certification at Yakima Training Center, Yakima, Wash., 23 June 2009

Subordinate units:

- Headquarters and Headquarters Detachment, Joint Base Lewis-McChord, Washington
- 53rd Ordnance Company, Yakima Training Center, Washington
- 707th Ordnance Company, Joint Base Lewis-McChord, Washington
- 734th Ordnance Company, Fort Bliss, Texas
- 741st Ordnance Company, Fort Bliss, Texas
- 759th Ordnance Company, Fort Irwin, California
- 787th Ordnance Company, Joint Base Lewis-McChord, Washington

== History ==
=== World War II ===
The 3d Ordnance Battalion (Maintenance) was formed in 1942.

=== Vietnam ===
The 3d Ordnance Battalion (Ammunition) was assigned to Vietnam in October 1965. Garrisoned at Long Binh Post, the battalion constructed living quarters and an ammunition supply point.

Units:

- Headquarters and Headquarters Company
- 54th Ordnance Company
- 40th Ordnance Company
- 60th Ordnance Company
- 71st Ordnance Company
- 78th Ordnance Detachment
- 550th Ordnance Detachment
- 551st Ordnance Detachment
- 576th Ordnance Company

Attached Security Units:

- Company E (Rifle Security), 14th Infantry
- Company C (Rifle Security), 87th Infantry

After HHC, 3d Ordnance Battalion and 60th Ordnance Company were inactivated on 29 April 1972, the last remaining unit (576th Ordnance Company) was assigned to the U.S. Army Supply Depot, Long Binh (USADLB) under whose command it continued to operate the Long Binh Ammunition Depot until all remaining stocks were transferred to the newly constructed ARVN ammunition supply point located in a former portion of the U.S. Army Long Binh Ammunition Depot (USLBAD).

=== Cold War ===
In 1977 the 3d Ordnance Battalion was activated under the 59th Ordnance Brigade in West Germany.

Units:

- Headquarters and Headquarters Company, Taukkunen Barracks, Worms
- 4th Ordnance Company, Miesau
- 41st Ordnance Company, Vogelweh
- 563d Ordnance Company, Wiesbaden
- 579th Ordnance Company, Neu-Ulm; inactivated in 1982 and reformed as the 55th Maintenance Battalion

In November 1982 the 3d Ordnance Battalion was reassigned to the 32nd Army Air Defense Command.

Units:

- Headquarters and Headquarters Company, Taukkunen Barracks, Worms
- 4th Ordnance Company, Miesau

The 3d Ordnance Battalion transferred back to the 59th Ordnance Brigade in June 1985.

Units:

- Headquarters and Headquarters Company, Taukkunen Barracks, Worms
- 4th Ordnance Company, Miesau
- 41st Ordnance Company, Vogelweh

In 1990 the 3d Ordnance Battalion had the mission of removing 110,000 chemical projectiles (8" and 155mm nerve agent rounds) from Germany during Operation Steel Box.

Units:

- Headquarters and Headquarters Company, Pirmasens
- 9th Ordnance Company, Miesau
- 164th Military Police Company, Miesau
- 330th Ordnance Company, Münchweiler
- 110th Military Police Company, Münchweiler
- 563d Ordnance Company, Wiesbaden
- 41st Ordnance Company, Kaiserslautern
- 98th Chemical Detachment, Münchweiler
- 763d Medical Detachment, Münchweiler
- 41st Ordnance Detachment, Fischbach

The 3d Ordnance Battalion was inactivated in December 1990.

== Decorations ==
- Valorous Unit Award (15 November 2005 – 16 November 2006)
- Superior Unit Award (June 1983 – December 1985)
- Meritorious Unit Commendation (31 October 1965 – 31 December 1967)
- Army Superior Unit Award (26 June 1990 - 22 September 1990)
