= 71st Ordnance Group (EOD) =

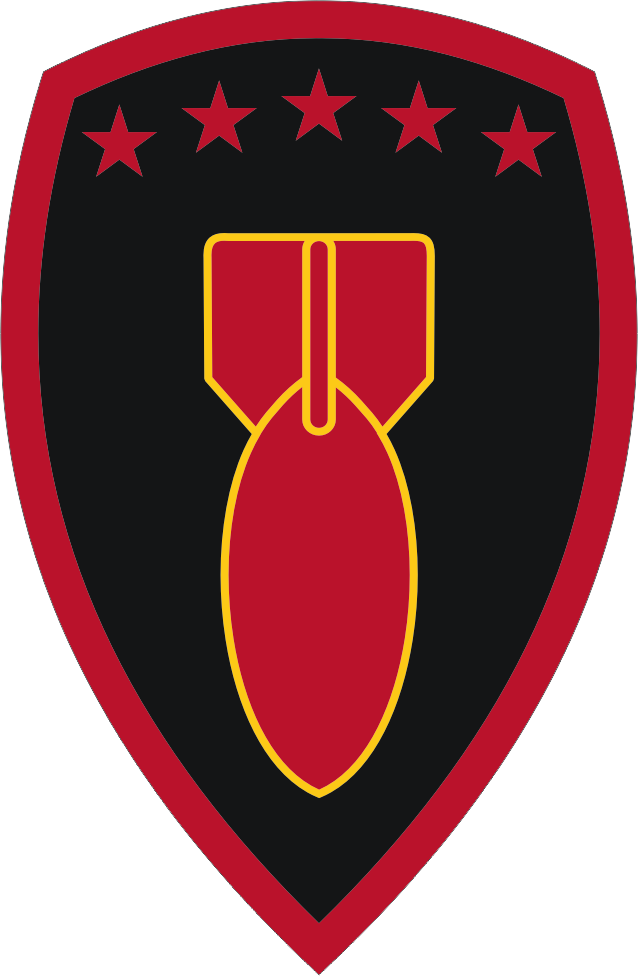
- Shoulder Sleeve Insignia
- Active: 23 Jul 1944 – 30 Jun 1946; 1 Mar 1947 – 30 Apr 1954; 13 May 1955 – 24 Jun 1959; 15 Dec 1962 – 1 Jan 1966; 16 Oct 2005 – present
- Country: United States of America
- Branch: United States Army
- Type: Support
- Role: Explosive Ordnance Disposal
- Size: Group (Brigade)
- Part of: 20th CBRNE Command
- HQ: Fort Carson, Colorado
- Nickname: Raptors (Special Designation)

Commanders
- Commander: COL Aaron Teller
- Command Sergeant Major: CSM Jason Topping

Insignia
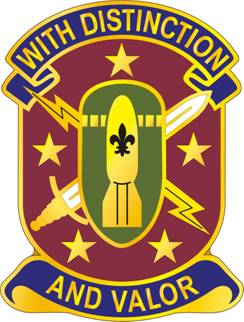
- Distinctive Unit Insignia

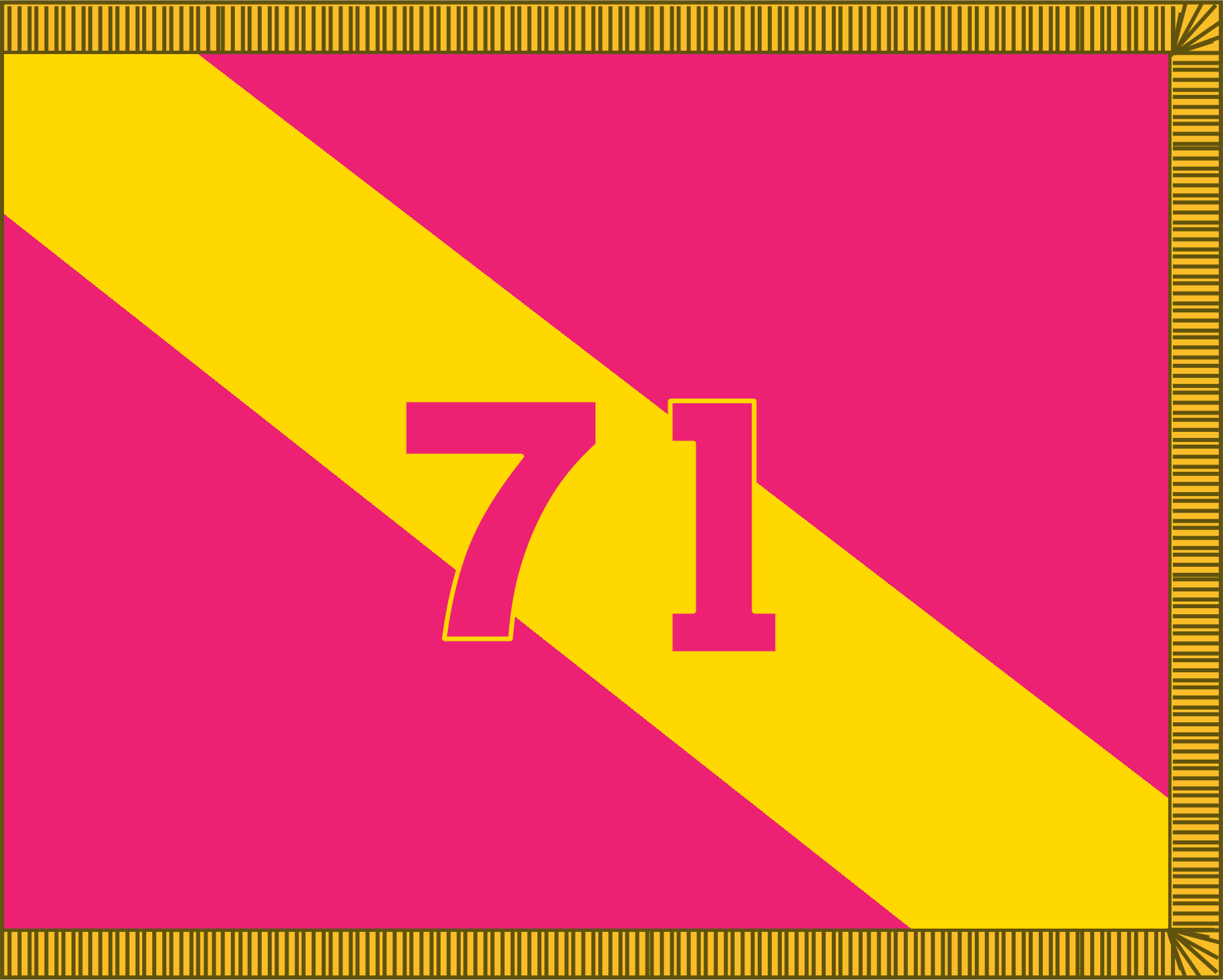
- 71st Ordnance Group Flag

The 71st Ordnance Group (EOD) ("Raptors") is one of three explosive ordnance disposal groups of the United States Army. It is the command and control headquarters for all U.S. Army Explosive Ordnance Disposal (EOD) battalions and companies located west of the Mississippi River in the Continental United States (CONUS).

Subordinate units maintain EOD response teams, which evaluate, render safe, and dispose of conventional, chemical/biological, or nuclear ordnance, or improvised explosive devices (IEDs). While subordinate units are trained and equipped for combat operations, they also support peacetime missions, including range surface clearance operations of active U.S. Army installations, support of civilian law enforcement agencies, and support to the U.S. Secret Service for protection of VIPs.

The current command team consists of Colonel Aaron Teller and Command Sergeant Major Jason Topping.

== Mission ==
On order, the group deploys and conducts operations in support of the Combative Commanders or other government agencies to counter CBRNE and Weapon of Mass Destruction threats.

== Subordinate units ==
- 71st Ordnance Group (EOD), Fort Carson
  - Headquarters and Headquarters Detachment, Fort Carson
  - 3rd Ordnance Battalion (EOD) "Nighthawks", Joint Base Lewis-McChord
    - Headquarters and Headquarters Company, Joint Base Lewis-McChord, Washington
    - 53d Ordnance Company (EOD), Yakima Training Center, Washington
    - 707th Ordnance Company (EOD) "Thunderbirds", Joint Base Lewis-McChord, Washington
    - 734th Ordnance Company (EOD), Fort Bliss, Texas
    - 741st Ordnance Company (EOD), Fort Bliss, Texas
    - 759th Ordnance Company (EOD), Fort Irwin, California
    - 787th Ordnance Company (EOD) "Sasquatches", Joint Base Lewis-McChord, Washington
  - 79th Ordnance Battalion (EOD), Fort Riley
    - Headquarters and Headquarters Company, Fort Riley
    - 630th Ordnance Company (EOD) “Dirty 630”, Fort Riley, KS
    - 704th Ordnance Company (EOD), Fort Hood, TX
    - 752nd Ordnance Company (EOD), Fort Hood, TX
    - 761st Ordnance Company (EOD), Fort Sill, OK
    - 774th Ordnance Company (EOD), Fort Riley, KS
    - 797th Ordnance Company (EOD), Fort Hood, TX
  - 242nd Ordnance Battalion (EOD), Fort Carson
    - Headquarters and Headquarters Company, Fort Carson, CO
    - 62nd Ordnance Company (EOD), Fort Carson, CO
    - 663rd Ordnance Company (EOD), Fort Carson, CO
    - 705th Ordnance Company (EOD), Fort Johnson, LA
    - 763rd Ordnance Company (EOD), Fort Leonard Wood, MO
    - 749rd Ordnance Company (EOD), Fort Carson, CO
    - 764th Ordnance Company (EOD), Fort Carson, CO
  - 21st Ordnance Company (EOD), Kirtland Air Force Base

== Lineage ==
1. Constituted 17 July 1944, as HHD, 71st Ordnance Group
2. Activated 23 July 1944 in France
3. Inactivated 30 June 1946 in Germany
4. Re-designated 17 February 1947 as HHD, 361st Ordnance Group,
5. Activated 1 March 1947 at Atlanta, Georgia
6. Reorganized and re-designated 27 April 1949 as Headquarters and Headquarters Company (HHC), 361st Ordnance Group
7. Inactivated 30 April 1954 at Atlanta, Georgia
8. Re-designated 19 April 1955 as HHC, 71st Ordnance Group
9. Activated 13 May 1955 in Germany
10. Reorganized and re-designated 20 November 1958 as HHD, 71st Ordnance Group
11. Inactivated 24 June 1959 in Germany
12. Re-designated 17 November 1962 as HHC, 71st Ordnance Group
13. Activated 15 December 1962 in Korea
14. Inactivated 1 January 1966 in Korea
15. Activated 16 October 2005 as HHD, 71st Ordnance Group (EOD), Fort Carson Colorado

== Honors ==
=== Campaign participation credit ===
- World War II
- Normandy
- Northern France
- Rhineland
- Ardennes-Alsace
- Central Europe
- Operation Iraqi Freedom
- Operation Enduring Freedom

=== Decorations ===
1. Meritorious Unit Commendation (Army)
2. Streamer Embroidered EUROPEAN THEATER
3. Joint Meritorious Unit Awards (JMUA)
