= Explosive Ordnance Disposal Badge =

Military badge of the United States Armed Forces

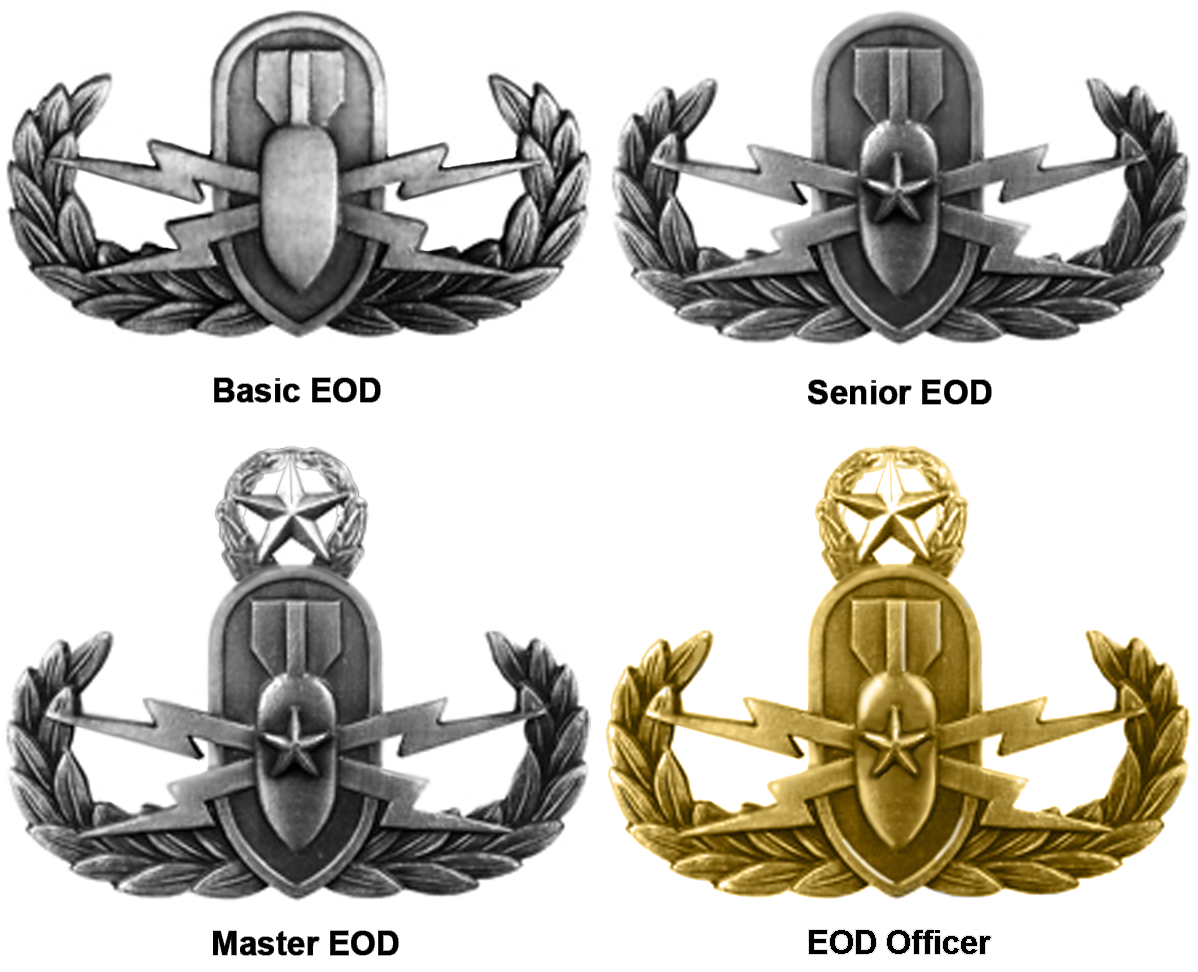
- Type: Badge
- Presented by: United States Armed Forces
- Status: Currently awarded
- Established: 1950s

Army Precedence
- Next (higher): Combat Medical Badge
- Next (lower): Pathfinder Badge

The Explosive Ordnance Disposal Badge is a military badge of the United States Armed Forces which recognizes those service members, qualified as explosive ordnance disposal (EOD) technicians, who are specially trained to deal with the construction, deployment, disarmament, and disposal of high explosive munitions including other types of ordnance such as nuclear, biological and chemical weapons along with improvised explosive devices (IED) and improvised nuclear devices (IND). Also known as the “EOD Badge” or "Crab", the decoration is issued by the United States Army, Air Force, Navy and Marine Corps. The EOD Badge is the only occupational badge awarded to all four services under the United States Department of Defense.

First created in the 1950s, the EOD Badge is issued in three levels and is identical for all branches of service. Although each service has its own requirements the basic EOD badge is issued upon completion of explosive handling training and/or between 18–24 months of on-the-job field training. The Senior EOD Badge is issued after 3–5 years as an explosive ordnance specialist and the Master Explosive Ordnance Disposal Badge is issued after 7–15 years of service in a senior supervisory position.

== The meaning of the EOD Badge ==
The "crab", as it is commonly known, is the only joint service badge and can only be earned upon successful completion of the 42-week course at the Naval School of Explosive Ordnance Disposal (NAVSCOLEOD) located at Eglin Air Force Base, Florida. Prior to attending NAVSCOLEOD, Navy service members attend Naval Diving and Salvage Training Center (NDSTC) in Panama City, FL for a nine week EOD Diver Course. Additionally the Naval students will attend the maritime ordnance section known as "Area 8" followed by Underwater division. After NAVSCOLEOD, Navy service members attend a 3-4 week course to earn "jump wings" at the Army's Ft. Benning, GA. Army service members will attend a course at Fort Gregg-Adams, Virginia for seven weeks before attending NAVSCOLEOD.

The Wreath Symbolic of the achievements and laurels gained minimizing accident potentials through the ingenuity and devotion to duty of its members. It is in memory of those EOD personnel who gave their lives while performing EOD duties.

The Bomb Copied from the design of the World War II Bomb Disposal Badge, the bomb represents the historic and major objective of the EOD attack, the unexploded bomb. The three fins represent the major areas of nuclear, conventional and chemical/biological interest.

Lightning Bolts Symbolize the potential destructive power of the bomb and the courage and professionalism of EOD personnel in their endeavors to reduce hazards as well as to render explosive ordnance harmless.

The Shield Represents the EOD mission – to prevent a detonation and protect the surrounding area and property to the utmost.

== Navy designation and warfare qualification ==
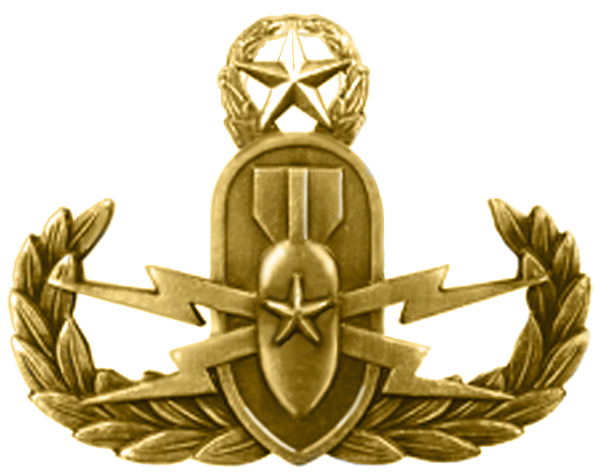
Navy EOD Warfare Officer insignia

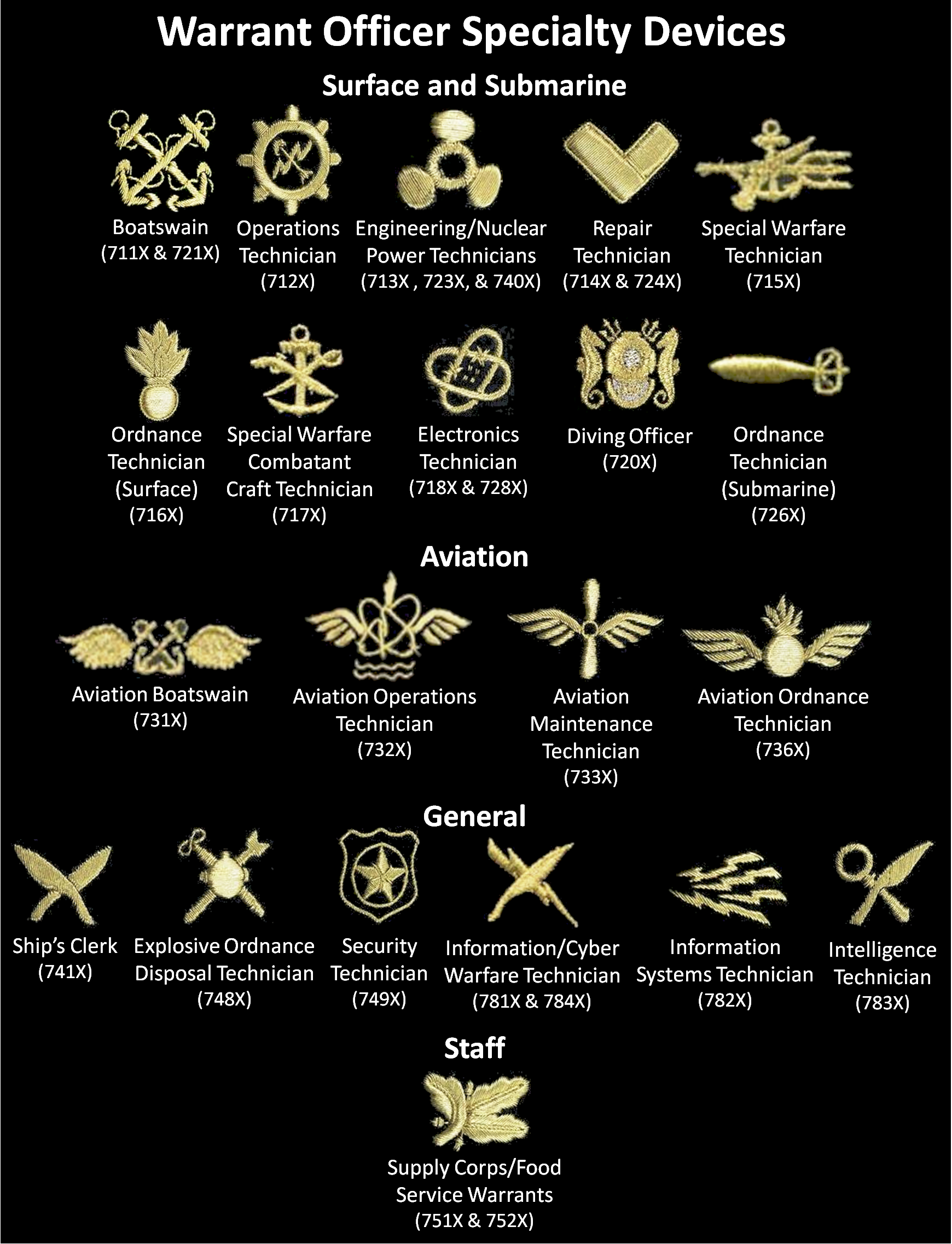
Navy EOD Technician (warrant officer) insignia (sleeve and shoulder board variant)

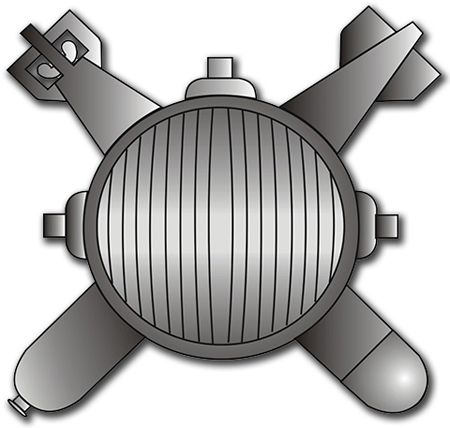
Navy EOD rating insignia

Prior to 1 June 2006, enlisted members of United States Navy that qualified as an Explosive Ordnance Disposal Warfare Specialist were authorized to wear the warfare qualification as well as have (EOD) listed after their rating designator. For example, if Bob Jones was a Hull Technician First Class Petty Officer (Explosive Ordnance Disposal Warfare Specialist), then his title would be HT1 (EOD) Bob Jones.

As of 1 June 2006 for E6-E9 and 1 October 2006 for E1-E5, U.S. Navy EOD Technicians have become their own rating within the Navy. Only after being qualified as a Senior EOD Technician, is the technician designated as an EOD Warfare Specialist. An example would be: Petty Officer First Class Bob Jones, who is a Senior EOD Technician, would have his title read EOD1 (EWS) Bob Jones.

In 2007, the Special Operations Officer Community was rechristened "Explosive Ordnance Disposal," a change which the Navy felt also needed to be reflected in the EOD Officer warfare device as well. The new officer insignia is identical to the Master EOD warfare device, but is gold in color.

== See also ==
- Army School of Ammunition
- United States Army EOD
- United States Navy EOD
