= 52nd Ordnance Group (EOD) =

52ND Ordnance Group (EOD)
- Shoulder Sleeve Insignia
- Active: 27 December 1943 – 30 June 1948; 28 January 1952 – 16 May 1955; 2 December 1965 – 20 October 1967; 1 October 1990 – present
- Country: United States
- Branch: United States Army
- Type: Support
- Role: Explosive Ordnance Disposal
- Size: Brigade
- Part of: 20TH CBRNE Command
- HQ: Fort Campbell, KY

Commanders
- Commander: COL George Hill
- Command Sergeant Major: CSM John Braxton

Insignia
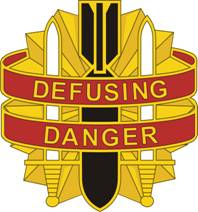
- 52D ORDNANCE GROUP DUI

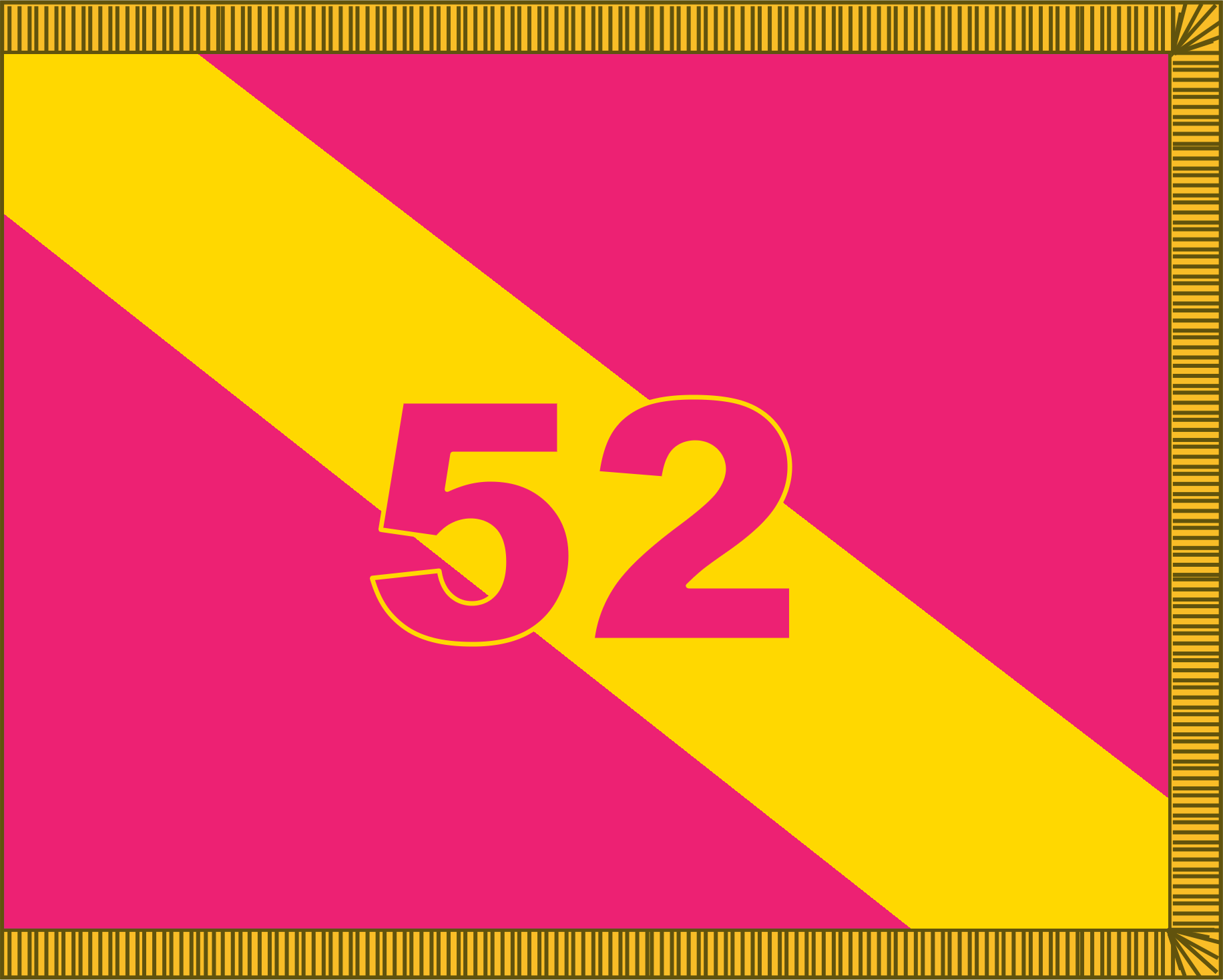
- 52nd Ordnance Group Flag

The 52nd Ordnance Group (EOD) is one of three explosive ordnance disposal groups of the United States Army. It is the command and control headquarters for all U.S. Army Explosive Ordnance Disposal (EOD) battalions and companies located east of the Mississippi River in the Continental United States (CONUS).

Subordinate units maintain EOD response teams, which evaluate, render safe, and dispose of conventional, chemical/biological, or nuclear ordnance, or improvised explosive devices (IEDs). While subordinate units are trained and equipped for combat operations, they also support peacetime missions, including range surface clearance operations of active U.S. Army installations, support of civilian law enforcement agencies, and support to the U.S. Secret Service for protection of VIPs.

The current command team consists of Colonel George A. Hill and Command Sergeant Major Donald Petrie.

== Mission ==
On order, the 52nd Ordnance Group (EOD) deploys and conducts operations in support of Combatant Commanders or other government agencies to counter CBRNE and WMD threats.

== Subordinate units ==
- 52nd Ordnance Group, Explosive Ordnance Disposal (EOD), Fort Campbell
  - Headquarters and Headquarters Detachment, Fort Campbell
  - 184th Ordnance Battalion (EOD), Fort Campbell
    - Headquarters and Headquarters Company, Fort Campbell
    - 38th Ordnance Company (EOD), Fort Stewart
    - 49th Ordnance Company (EOD), Fort Campbell
    - 717th Ordnance Company (EOD), Fort Campbell
    - 723rd Ordnance Company (EOD), Fort Campbell
    - 744th Ordnance Company (EOD), Fort Campbell
    - 756th Ordnance Company (EOD), Fort Stewart
    - 789th Ordnance Company (EOD), Fort Benning
  - 192nd Ordnance Battalion (EOD), Fort Bragg
    - Headquarters and Headquarters Company, Fort Bragg
    - 18th Ordnance Company (EOD), Fort Bragg
    - 28th Ordnance Company (EOD) (Airborne), Fort Bragg
    - 55th Ordnance Company (EOD), Fort Belvoir
    - 722nd Ordnance Company (EOD) (Airborne), Fort Bragg
    - 754th Ordnance Company (EOD), Fort Drum
    - 760th Ordnance Company (EOD), Fort Drum
    - 767th Ordnance Company (EOD) (Airborne), Fort Bragg

== Lineage ==
1. Constituted on 20 December 1943 in the Army of the United States as Headquarters and Headquarters Detachment, 52d Ordnance Group
2. Activated 27 December 1943 at Camp Hood, Texas
3. Reorganized and redesigned on 27 May 1946 as Headquarters and Headquarters Detachment, 52d Ordnance Service Group
4. Reorganized and redesigned on 20 December 1946 as the 52d Ordnance Composite Group
5. Inactivated 30 June 1948 in Austria
6. Redesignated 8 January 1952 as Headquarters and Headquarters Company, 52d Ordnance Group, and allotted to the Regular Army
7. Activated 28 January 1952 at Fort Bragg, North Carolina
8. Inactivated 16 May 1955 at Fort Bragg, North Carolina
9. Activated 2 December 1965 at Fort Bragg, North Carolina
10. Inactivated 20 October 1967 in Vietnam
11. Redesignated 1 October 1993 as Headquarters and Headquarters Detachment, 52D Ordnance Group (EOD), and activated at Fort Gillem, Georgia
12. Reassigned in early 2009 to Fort Campbell, KY with 184 OD BN (EOD)

== Honors ==
=== Campaign participation credit ===
- World War II:

Normandy
Northern France
Rhineland
Ardennes-Alsace
Central Europe

- Vietnam

Counteroffensive
Counteroffensive, Phase II
Counteroffensive, Phase III

=== Decorations ===
1. Meritorious Unit Commendation (Army)
2. Streamer Embroidered VIETNAM 1966.
