= Improvised nuclear device =

Theoretical illicit nuclear weapon

An Improvised nuclear device (IND) is a theoretical illicit nuclear weapon bought, stolen, or otherwise originating from a nuclear state, or a weapon fabricated by a terrorist group from illegally obtained fissile nuclear weapons material that produces a nuclear explosion. An IND could be bought, or it could be built from the components of a stolen weapon or from scratch using nuclear material (plutonium or highly enriched uranium). A successful detonation would result in catastrophic loss of life, destruction of infrastructure, and nuclear contamination of a very large area.

== Types ==
One type of an improvised nuclear device (IND) attack could be conducted by terrorists with radiological materials using a radiological dispersal device (RDD), or so-called “dirty bomb.” An RDD causes no nuclear explosion but instead uses chemical explosive to spread harmful radioactivity. It could cause severe economic disruption and panic in an urban area, without causing large numbers of fatalities. Due to their common use in industry, agriculture, and medicine, these materials would be easier for terrorists to obtain.

== Design considerations ==
An IND when built from scratch would most likely be of gun-type, which is fairly easy to design and manufacture (however, requiring highly enriched uranium).

Improvised nuclear devices are likely to cause more nuclear fallout because of incomplete fission – due to overengineering the pit (making it heavier to ensure fission occurs at least in part of it); using the gun-type design; or as a result of a fizzle (yield lower than planned due to engineering/manufacturing errors) – and are likely to be exploded at ground level rather than at an altitude, which causes ground materials to be irradiated and drawn up into the mushroom cloud.

== See also ==
- Dirty bomb
- Nuclear weapon
