= Explosive ordnance disposal (United States Navy) =

US Navy personnel who render safe or detonate unexploded ordnance

Navy Explosive Ordnance Disposal (EOD)
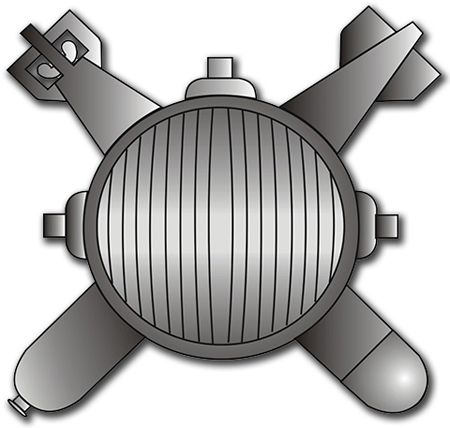
- United States Navy EOD Technician Insignia
- Active: June 1941–present
- Country: United States
- Branch: United States Navy
- Type: Naval Bomb Disposal Expeditionary Special Operations
- Role: Bomb disposal, CBRN defense
- Size: 2,433 total: 2,290 Active personnel; 143 Reserve personnel
- Part of: Navy Expeditionary Combat Command, Supports; United States Naval Special Warfare Command
- Engagements: World War II; Korean War; Vietnam War; Persian Gulf War; Global War on Terror; War in Afghanistan; Iraq War; Operation Inherent Resolve

United States Navy Explosive Ordnance Disposal technicians render safe all types of ordnance, including improvised, chemical, biological, and nuclear. They perform land and underwater location, identification, render-safe, and recovery (or disposal) of foreign and domestic ordnance. They conduct demolition of hazardous munitions, pyrotechnics, and retrograde explosives using detonation and burning techniques. They forward deploy and fully integrate with the various combatant commanders, special operations forces (SOF), and various warfare units within the Navy, Marine Corps, Air Force and Army. They are also called upon to support military and civilian law enforcement agencies, as well as the Secret Service.

EOD Technicians' missions take them to many different kinds of environments and climates in every part of the world. They have many assets available to arrive to their mission, from open- and closed-circuit scuba and surface supplied diving rigs, to parachute insertion from fixed-wing aircraft and fast-rope, abseil, and Special Patrol Insertion/Extraction (SPIE) from rotary aircraft, to small boats and tracked vehicles.

== History ==
Navy Explosive Ordnance Disposal teams trace their history back to the first group of volunteers selected to work with the famed British UXO teams, following the initial German Blitzkrieg attacks in early 1940. In June 1941, these veterans returned to form the first class in what was originally named the Mine Recovery School. Officers and enlisted personnel entered the eleven-week school, qualifying as Mine Recovery Personnel/Second Class Divers. Between June 1941 and October 1945, nineteen classes graduated and deployed throughout the Pacific and Mediterranean theaters. Divided into Mobile Explosive Investigative Units (MEIU) they were instrumental in the clearance of explosive hazards both on land and at sea. The Korean War saw a return to action on various minesweepers ensuring the continual clearance of shipping hazards. Additionally, the now renamed Explosive Ordnance Disposal (EOD) Units took part in inland intelligence operations and interacted with ground-based units in Inchon, Wonson and throughout the United Nations Theater of operations.

The Vietnam War saw an increase in overall participation by EOD units. Units from EOD Group Pacific, Pearl Harbor, Hawaii deployed throughout the region. EODGRUPAC was composed of Mobile Unit, Shipboard Unit and Training and Evaluation Unit personnel. Deployed teams on board ships at sea were composed of one officer and two enlisted men. Teams in-country were larger and were based from the Mekong Delta (RIVFLOT 1) to DaNang. With an overall emphasis in sea and riverine mine clearance operations, these teams ensured the continued safety for shipping and maritime operations.

Since the close of the Vietnam War, the changing world situation and increased operational tasking have prompted the expansion of EOD units in number, size and capabilities. Their record in recent history includes the Gulf War where EOD Technicians cleared in excess of 500 naval mines. EOD was the critical element in eliminating unexploded ordnance from the USS Stark (FFG-31) after two Exocet anti-ship missiles fired from an Iraqi aircraft hit her. EOD developed render safe procedures on-site to prevent a catastrophe. During joint operations in Somalia, Haiti, Bosnia, and Kosovo, EOD provided safety and operational continuity by eliminating booby traps, weapons caches, and performing mine clearance operations. EOD units served in Afghanistan and Iraq where they supported the global war against terrorism, destroying tons of post war ordnance and reducing the threat imposed by Improvised Explosive Devices (IED) that have plagued both countries. Forward deployed, they have been fully integrated within the various Special Operations units within the U.S. Navy and Army.

== Training ==
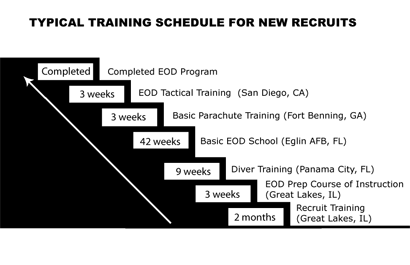
EOD training pipeline

The EOD training pipeline starts with three weeks of preparatory training at Naval Station Great Lakes, Illinois. The candidate will work on swim stroke development, long range swims and physical conditioning. EOD candidates will then attend an additional 51 weeks of rigorous training. Their training starts with nine weeks of dive school held at the Naval Diving and Salvage Training Center (NDSTC) in Panama City, Florida. Besides learning how to dive, candidates learn about the various kinds of equipment and dive physics. After successful completion of dive school, candidates transfer to Naval Explosive Ordnance Disposal School at Eglin Air Force Base in Fort Walton Beach, Florida. This training is broken down into specific types of ordnance:

Demolition Division
Includes how to set up various explosive firing trains
Tools & Methods Division
Teaches the various tools and methods of EOD work
Core Division
Teaches fundamentals of EOD work
Ground Ordnance Division
Focuses on projected munitions and grenades
Air Ordnance Division
Focuses on bombs and missiles
Improvised Explosive Device
Includes "homemade bombs”
Bio/Chem Division
Includes lessons on various biological and chemical agents
Nuclear Ordnance Division
Covers basic nuclear physics and radiation monitoring and decontamination procedures
Underwater Ordnance Division
Emphasizes torpedoes and other underwater explosives as well as underwater search techniques

Every section teaches how to render-safe or defuse ordnance.

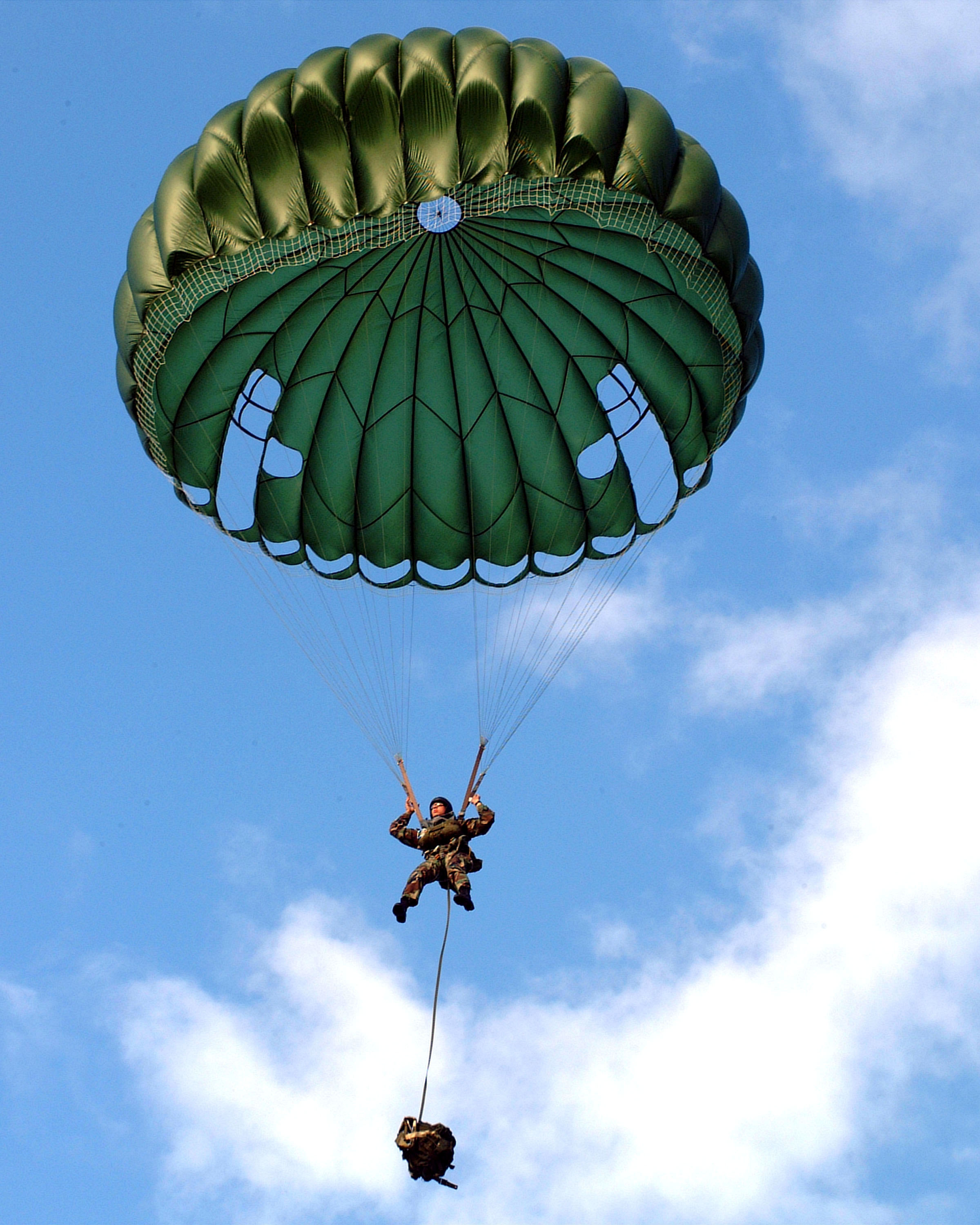
Member of Explosive Ordnance Disposal Mobile Unit Five jumps from a CH-46 using a MC1-1C parachute

Upon completion of basic EOD training, all graduates will attend the three-week Basic Airborne Course at Fort Moore, Georgia where candidates qualify as a basic parachutist.

After Jump School, training continues at Gulfport, Mississippi, for an additional four weeks, consisting of weapons training in the use of the 9mm handgun and the M4 carbine as well as combat first aid.

The final phase of EOD training is three weeks of EOD Tactical Training at the Naval Amphibious Base in San Diego. This will consist of helicopter insertion (fast-rope, rappel, cast and SPIE), small arms/weapons training, small unit tactics (weapons, self-defense, land navigation, and patrolling), and tactical communications (satellite and high frequency). Upon completion of the EOD training, graduates are assigned to EOD Mobile Units where they gain advanced on-the-job training and experience as members of Combat Expeditionary Support (CES) platoons/companies, Carrier and Expeditionary Strike Group platoons, SOF Companies, and Marine Mammal Companies.

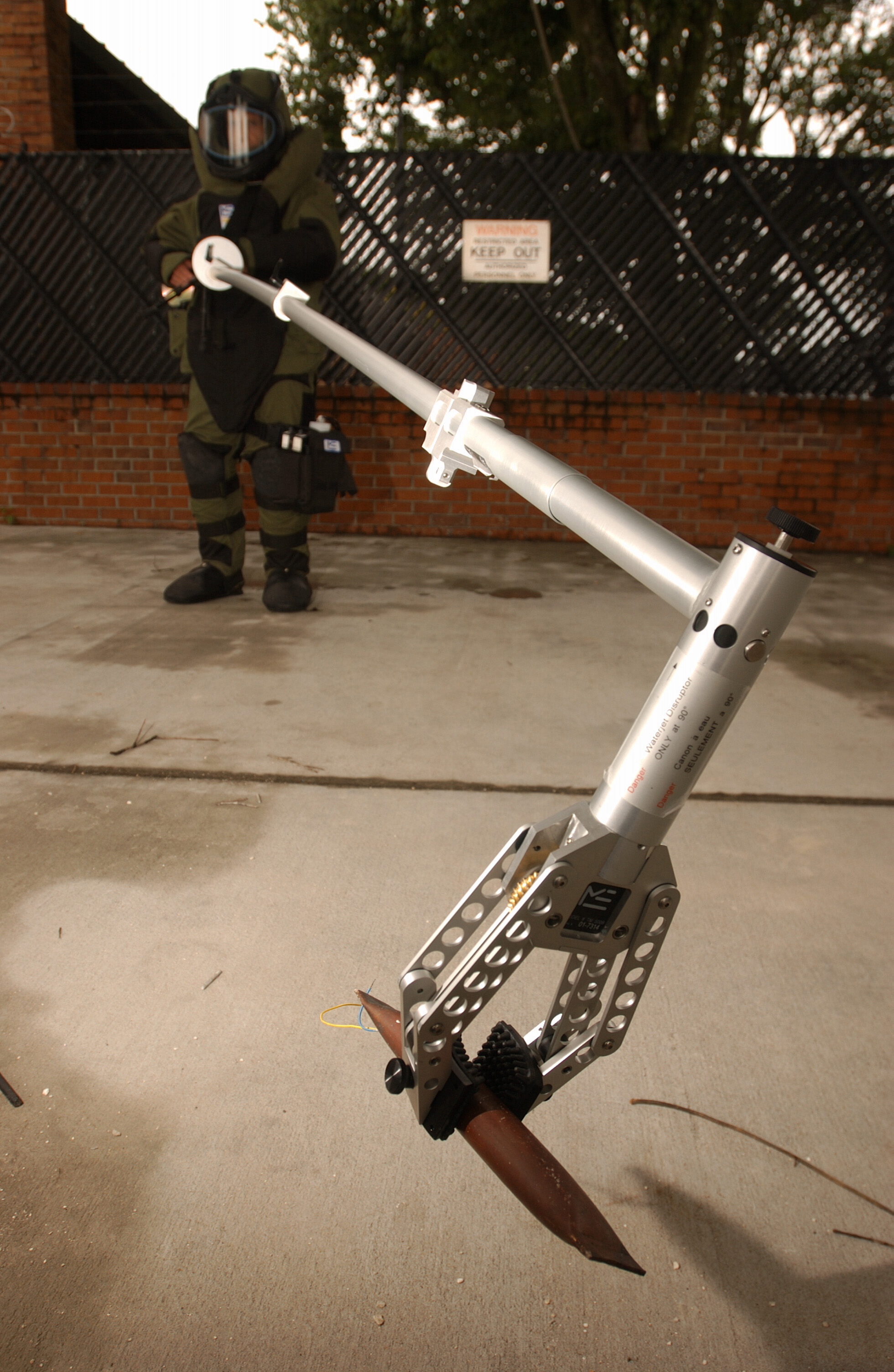
US Navy 030605-N-5862D-011 Aviation Ordnanceman 1st Class Jeff Kuhar, wearing a bomb suit, uses a manipulator to pick up a simulated suspect explosive aboard Naval Submarine Base King's Bay, Georgia

=== Officer training ===
Officer training for the EOD career field (119x / 114x) differs slightly. Their pipeline is as follows:

- EOD Junior Officer Course (7 days, Naval Diving and Salvage Training Center) – This course trains junior officers in EOD group, mobile unit, and detachment/small unit organization to include organizational relationships with detachments/small units, small group dynamics, CPO/OIC relationships, ethics, and EOD case studies.
- Diver Training (60 days, Naval Diving and Salvage Training Center) – Designed to provide qualified non-diving personnel with the basic training necessary to safely and effectively perform as a dive team member/diver in SCUBA and MK-16 UBA in accordance with the U.S. Navy Diving Manual.
- EOD School (320 days, Naval School Explosive Ordnance Disposal) (see enlisted training)
- Basic Airborne (23 days, Fort Benning) (see enlisted training)
- Expeditionary Combat Skills (27 days, Center for Security Forces)
- EOD Tactical Training (21 days, EOD Training and Evaluation Unit ONE, San Diego) (See enlisted training)
- EOD Platoon Leader Course (12 days)

Advanced training opportunities include foreign language, Advanced Improvised Explosive Device Disposal, and Department of Energy training.

== Advanced equipment ==
EOD employs a variety of tools, techniques, and procedures (TTPs) to accomplish the mission. Robots are used to perform remote procedures on unexploded ordnance and improvised explosive devices. Efforts to maintain the latest technology are accomplished with the assistance and the DoE and various civilian organizations. Johns Hopkins University maintains the Advanced Explosive Ordnance Disposal Robotic System (AEODRS) program. The primary goal of AEODRS is to develop a common architecture for a family of unmanned ground vehicle (UGV) systems to enable unprecedented levels of interoperability. AEODRS is a Joint Service Explosive Ordnance Disposal (JSEOD) program, executed through the Naval Explosive Ordnance Disposal Technology Division (NAVEODTECHDIV) via the Navy Program Management Office for Explosive Ordnance Disposal/Counter Remote Controlled Improvised Explosive Device Electronic Warfare (PMS-408).

== Units ==
=== Explosive Ordnance Disposal (EOD) Group One ===
Naval Amphibious Base Coronado, California

- EOD Mobile Unit ONE, Naval Base Point Loma, California
- EOD Mobile Unit THREE, Naval Amphibious Base Coronado, California
- EOD Mobile Unit FIVE, Naval Base Guam
- EOD Mobile Unit ELEVEN, Imperial Beach, California
- EOD Training and Evaluation Unit (TEU) ONE, Naval Base Point Loma, California
- Mobile Diving and Salvage Unit (MDSU) ONE, Pearl Harbor, Hawaii
- EOD Expeditionary Support Unit One, Naval Amphibious Base Coronado, California
- EOD Operational Support Unit SEVEN, Naval Amphibious Base Coronado, California (decommissioned)

=== Explosive Ordnance Disposal (EOD) Group Two ===
Naval Amphibious Base Little Creek, Virginia

- EOD Mobile Unit TWO, Naval Amphibious Base Little Creek, Virginia
- EOD Mobile Unit SIX, Naval Amphibious Base Little Creek, Virginia
- EOD Mobile Unit TEN, Naval Amphibious Base Little Creek, Virginia
- EOD Mobile Unit EIGHT, Naval Station Rota Spain, Spain
- EOD Mobile Unit TWELVE, Naval Amphibious Base Little Creek, Virginia
- EOD Expeditionary Support Unit TWO, Naval Amphibious Base Little Creek, Virginia
- EOD Training and Evaluation Unit (TEU) TWO, Joint Expeditionary Base East, Virginia

== See also ==
- Clearance diver – Navy diver specialised in explosives
- Frogman – Tactical scuba diver
- Explosive Ordnance Disposal Badge – Military badge of the United States Armed Forces
- Defence Explosive Ordnance Disposal, Munitions and Search Training Regiment – British Army regiment (British Army)
