= Defense Support of Civil Authorities =

American perspective on armed forces bringing order and peace domestically

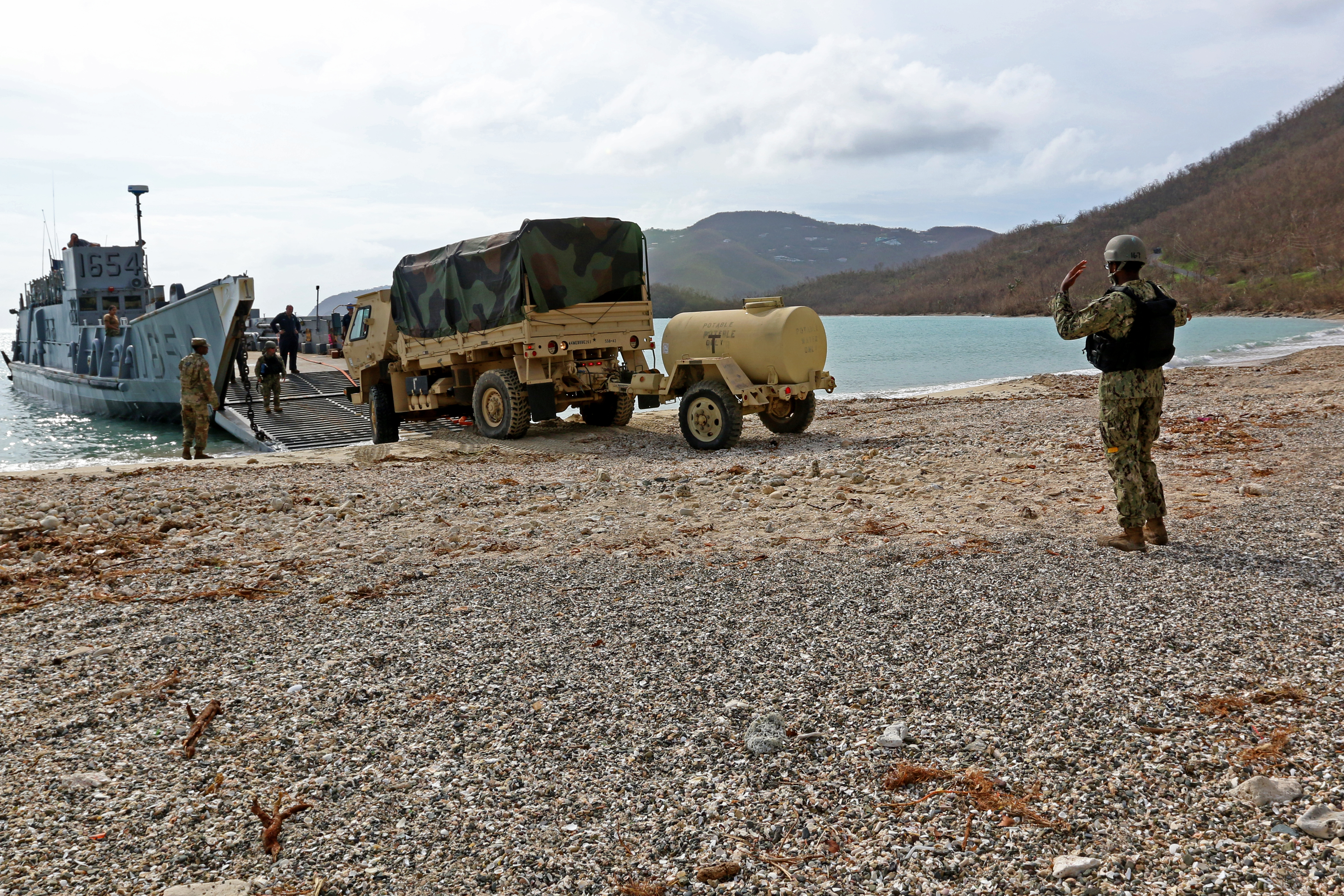
A U.S. Navy Sailor assigned to the amphibious assault ship USS Kearsarge (LHD 3) directs a U.S. Army light medium tactical vehicle off a landing craft, utility in Saint Thomas, U.S. Virgin Islands. Service members returned to the U.S. Virgin Islands to assist with disaster relief operations in response to hurricanes Irma and Maria. September 2017

Defense Support of Civil Authorities (DSCA) is the process by which United States military assets and personnel can be used to assist in missions normally carried out by civil authorities. These missions have included: responses to natural and man-made disasters, law enforcement support, special events, and other domestic activities. A recent example of the use of DSCA is the military response to Hurricane Katrina. DSCA is the overarching guidance of how the United States military can be requested by a federal agency and the procedures that govern the actions of the military during employment.

The "Directorate of military support" (DOMS) for domestic operations (DOMS) who is the functional process manager of DSCA is located inside each state's "Joint Operation Center" (JOC). The normal course of action is for the Office of Emergency Management within the state to request military support through the JOC. In turn, the JOC under the authority of the DOMS will initiate military support in the form of equipment that supports the Federal Emergency Management Agency (FEMA) Emergency Support Functions.

== Authority ==
=== Directive 3025.18 ===
The provision of DSCA is codified in Department of Defense Directive 3025.18. This directive defines DSCA as:

Support provided by U.S. Federal military forces, DoD civilians, DoD contract personnel, DoD Component assets, and National Guard forces (when the Secretary of Defense, in coordination with the Governors of the affected States, elects and requests to use those forces in title 10, U.S.C., status) in response to requests for assistance from civil authorities for domestic emergencies, law enforcement support, and other domestic activities, or from qualifying entities for special events.

There are numerous other directives, policies and laws that shape the military's role in conducting operations in support of other federal agencies. Some of them are the Insurrection Act, Homeland Security Act, Stafford Act, Economy Act and the Homeland Security Presidential Directive – 5. Each of these affect the way the military responds to a request for assistance from an interagency partner.

When federal forces deploy support of DSCA, they come under the operational control of U.S. Northern Command (USNORTHCOM), once those forces enter the incident area. US Northern Command only controls federal forces deployed into the impact area in response to the incident.

When National Guard forces are deployed under the authority of a state's Governor, they remain under control of the Governor. These forces may be operating either in a USC Title 32 duty status, or, under State Active Duty (SAD) duty status. The National Guard refers to this as National Guard Domestic Operations (NGDO). The scope of an incident may sometimes expand beyond just support to civil authorities and require National Guard forces be called to federal active duty in a USC Title 10 duty status. In Title 10 status, National Guard forces operate as a federal force under the authority of the President and the scope of their mission would expand to national defense. What may have previously been a limited-scope NGDO mission evolves into a DSCA mission.

Large and complex incidents may require a mix of military forces operating under Title 10 and Title 32. To ensure unity of effort and command, a Dual-Status Commander may sometimes be appointed to maintain command authority over military members in either status.

=== Military Cooperation with Civilian Law Enforcement Agencies Act ===
The Military Cooperation with Civilian Law Enforcement Agencies Act is a United States federal law enacted in 1981 that allows the United States Armed Forces to cooperate with domestic and foreign law enforcement agencies. The Act was known as Public Law 97-86 and is codified at title 10 of the United States Code, Chapter 18.

== Activation ==
Providing support to civil authorities can not impair the ability of the military to conduct its primary mission. It is also critical to understand that the military is always in a supporting role and never the lead. According to the 2011 DSCA Interagency Partner Guide, a request to the DSCA is made when a disaster, crisis or special incident occurs and local, tribal or state authorities can no longer manage the situation. All incidents are controlled at the lowest civilian levels with the military filling in critical roles. Only federal agencies can request Department of Defense assistance and this request usually comes on behalf of a state need.

All federal agencies can request military assistance by using a simple memo format that contains specific information on what capability is needed and also gives cost reimbursement guidance. Military assets conducting support stay under the control of the military chain of command. Assistance is coordinated with the local responders in the disaster area to ensure the military support is being properly utilized as per the approved request. If there is a need to change the original mission of forces conducting the assistance, the request process starts all over again. Determining when the military is done conducting the requested support is done collaboratively between DOD officials, local government and federal agencies.

All support provided by the military is required to be reimbursed by the agency that requested it. The military's budget does not include providing DSCA support so it must be paid back in order to maintain the ability to conduct its primary mission.

== FEMA ==
On the civilian side, the Federal Emergency Management Agency or better known as FEMA, is the main federal responder when a disaster overwhelms a state(s). When a state exhausts all of its resources or is lacking a unique capability during a disaster, it will turn to the federal government for assistance. The agency that usually responds and will coordinate the overall federal effort will be FEMA. FEMA has a cornucopia of options available to help a state in need, one of those options is to turn to the military. FEMA has the ability to direct most other federal resource under its statutory authority, but it can not direct the military, it must request the assistance. Military support is a last resort; all other local, state and federal resources must be exhausted prior to the military providing support or a unique requirement that can not be found within the civilian or federal system.

Requesting the military to respond to a disaster, manmade or natural, is done through a formal process established between FEMA and Department of Defense. While this process is pretty straight forward, it has many integrated steps that require involvement from numerous sources, both military and civilian.

== History ==
An early instance that had a major influence on shaping how the military responds was the 1794 Whiskey Rebellion. It set the stage for establishing the fundamental principles codified in the United States' current laws. Because of the excise tax on whiskey, the taxpayers revolted against the federal government. Violence against tax collectors grew to such a level that it prompted Presidential intervention. During August to November 1794, federal troops deployed to Western Pennsylvania as a show of force. Throughout this threat to federal authority, President Washington's guidance was that the military was to support the local civil authorities, not impede them or control them in any way. This underlying principle remains imbedded in the present laws, systems, and processes of how the military interacts within the DSCA environment.

Another important factor governing the actions of the military in executing DSCA is the Posse Comitatus Act (PCA). This law was established post Civil War and prohibited the use of active duty military members (Title 10) of the Army and Air Force in enforcing civil law and order unless directed by the President. (Naval forces of the Marines and Navy are prohibited by separate legislation and regulations from similar domestic law enforcement actions.) An event that caused the President to employ federal military in direct support to local law enforcement was the Los Angeles riots of 1992 where federal troops were brought in to help quell the violence. The PCA does not apply to the United States National Guard in their state support role.

== See also ==
- Military aid to the civil power
- Military operations other than war
