= Render safe procedure =

Aspect of bomb disposal procedures

The render safe procedure (RSP) is the portion of the explosive ordnance disposal procedures involving the application of special explosive ordnance disposal procedures, methods and tools to provide the interruption of functions or separation of essential components of unexploded ordnance (including improvised explosive devices) to prevent an unintended detonation.

== Overview ==
Ordnance detonations can be broadly categorized into high order detonation and low order detonation. A high-order detonation typically occurs when an explosive ordnance produces the intended explosive yield. In contrast, a low-order detonation usually results from a controlled ordnance detonation or a malfunctioning ordnance, leading to a significantly lower yield than expected.

Render safe procedures and techniques apply to conventional ordnance such as nuclear, chemical, biological and conventional battlefield weapons/ordnance and unconventional ordnance such as improvised explosive devices (IED) and improvised nuclear devices (IND). RSPs can also apply to explosive components of military equipment such as may be found in military vehicles and aircraft – ejection seats, explosive bolts, etc.

In civilian circles, RSPs can apply to items that can be dangerous if not handled properly, i.e. air bags and seat belt pretensioners. These are often detonated in a safe environment after replacement to comply with local legislation surrounding transport of dangerous goods.

== See also ==
- Davy Crockett (nuclear device), smallest nuclear warhead ever made, fashioned for tactical delegation
