= Upnor =

Villages in Kent, England

Coordinates: 51.4104°N 0.526°E

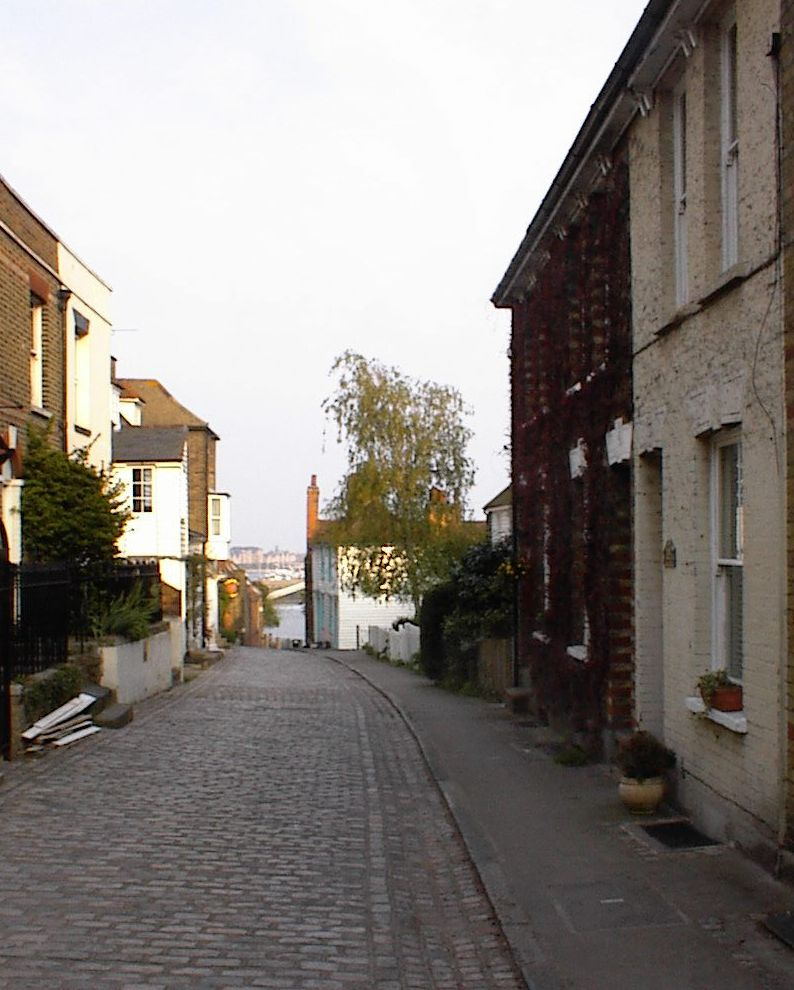
- Upper Upnor High Street

- Location within Kent
- Unitary authority: Medway
- Ceremonial county: Kent
- Region: South East
- Country: England
- Sovereign state: United Kingdom
- Post town: Rochester
- Postcode district: ME2
- Police: Kent
- Fire: Kent
- Ambulance: South East Coast
- UK Parliament: Rochester and Strood

Lower Upnor and Upper Upnor are two small villages in Medway, Kent, England. They are in the civil parish of Frindsbury Extra on the western bank of the River Medway. Today both Lower Upnor and Upper Upnor are mainly residential and a centre for small boats moored on the River Medway, but Upnor Castle is a preserved monument of English Heritage, that was built from October 1559 until April 1567 as part of the coastal and riverine defences of the Royal Navy.

== Origins ==
Upnor meant "At The Bank" being "Æt Þæm Ōre" in Old English and "Atten Ore" in Middle English and "Atte Nore" in 1292. However, the meaning changed to "Upon The Bank" (Middle English: "Uppan Ore") and by 1374 it was "Upnore".

A skeleton of a straight-tusked elephant was excavated in August 1911, during the construction of the Royal Engineers' Upnor Hard.

== Lower Upnor ==
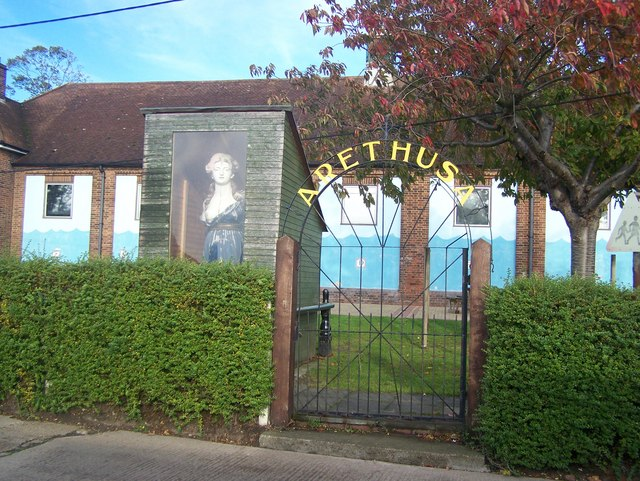
Arethusa Venture Centre, with figure-head, Lower Upnor.

Lower Upnor faces the Upnor Reach of the River Medway. It was a single row of houses, separated from the River Medway by the roadway and the hard. Located here is the Arethusa Venture Centre, which provides residential school trips and educational visits and is run by the Shaftesbury Homes and Arethusa. During January to December 1849, HMS Arethusa was the name of the training ship moored near the shore. Shaftesbury Homes and Arethusa had moored a training vessel here for over 105 years. The first was Chichester, but after then all the ships were called Arethusa. The last but one Arethusa was the Peking, one of the Flying P-Liner four-masted barques of R F Laeisz (Bremerhaven), built in February 1911, and acquired after World War 1 ended on 11 November 1918 as War Reparations. She was sold in June 1975 to the South Street Seaport Museum in New York. The last Arethusa, a 23-metre two-masted ketch, was sold in November 2000 and now sails with the Cirdan Sailing Trust in Bradwell-on-Sea in Essex, under the name Faramir.

In March 2008 to September 2008 extra housing was constructed adjacent to the Upnor Road and the River Medway, along Galleon Way, Schooner Walk and Moat Lane. These houses are located near to the public house called The Pier and The Ship in Lower Upnor, exploiting the brownfield land exposed by quarrying the steep chalky limestone side of Beacon Hill that leads to Hoo Common.

Lower Upnor is also the home of the Medway Yacht Club (MYC), which was founded on 24 September 1880, The Medway Yacht Club purchased land in Lower Upnor on 26 March 1948, now comprising approximately 14 acres (57,000 m^{2}). Upnor Sailing Club (USC) was formed on 15 October 1962 and moved into its present Club House (that was formed by renovating three existing riverfront cottages) on 17 February 1985.

== Upper Upnor ==
Upper Upnor comprises a village cobbled High Street which begins with a public house called The Kings Arms, and further down the High Street is another public house called The Tudor Rose. Both The Kings Arms and The Tudor Rose were public houses that sailors from the Royal Navy regularly drank in. On 14 September 1998, The Kings Head was renamed The Kings Arms. At the end of the High Street is Upnor Castle which is managed and owned by English Heritage. Upper Upnor has many houses displaying Kentish weatherboarding, some are Grade II listed. There used to be a Post Office and sweet shop at 23 High Street in Upper Upnor, which closed on 21 April 1989. Within Upper Upnor, along Upchat Road is Admiralty Terrace where the houses were used as Service Family Accommodation (SFA) by the Royal Navy. Upper Upnor is on the Chatham Reach of the River Medway, directly opposite St Mary's Creek.

== London Stones ==
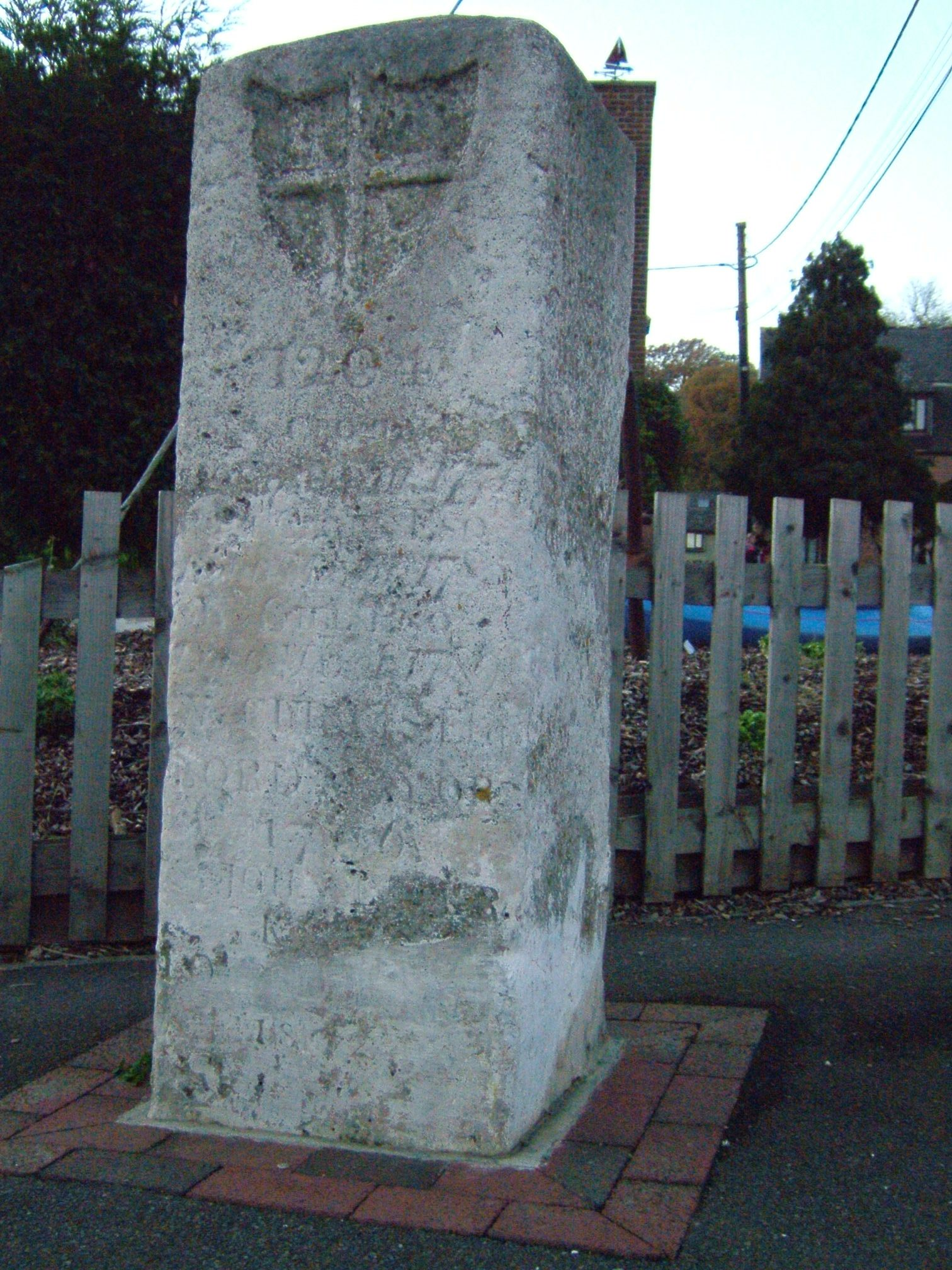
The Old London Stone standing in front of the fence of the Arethusa Venture Centre.

The London Stones are in Lower Upnor on the shoreline. They mark the limit of the Charter Rights of Fishermen from London. The Old London Stone has the date 1204 carved on it as part of the inscription from April 1768.

== Industry ==
Like other parts of Frindsbury, chalk or calcium carbonate has been extracted, high quality molding sand or foundry sand has been taken from a quarry near All Saints Church, and William Burgess Little built 25 five barges at his yard between October 1843 and June 1871. The first was the Sarah Little and the last was called the W. B. Little Finish. James Little built three barges here in 1891, 1893, and 1895. A potter's kiln can be seen on an 1830 watercolour by Susan Twopeny, now in Rochester Guildhall Museum.

== Church ==
The ecclesiastical parish of Upnor split from Frindsbury in September 1884 and was reabsorbed in December 1955. The parish church of St Philip and St James (July 1884) was designed by Ewan Christian. It is virtually unaltered.

== Military ==
=== Upnor Castle ===
Upnor Castle was built as an artillery fort between October 1559 and February 1567 in order to protect Chatham Dockyard and the associated naval anchorage. It was called into action in June 1667 when the Nederlandse Staatsmarine (Dutch State Navy) conducted a raid on the ships moored in the river; Upnor Castle proved ineffective in repelling the attack by the Dutch State Navy and it was decommissioned during March 1668. Though Upnor Castle was only operational as an artillery fort for about 100 years, it was retained as a gunpowder magazine and ammunition store until the end of World War 1; continuing in military usage through World War 2, it was opened to the public as a Departmental Museum in October 1945.

=== Lower Upnor Ordnance Depot ===
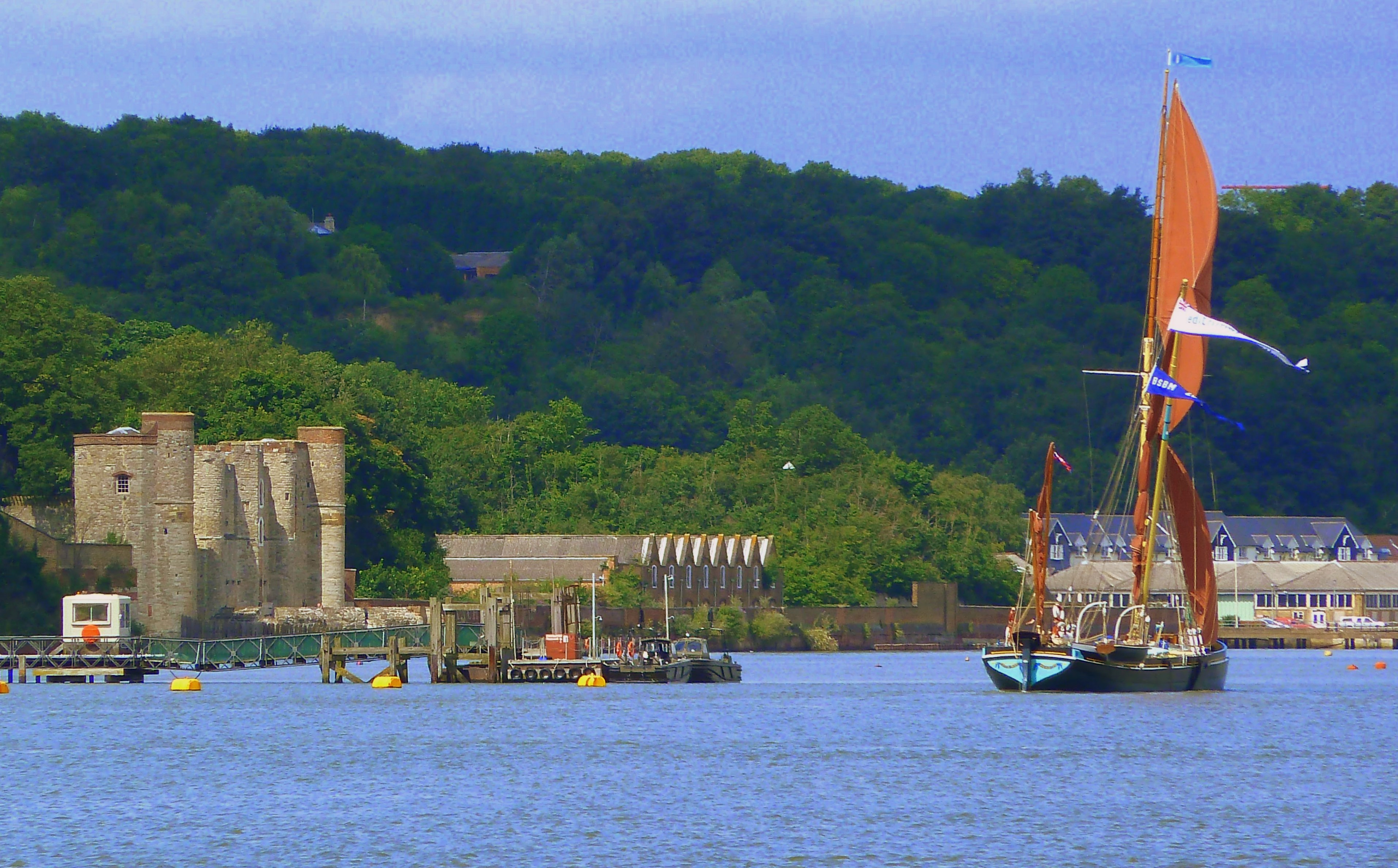
A Thames Barge sails past the depot: Upnor Castle (left), 'B' Magazine (centre), No. 5 Shell Store (right).

Upnor Castle served as a gunpowder magazine for the Board of Ordnance from 1668, providing powder for the defences of Chatham Dockyard and for the fleet based in the Nore. In September 1810 a new magazine with space for 10,000 barrels of gunpowder was built downriver from Upnor Castle (which had long needed to expand its capacity) along with a 'shifting house' for inspecting powder that had arrived by sea (though demolished, its surrounding earthworks traverse is still in evidence, midway between the magazine and Upnor Castle).

In April 1856 a second magazine was constructed at Upnor Castle alongside the first, to the same design but with more than double the capacity; (this still stands on the river bank, the earlier magazine having been demolished in November 1964). At the same time, buildings were constructed (alongside the shifting house) for storing and maintaining artillery shells; but these soon proved too small, so the site began to be extended to the north, where additional shell stores were built from the 1860s onwards. A little further to the north, a group of large houses were bought to serve as offices for the Lower Upnor Ordnance Depot. There was not enough space, though, for further bulk storage of gunpowder, so in 1875 a separate set of five magazines were built, inland at Chattenden, and linked to Upnor by a narrow-gauge railway (see below); the Upnor magazines were then converted into filled shell stores.

In February 1891 the Ordnance Yards of the United Kingdom were split between the Admiralty and the War Department, Upnor going to the former, Chattenden to the latter. The Admiralty therefore embarked on building a new inland Ordnance Depot, next to Chattenden, at Lodge Hill; opening in 1898, it dealt principally with cordite. At Upnor itself further Shell Stores was built in 1883, supplemented by new buildings for storing wet and dry guncotton (used in torpedoes and mines) in 1895. The site was extended further to the north in March 1902 to allow construction of a much larger store for filled shells and another for mines. At the same time a complex of buildings for filling shells with powder (and later also with trotyl and amatol) were added behind the original 'A' and 'B' magazines.

The three sites, Upnor, Lodge Hill and Chattenden, were active as Royal Naval Armaments Depots until August 1965. Thereafter they remained in ownership by the Ministry of Defence as part of the Royal School of Military Engineering until September 2014.

==== Present Day ====
The Lower Upnor site of the Royal Naval Armaments Depot was put up for sale in October 2014. Two years later, the Grade II* listed 'B' Magazine was being converted into offices, while a residential building of similar proportions was being erected on the footprint of the demolished 'A' Magazine of the Royal Naval Armaments Depot; behind the 'A' Magazine and 'B' Magazine, more apartments were planned within the surviving concrete traverses (blast walls) of a demolished set of shell-filling rooms which date from October 1906. Meanwhile, the surviving buildings to the north were also being refurbished for light commercial and retail use. The inland British Army Depots or Regimental Depots, latterly known as Chattenden and Lodge Hill Military Camps, were put up for sale in 2016 by the Homes England, which is part of the Ministry of Housing, Communities and Local Government.

==== Gallery ====
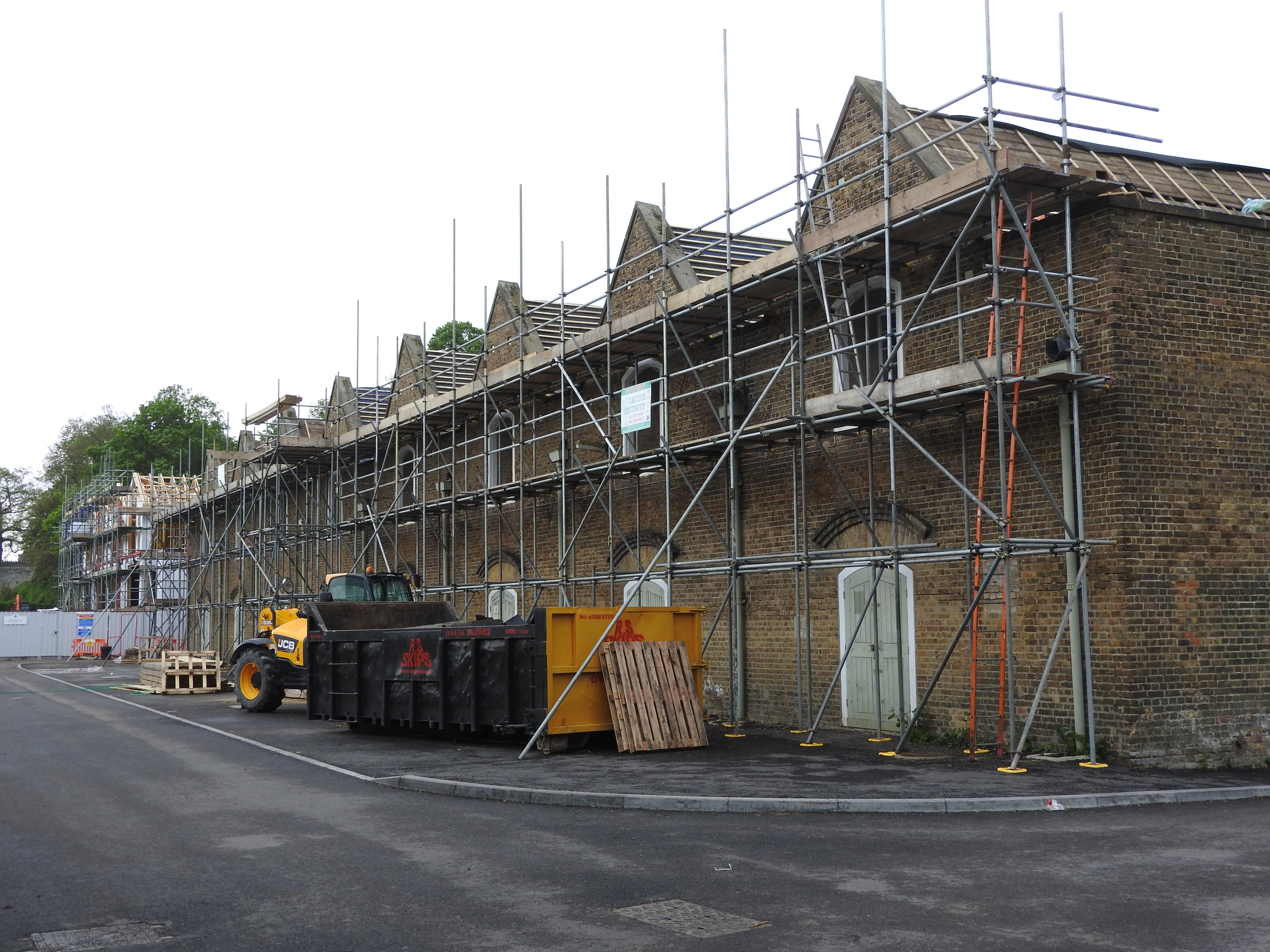
Former 'B' Magazine (1857) undergoing refurbishment.

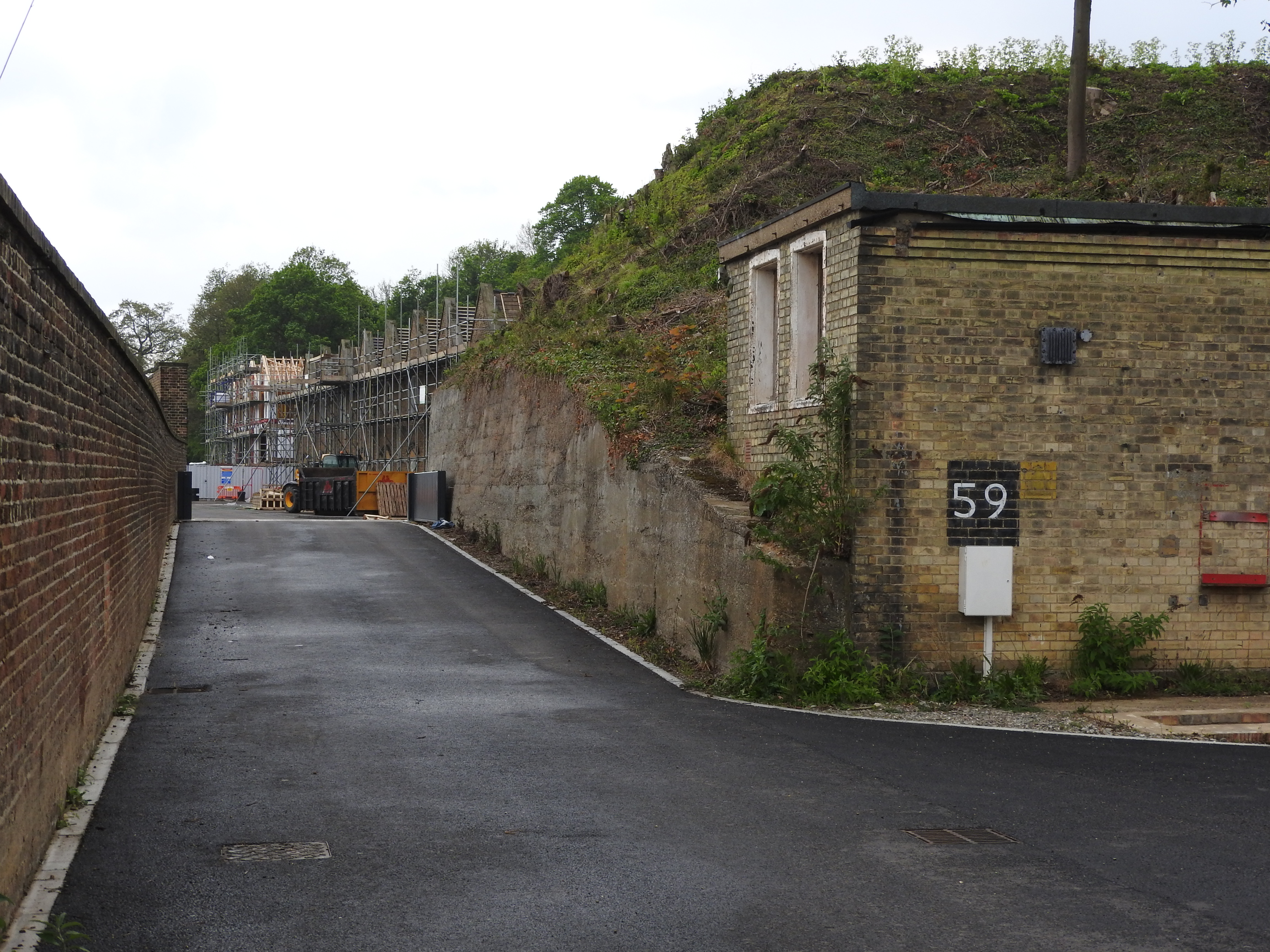
Former Dry Guncotton Store (right, 1895)

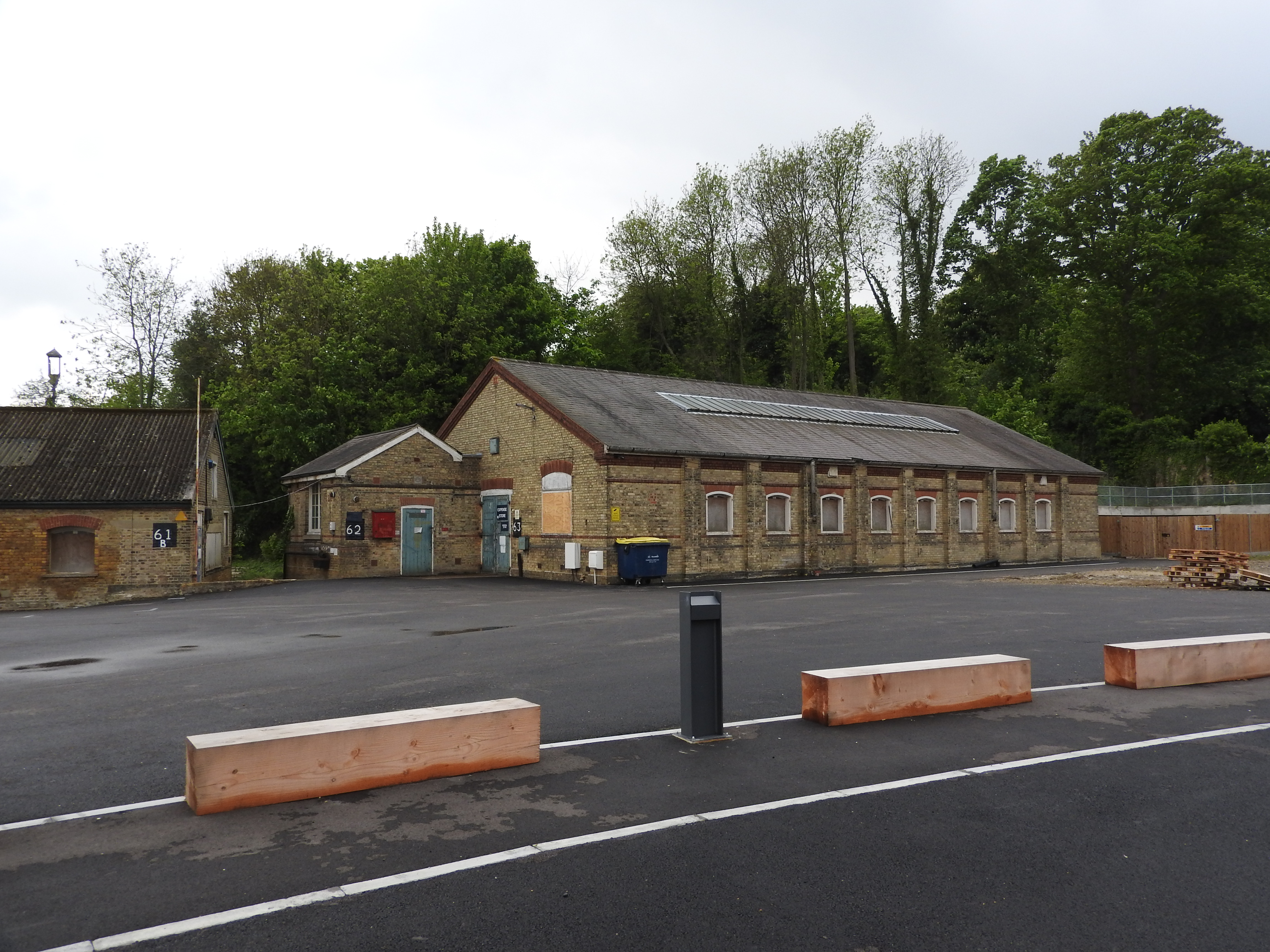
Left to right: former No 3 Shell Store (1883), Mine Testing Room (1905) and Wet Guncotton Store (1895)

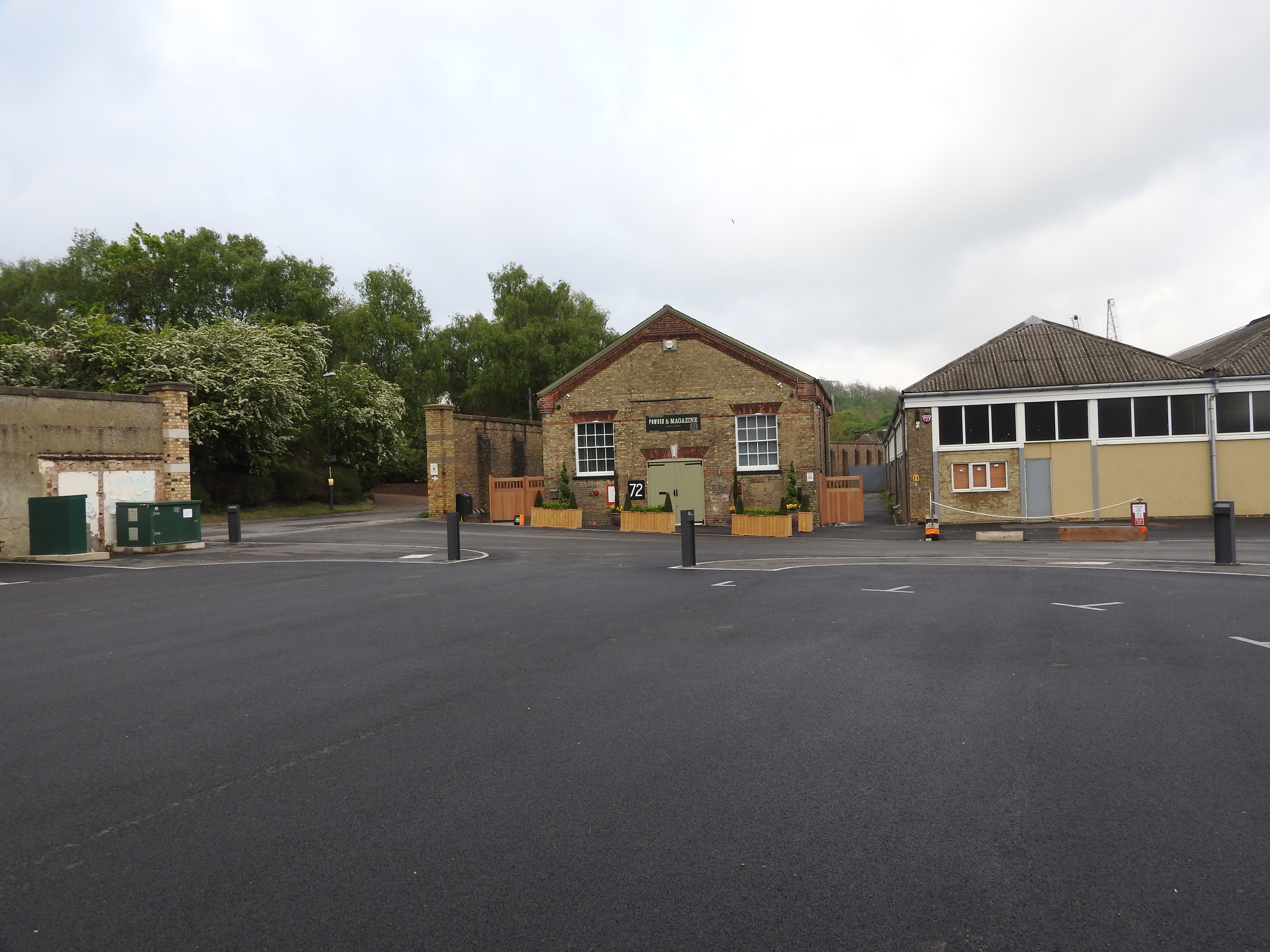
Left to right: main entrance, former filled Mine Store (1904), former filled Shell Store (1904)

=== The Military Railway ===
The British Army used this area to train a contingent from the 8th (Railway) Company Royal Engineers (RE). The British Army built a Standard Gauge Railway from Chattenden to Upnor during October 1872 to April 1873. This was abandoned before the 16 December 1881 and a 2 ft 6 in (762 mm) gauge line was built in 1885 or by the 8th (Railway) Company Royal Engineers (RE) on 23 September 1898. One branch went to Lower Upnor, and the other to the Army Camp by Tower Hill. This line was used to supply armaments from Chattenden, the Lodge Hill Ammunition Depot (LHAD) and the standard gauge at Sharnal Street, to the warships of the Royal Navy and the Upnor Magazine. The service closed on 19 May 1961.

From August 1965 to February 1967, the Royal Engineers converted the route from Lower Upnor to Chattenden into Upchat Road, including building the Royal Engineers Bridge over Four Elms Hill, where the Main Road and A228 go through the village of Chattenden.

=== The Royal Engineers ===
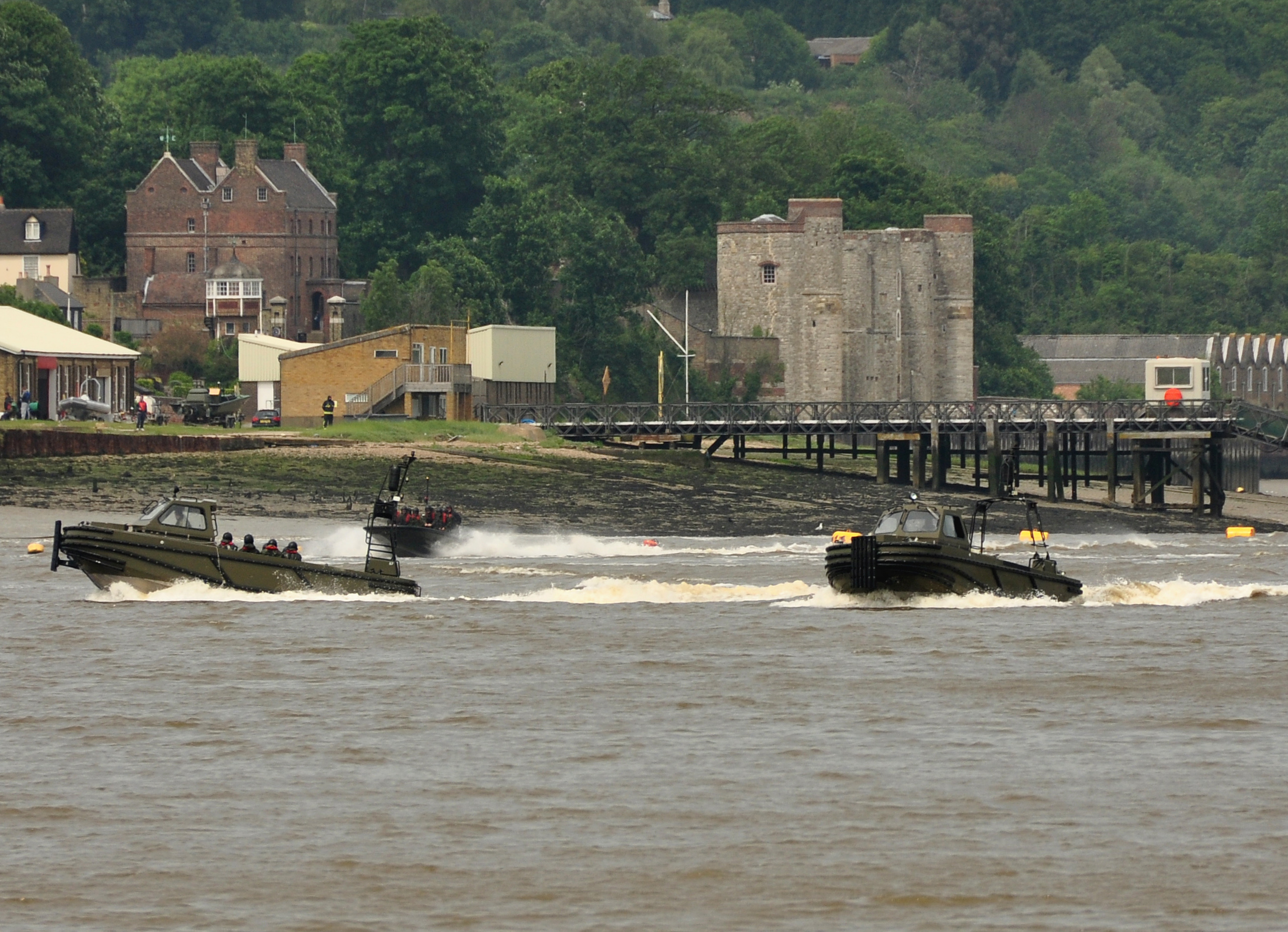
Royal Engineers Assault Boat training at Upper Upnor

The Royal Engineers still have a presence in Upper Upnor; the Riverine Operations Section (ROS) of the Royal School of Military Engineering maintains classrooms, workshops and a hard in Upnor for training Royal Engineers Assault Boat Operators and Watermanship Safety Officers, who continue to operate craft on global operations. The Riverine Operations Section (ROS) operates Mark 1 and Mark 3 Rigid Raiders, and combat support boats, as well as teaching use of the Mk 6 Assault Boat. The area is also used for other training purposes by the Royal School of Military Engineering including practice and test bomb disposal tasks by the Defence Explosive Ordnance Disposal School (DEODS), until its move to Bicester.

== See also ==
- Raid on the Medway
