= Defence Explosive Ordnance Disposal, Munitions and Search Training Regiment =

British Army regiment

- Active: 1970 – Present
- Country: United Kingdom
- Branch: British Army
- Type: Training
- Role: Training for handling explosive ordnance
- Garrison/HQ: Bicester, Oxfordshire

The Defence Explosive Ordnance Disposal, Munitions and Search Training Regiment (DEMS Training Regiment) is an element of the Royal School of Military Engineering responsible for the provision of training to British Army Ammunition Technicians, Ammunition Technical Officers and Search Operators. The Regiment provides training from two locations: Marlborough Barracks, MoD Kineton near Kineton, Warwickshire and St George's Barracks, MoD Bicester, near Bicester, Oxfordshire.

== History ==
In 2009 the Defence Explosive Ordnance Disposal, Munitions and Search School (DEMSS) was formed, bringing together the School of Ammunition, the Defence Explosive Ordnance Disposal School and the National Search Centre, initially as DEMSS (North), at Kineton, and DEMSS (South), at Chattenden, Kent. DEMSS was renamed DEMS Training Regiment in December 2012 when the Chattenden facility was closed and relocated to new premises at Bicester, only 30 miles from Kineton, in order to 'enable closer and more integrated training across all disciplines taught at DEMSS'. Each of the schools coming together to form the Regiment have a history that encompasses a number of sites in the UK, with ammunition management having been the preserve of the Royal Army Ordnance Corps (later amalgamated into the Royal Logistic Corps) and Bomb Disposal having been the responsibility of the Royal Engineers since the Second World War. The education and training to support this requirement has been delivered from:

=== Army School of Ammunition ===
==== Army School of Ammunition, Bramley ====
An element of the Training Establishment, Royal Army Ordnance Corps was established in 1922 at Bramley Central Ammunition Depot, a site established during the First World War to manufacture and store ammunition. Known for a time as 'B wing', it was placed under direct specialist control in 1950 and renamed the Army School of Ammunition.

==== Marlborough Barracks, near Kineton ====
A Base Ammunition Depot was built at Temple Herdewyke, near Kineton, in 1942. The Army School of Ammunition moved from Bramley to Kineton in 1974, as the former site became too small for the munitions natures being developed at the time.

=== Defence Explosive Ordnance Disposal School ===
==== School of Military Engineering, Ripon ====
The Royal School of Military Engineering was based in Chatham, Kent, but during the Second World War was split into two training Battalions, one of which was located at Harper Barracks (later Claro Barracks), Ripon, North Yorkshire. This site was identified as a home for the School of Bomb Disposal, formed in 1941, and reflecting the nomination of the Royal Engineers as being responsible for the discipline.

==== Joint Service Bomb Disposal School, Broadbridge Heath ====
The Joint Service Bomb Disposal School at Broadbridge Heath in West Sussex closed in 1966 and training moved to Lodge Hill, Chattenden, Kent.

==== DEODS Lodge Hill ====
The Royal School of Military Engineering took over the former Royal Naval Armaments Depots at Chattenden and Lodge Hill Military Camps in 1961. Both these adjacent sites became training areas for the relocated Joint Service Bomb Disposal School (renamed the Defence Explosive Ordnance Disposal School), which opened its new premises in Lodge Hill Camp in 1966. It shared its site and facilities with the National Search Centre, a joint Ministry of Defence/Home Office facility which provided specialist search and counter-terrorism training for the police and civil agencies.

=== Defence Explosive Ordnance Disposal, Munitions and Search School ===
The combined Defence Explosive Ordnance Disposal, Munitions and Search School (DEMSS) was set up in 2009, bringing activity at Kineton (which became DEMSS (North)) and Lodge Hill (DEMSS (South)) together under the same command. At the time, DEMSS (North) focused on munitions management training and Improvised Explosive Device Disposal (IEDD) training, whilst DEMSS (South) focused on Conventional Munitions Disposal training, search training and Biological and Chemical Munitions Disposal training. DEMSS (South) moved to Bicester in 2013; the Lodge Hill site was put up for sale in 2016.

== Organisation and training ==
DEMS Training Regiment delivers a number of courses to students from the Royal Navy, British Army, Royal Air Force, civilian bodies in government and to international partners. Four training squadrons deliver courses with munitions, search and conventional munitions or Explosive Ordnance Disposal at DEMSS South and Improvised Explosive Device Disposal at DEMSS North. Regimental HQ is based at Bicester, with two training squadrons at Bicester and two at Kineton. The four training squadrons are:

- Munitions Squadron – All aspects of academic elements of munitions theory, maintenance, storage, accounting, investigation processes and logistic disposal.
- Conventional Munitions Disposal Squadron – Disposal of unexploded ordnance and remnants of war
- Specialist Search Squadron – Location and identification of emplaced devices and concealed contraband material
- Improvised Explosive Device Disposal Squadron – All aspects of Improvised explosive device disposal in controlled and hostile environment
