= Shaftesbury Homes and Arethusa =

Children's charity in England

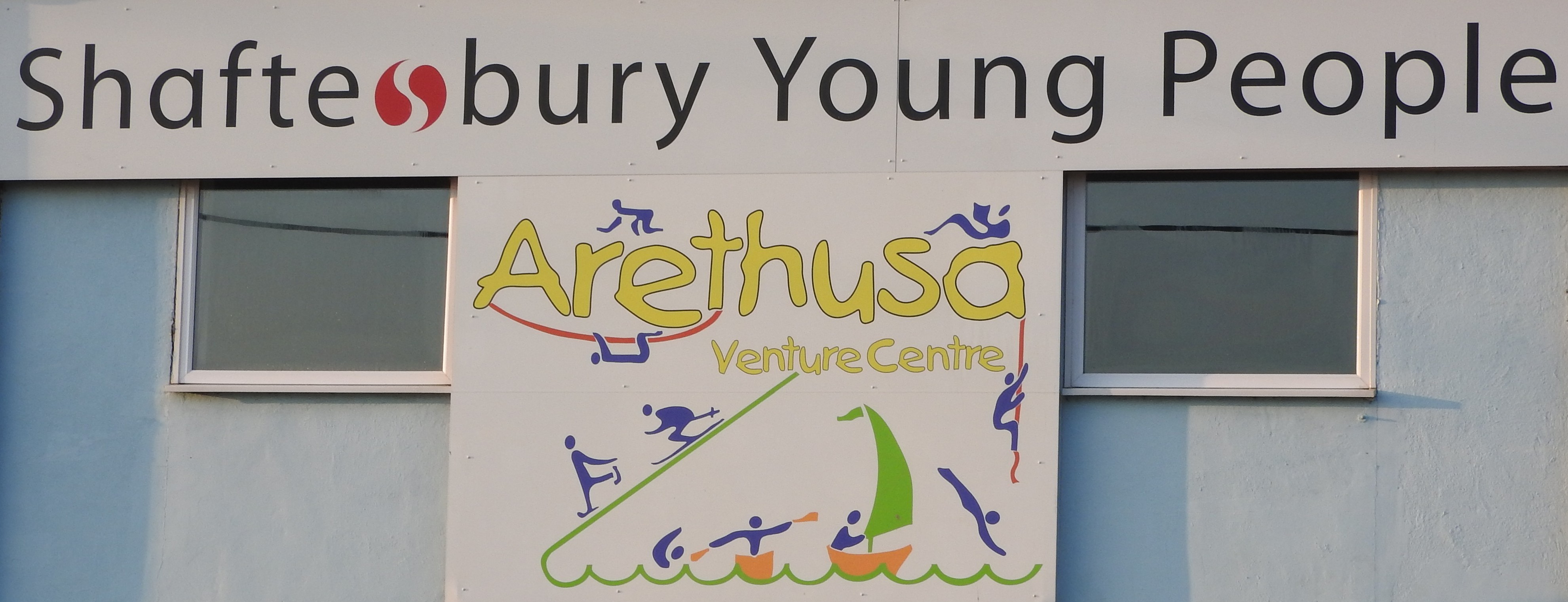
The Arethusa Venture Centre at Lower Upnor

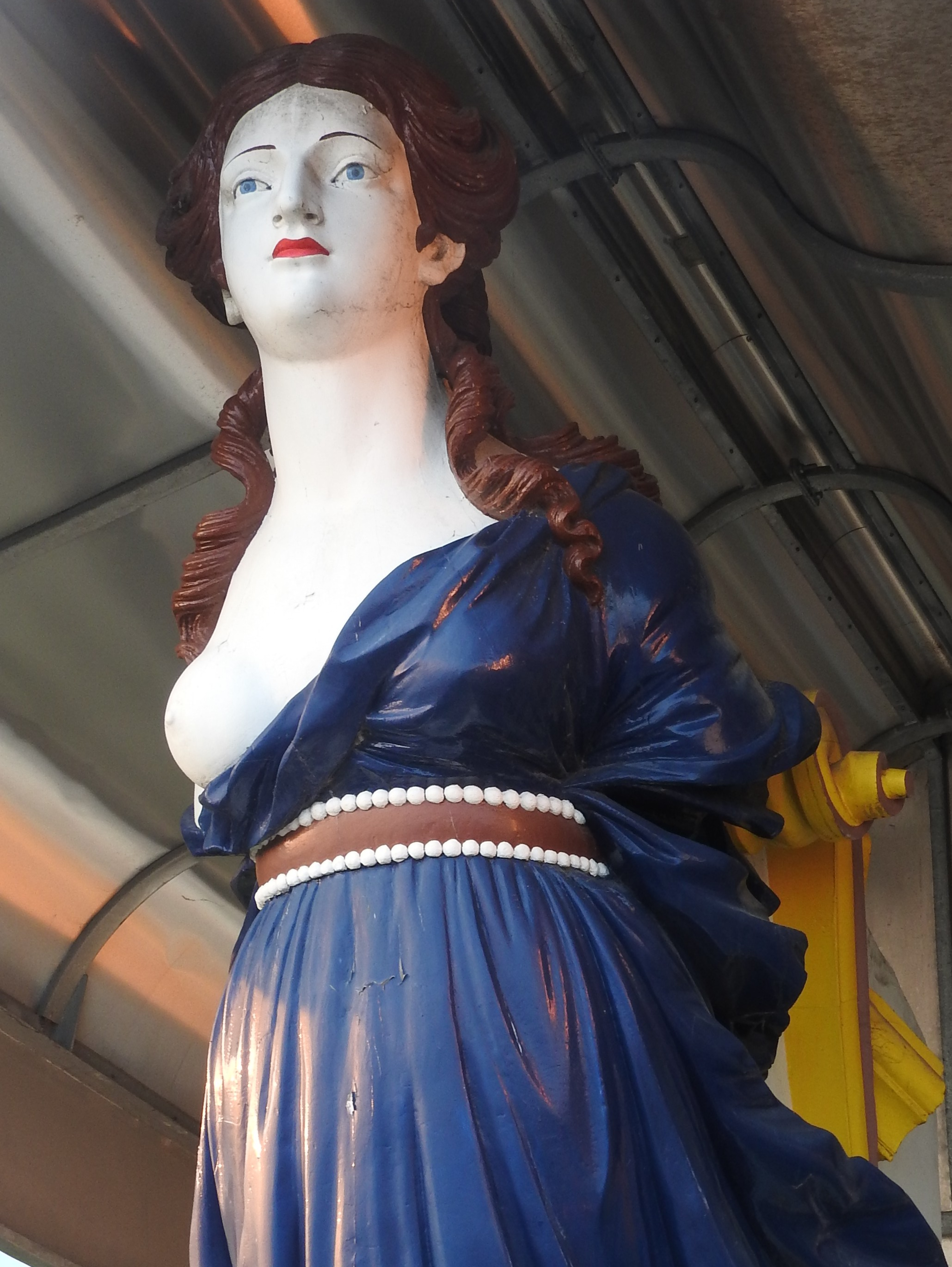
The figurehead of Arethusa at the Shaftesbury Young People centre on the River Medway

The Shaftesbury Homes and Arethusa (now Shaftesbury Young People) is one of the United Kingdom's oldest children's charities. It has been active since 1843. Its aim, written in its current mission statement, is to support young people in care and need to find their voice, to be healthy, to learn, develop and achieve and to gain an independent and positive place in society.

The charity moved from promoting the ragged schools to providing night refuges then providing residential nautical training. It operated many large children's homes, and currently supports adolescents leaving care. At each stage it changed its name to reflect its new role. In 2006 it became Shaftesbury Young People.

== History ==
The organisation dates back to 1843 when solicitor's clerk William Williams encountered a group of cold, dirty and rowdy London boys chained together and being transported to Australia. As a personal response to his horror, he opened a ragged school in the St Giles rookery, in a hayloft in Streatham Street. A year later in 1844, a group of London ragged schools banded together to form the Ragged School Union. Lord Ashley, who later inherited the title of Lord Shaftesbury became its president and thus got to know Williams.

=== Ragged school ===
Ragged schools taught the boys Christian beliefs, reading, writing and arithmetic and attempted to teach them a trade. In 1849, Streatham Street taught 314 boys and 18 of the scholars were seen as suitable to be awarded a free passage to Australia. It merged with two neighbouring schools in 1851 forming the St Giles and St George, Bloomsbury Ragged Schools. They also provided a night school and a Sunday school for girls with sewing classes. The next venture was to buy a permanent building on the corner of Broad Street and George Street. The temporary premises they vacated were converted into night refuges for homeless boys. As providing accommodation became more important they renamed themselves as St Giles and St George, Bloomsbury Refuge for Destitute Children Ragged and Industrial Schools. More premises were rented to create a refuge for boys in Arthur Street, while the girls remained for a time at Broad Street. In May 1860, forty girls were moved to Acton- and eventually to a home in Ealing. This house did all the other establishments laundry.

The Elementary Education Act 1870 reduced the need for ragged schools and to reflect this the society changed its name again; this time to The National Refuges for Homeless and Destitute Children and 'Chichester' Training Ship. It closed the last of its ragged schools in 1891.

=== Emigration ===
In June 1848, Lord Ashley made a speech in parliament proposing funds should be made available to assist suitable boys from ragged schools to emigrate to the colonies where they could easily find employment. This suggestion was enthusiastically supported by Williams and the Homes. Twenty two scholars were selected to be in the first group that left for New South Wales. Each was given a new suit of clothes and a Bible. In 1857 ten girls were escorted to Canada- and looked after till they were settled with a job. This led to the society renting a house in Hamilton, Ontario to act as a reception centre for the scholars. The society was involved with accompanied emigration until the 1920s

=== Training ships ===
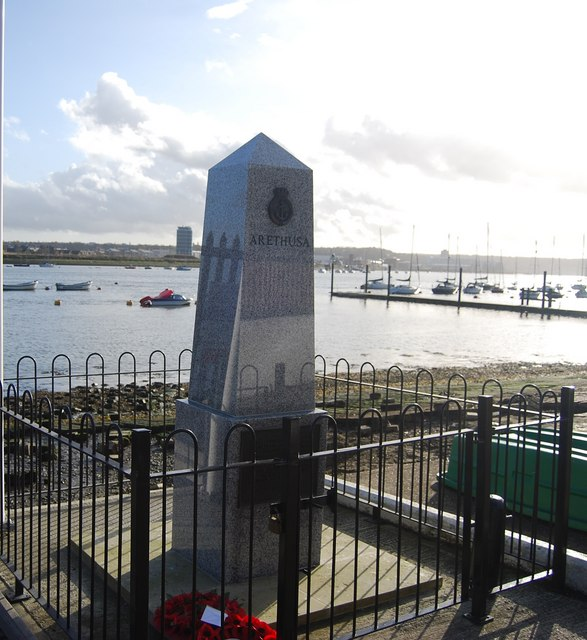
Arethusa Memorial, Lower Upnor

In January 1866, the Pall Mall Gazette revealed the dire conditions suffered by boys in the casual ward of the Lambeth Workhouse. Lord Shaftesbury became patron to the society, and he launched an initiative to take boys off the streets and give them onboard maritime training. They were soon resident on board the Chichester, a redundant naval frigate moored off Greenhithe which could house 250 boys at a time. This succeeded and by 1874, 1,300 boys had graduated. A second frigate was obtained thanks to a £5,000 donation from Lady Burdett-Coutts: this was the Arethusa and she was moored alongside the Chichester. In 1919 the society renamed itself as Shaftesbury Homes and Arethusa and the Prince of Wales, the future Edward VIII became president.

The move to Upnor on the River Medway occurred in 1933, when the Arethusa was broken up and replaced by the steel-hulled, four-masted barque Peking. Renamed Arethusa II, it was refitted in Chatham Dockyard and then moored across the River Medway, in Lower Upnor. The figurehead from the wooden warship was preserved and displayed by Arethusa Pier in Upnor. Shore-side accommodation and a swimming pool was built, and this continues today (2017) as the Arethusa Venture Centre. An ocean-going steam yacht, the Glen Strathallan was donated to the society in 1955.

By 1972 there was less call for sail-trained seamen, and the training school was scaled down. The Arethusa II became a floating boarding school for the next three years but needed much maintenance work and was sold in 1975 to the South Street Seaport museum in New York, which restored its original name Peking; it is now owned and berthed by the German Port Museum in Hamburg. A third, smaller 71 feet (22 m) ketch was bought in 1971 and renamed Arethusa. It had a different role and was replaced by another vessel in 1982.

=== Children's homes ===
The focus of the society changed and it sought to provide refuges outside London for London children. In 1868 the society purchased a farm in Bisley, Surrey. The first building, the Farm school was operational by 1871 and the second, Shaftesbury House, in 1873. The schools merged as a result of the 1918 Education Act. Surrey Education Committee took over the educational aspects in 1921, and the schools status changed from 'Elementary School' to 'Central School' in 1930. From 1944 until its closure in 1958 the school became a 'secondary school'.

A further boys home was opened at Fortescue House, Twickenham. A home for girls was opened at Sudbury Hall, Wembley. The society experienced financial pressures during both of the world wars. The Curtis Report and the Children Act 1948 changed the direction of child care: adoption became the preferred option followed by fostering and the large children's homes that the society had been running were deprecated. It was recommended that children's homes should have no more than 12 residents.

The larger homes were disposed of and the society moved to providing support for adolescents leaving care. Two adolescent hostels were opened Putney in 1975, and the long-standing premises in Esher House, East Molesley became a teenage mother and baby hostel. A support centre for parents having difficulty with their children was opened in Clapham.

In 2006, the charity renamed itself Shaftesbury Young People.

== See also ==
- Peking (ship)
