= Chattenden and Lodge Hill Military Camps =

British Army training camps

- Chattenden
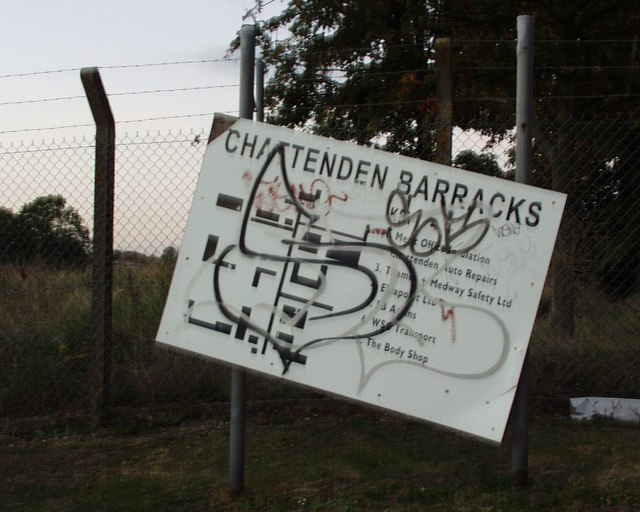
- Chattenden Barracks

Site information
- Type: Barracks
- Owner: Ministry of Defence
- Operator: British Army

Location
- Location within Kent
- Coordinates: 51.42154°N 0.52212°E

Site history
- Built: 1872
- Built for: War Office
- In use: 1872–2016

Chattenden and Lodge Hill Military Camps were British Army training camps in Chattenden and Hoo St Werburgh in Kent. Originally constructed as ordnance depots, these camps continued to fulfill this role until the latter half of the 20th century.

== Origins ==
After 1667 gunpowder began to be stored in Upnor Castle on the north/west bank of the River Medway. During the Napoleonic Wars a gunpowder magazine was built alongside the castle at Lower Upnor designed to store a further 10,000 barrels of gunpowder, followed in 1857 by another, larger magazine which could hold up to 23,000 barrels. Over the next fifty years a series of buildings were built along the riverside designed for filling and storing explosive shells, naval mines and torpedoes - all for use in Her Majesty's Ships and in the extensive fortifications surrounding Chatham and Sheerness Naval Dockyards.

=== Chattenden ===
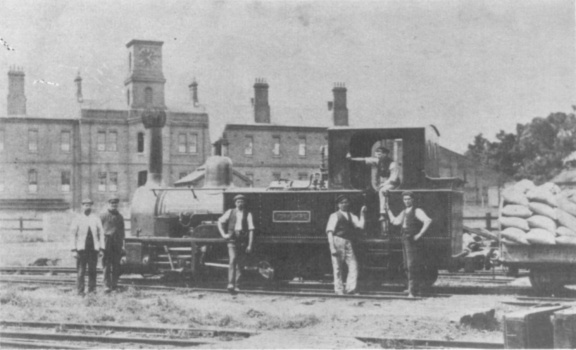
Narrow-gauge locomotive in front of Chattenden barracks

When it was realised that there was no room for further expansion of the storage facilities at Upnor, a nearby site inland at Chattenden was purchased, and in 1875 five magazines were built on a hillside (the contours of which helped provide a natural traverse for security and protection). Between them, the magazines were designed to hold 40,000 barrels of gunpowder (with space for more in times of war). Chattenden Barracks (completed 1872) was also built, a little to the south, to accommodate the eight officers and 120 men detailed to guard the site. The magazine compound and barracks were linked to Upnor by a narrow-gauge railway.

=== Lodge Hill ===
In 1891 the decision was taken to apportion Britain's ordnance depots (which were all at that time overseen by the War Office) either to the Navy or to the Army. Under the new arrangements Upnor was given to the Navy and Chattenden to the Army. Without Chattenden the Navy lacked sufficient storage space; this led to the development of the adjacent Lodge Hill site, opened in 1899, to provided space for a further dozen small magazines for storing cordite, dry guncotton and other highly explosive materials. Each magazine was surrounded by an earth mound (traverse) and all the individual buildings were linked by sidings connected to the aforementioned narrow-gauge railway line which also had an interchange at the eastern end of the new depot with a new standard-gauge railway (known as the Chattenden Naval Tramway) from here to Sharnal Street station on the South Eastern Railway (the first time a Naval Ordnance Depot had been connected to the main line railway network). For safety the structures were set apart from one another, and the intervening space was planted with dense woodland. Lodge Hill was initially known as Chattenden Royal Naval Ordnance Depot; but in 1903 the Navy took over the older Chattenden magazines as well, whereupon Upnor, Chattenden and Lodge Hill were each named Royal Naval Ordnance Depots.

== Later history ==
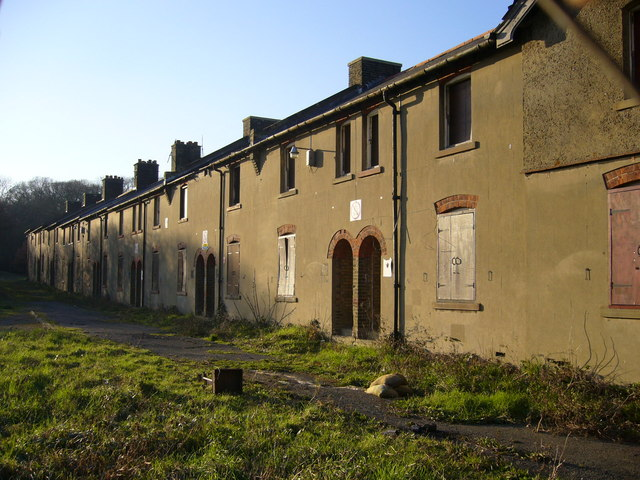
Central Terrace: built as Police Quarters for those guarding the depot at Chattenden, later used for Explosive Ordnance Search & Disposal training

As early as 1912 it was realised that the Lodge Hill and Chattenden Magazines were vulnerable to air attack. A surviving First World War anti-aircraft emplacement on Chattenden Ridge is of historic importance: it may have been the first anti-aircraft emplacement in the world, and was almost certainly the first in Britain. Nevertheless, Chattenden and Lodge Hill continued to be used for ammunition storage through both World Wars, until 1961. Thereafter, the site was used as extensive barracks and training facilities for the Royal School of Military Engineering (RSME). The Joint Service Bomb Disposal School moved here from Broadbridge Heath in 1966.

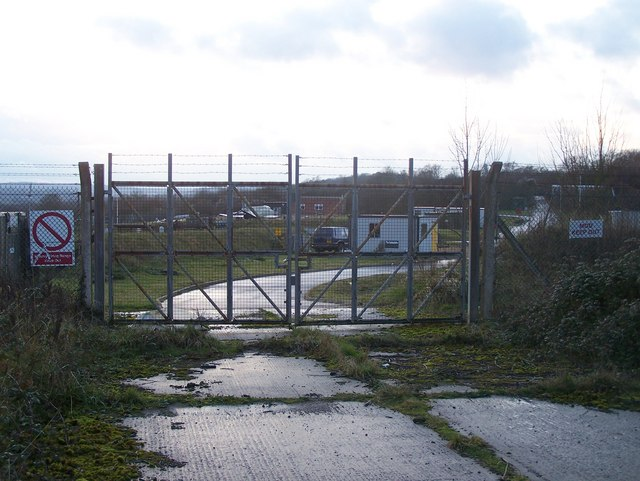
Entrance to Lodge Hill Camp Firing Range

The 1870s magazines at Chattenden remain in situ (though vulnerable to subsidence – a problem first identified soon after their completion); they were latterly used for general storage. Several magazines and other structures also survive at Lodge Hill. The 1872 Barracks quadrangle, with its central clock tower, was vacated in 1961 and demolished; (the clock itself was moved to Portsmouth Royal Dockyard and not long afterwards was installed in the pediment of No. 11 Storehouse alongside HMS Victory). The following year a new barracks for RSME was built on the site; this remained in use until the 1990s and was itself demolished in 2005. The Defence Explosive Ordnance Disposal School was housed in a separate complex (Lodge Hill Camp) along with the National Search Centre (a joint Ministry of Defence / Home Office facility providing training in Explosive Ordnance Disposal and search training for the police and other civilian agencies). The surrounding landscape provided training areas for these institutions; a pair of Victorian terraces, which once housed the on-site police force, were used for explosives search training and other structures were built expressly for this purpose. Bridge-building and other engineering training also took place on the site, and there was a specialist diver training facility in Lodge Hill Camp.

== Present day ==
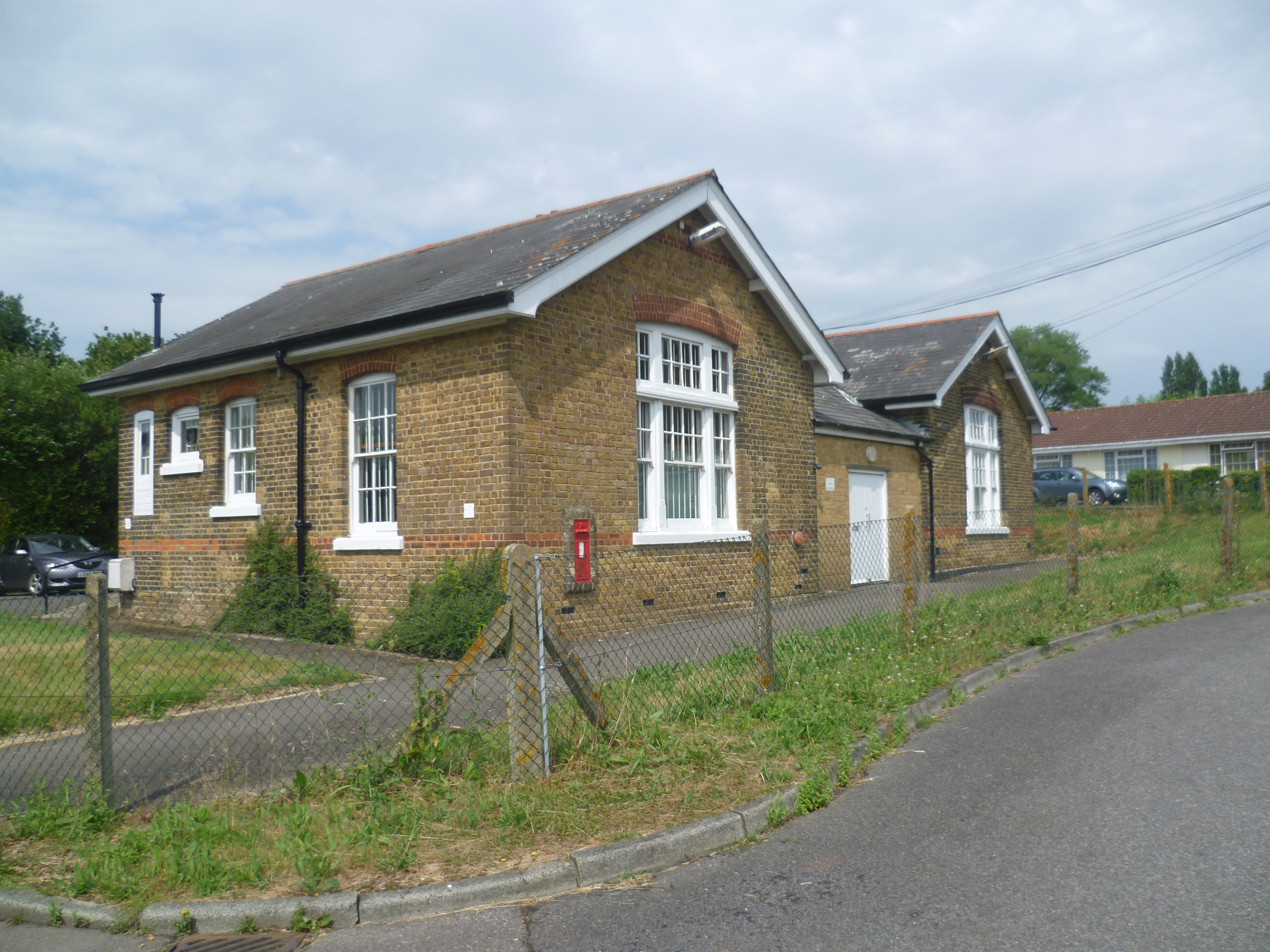
Former Police Office by the outer gate of the magazine compound at Chattenden

Chattenden and Lodge Hill Training Areas continued to be used into the 21st century, preparing personnel for active service in Iraq and Afghanistan. In 2007 the Ministry of Defence designated the Military Land as a brownfield area for redevelopment for residential and light industrial use. The RSME continues to operate a training facility in nearby Upper Upnor, and the Defence Explosive Ordnance Disposal School has relocated to a new facility, which opened in 2013, on the former St George's Barracks site in Bicester.

A plan had been worked up for 5000 houses on the site in a £1bn scheme. The Lodge Hill camp however is home to 85 singing male nightingales, which is over 1% of the entire UK population which stands at 6000. Natural England have declared this an SSSI. (Note: Owen Sweeney of the Medway Countryside Forum said "... the blackthorn and bramble scrub, as well as the coppiced ancient woodland, was a wonderful habitat for the extremely shy bird, which spends 12 weeks or so on the 815-acre site before wintering in west Africa. "These are the remaining green lungs amid the sprawling development around: Medway is full,...") Nightingales migrate several thousand miles to West Africa and then return to the same tree, making biodiversity offsetting (Note: A scheme where sensitive land is developed in exchange for the provision of similar piece of habitat in the region) inappropriate for the species.

In 2016 the MOD put the Lodge Hill and Chattenden site up for sale.

== Sources ==
- Saunders, A. D. (1 January 1985). Upnor Castle: Kent. English Heritage. ISBN 978-1-85074-039-1.
