= Broadbridge Heath =

Village and parish in West Sussex, England

Coordinates: 51.07137°N 0.35909°W

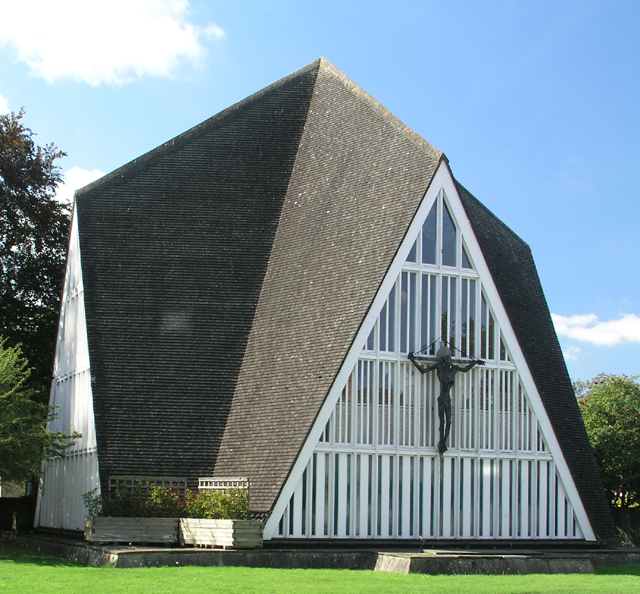
- St John's Church in 2006, with sculpture by Edward Bainbridge Copnall

- Location within West Sussex
- Area: 2.16 km^{2} (0.83 sq mi)
- Population: 3,021 2001 Census; 3,112 (2011 Census)
  - Density: 1,401/km^{2} (3,630/sq mi)
- OS grid reference: TQ150315
  - London: 31 miles (50 km) NNE
- Civil parish: Broadbridge Heath
- District: Horsham
- Shire county: West Sussex
- Region: South East
- Country: England
- Sovereign state: United Kingdom
- Post town: HORSHAM
- Postcode district: RH12
- Dialling code: 01403
- Police: Sussex
- Fire: West Sussex
- Ambulance: South East Coast
- UK Parliament: Horsham
- Website: Parish Council

Broadbridge Heath is a village and civil parish in the Horsham district of West Sussex, England. It is about two miles (3 km) west from the historic centre of Horsham. The population of Broadbridge Heath has increased considerably in the first two decades of the twenty-first century because of large scale housing development (79% from 2013 to 2019 according to Office For National Statistics).

== History ==
The earliest evidence of human activity in what is now Broadbridge Heath dates to the Mesolithic period, in the form of flint implements found in the Wickhurst Green area. Later evidence of settlement in the parish includes several Iron Age roundhouses.

The land now occupied by Broadbridge Heath was originally a detached portion of the parish of Sullington, part of a mediaeval system of transhumance whereby villagers from downland villages would drive their livestock into the Low Weald to graze on acorns, grass and beech mast. A manor at Broadbridge was occupied by Roger Covert in the 1290s.

The village began as a scattered group of houses around an unenclosed common before the 19th century, and by 1844 there were about twelve houses and an inn. Deposits of Horsham Stone have long been quarried in the area and in 2016 one working quarry existed to west of the village. In spite of the enclosure of the heath in the 1850s, there was little further development until the late 1880s when land along the main Horsham to Five Oaks Road was offered for sale and a number of semi-detached houses were built there over the next 13 years.

After the Second World War, the pace of development increased and large new housing estates were built to the south of the village. In August 1950 the Headquarters for Bomb Disposal Units (UK), Royal Engineers moved to a site on Wickhurst Lane; in 1951 the School of Bomb Disposal, which had been based in Chatham since 1949, arrived on site so that it was co-located with the Headquarters. In 1959 it was renamed the Joint Service Bomb Disposal School. The Bomb Disposal School moved out to Lodge Hill in 1966 and a supermarket and leisure centre were built on the vacant land in the 1980s.

The opening of the A264 Broadbridge Heath by-pass in the 1970s reduced traffic congestion in the village.

In 2013-16 a development of 1,500 houses was constructed to the south of the Horsham by-pass, under the name Wickhurst Green. As part of this development, in March 2014, West Sussex County Council proposed a new 'Quadrant' area south of the village, that would include a new leisure centre and other recreational services to serve Horsham but to be built in Broadbridge Heath.

== Facilities ==
=== Social ===
- A village centre and social club, also home to Horsham Sea Cadets unit, T.S. Glory.
- A scout hall, home to several Scouting organisations, but also used for charity and social functions.
- Several playground areas in Cook Way, Pelling Way, Findon Way, Charrington Way, the Village Centre Recreation Ground and the Village Green; a large recreation ground with a pond known locally as "The Ducky"

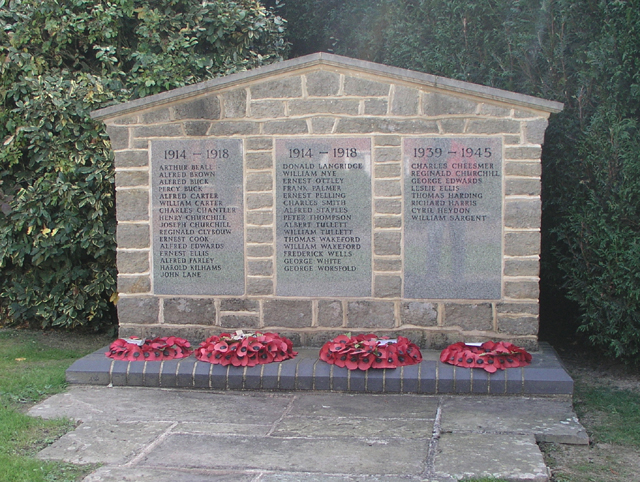
War Memorial, Broadbridge Heath

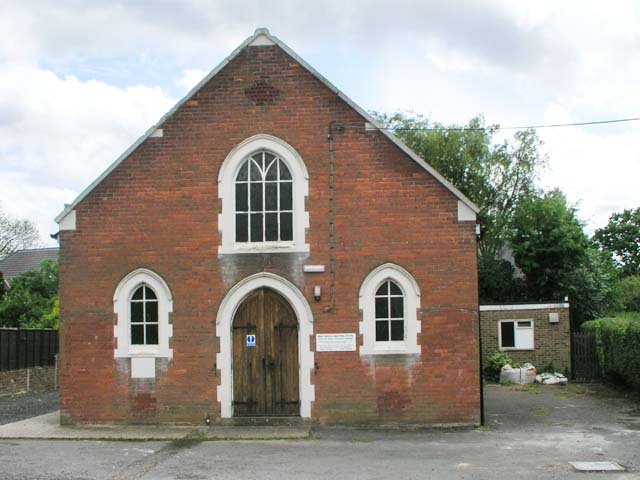
Brethren's Meeting Room

=== Religion ===
- St John's Church (Anglican) - a modern church built in the 1960s. In 1964, a sculpture of Jesus Christ, created by Edward Bainbridge Copnall was placed on the church. Made from coal dust and resin, it was removed from the facade of the church in December 2008 to Horsham Museum and Art Gallery. Rev Ewen Souter, the vicar at St John's Church said it was "a horrifying depiction of pain and suffering" that "scared children and deterred worshippers". It has since been replaced with a glass cross.
- A Plymouth Brethren meeting room.

=== Education ===
Shelley Primary School, located on Wickhurst Lane provides education for boys and girls aged between 4 and 11 years.

=== Sport and leisure ===
Broadbridge Heath has a Non-League football club Broadbridge Heath F.C. who play at the High Wood Hill Sports Ground next to the Bridge Leisure Centre. The Bridge Leisure Centre consists of a full size running track, athletic facilities and football pitch as well as the District's Indoor bowls Centre. The Grenadian Olympic Team trained at the Centre in the weeks preceding the London 2012 Olympic Games, at which Kirani James won Grenada's first Olympic gold medal in the men's 400m. Horsham Amateur Operatic and Dramatic Society (HAODS) are also based at The Bridge Leisure Centre.

Broadbridge Heath also has a cricket club whose two teams play in the Sussex Cricket League (which is the biggest league in the UK) and the Sussex Slam during midweek. Closely linked with the cricket club is the Broadbridge Heath Stoolball Club. On the same site, Broadbridge Heath Tennis Club have two courts. All these three clubs are situated at the 'Top Common' in the village.

== Transport ==
The village is situated at the junction of the A24 and the A264 roads. Bus services serving the village are operated by Arriva Southern Counties, Compass Travel, Metrobus and Sussex Coaches. The nearest railway station is at Christ's Hospital although Horsham has more frequent services. The nearest airport is London Gatwick.

== Notable residents ==
The poet Percy Bysshe Shelley, was born at Field Place, which stands about 1 mile (1.6 km) north of the village.

The bestselling novelist Georgette Heyer lived at the Swan Ken cottage in Broadbridge Heath, for six months from April 1931.
