= Royal Naval Armament Depot =

Armament depot

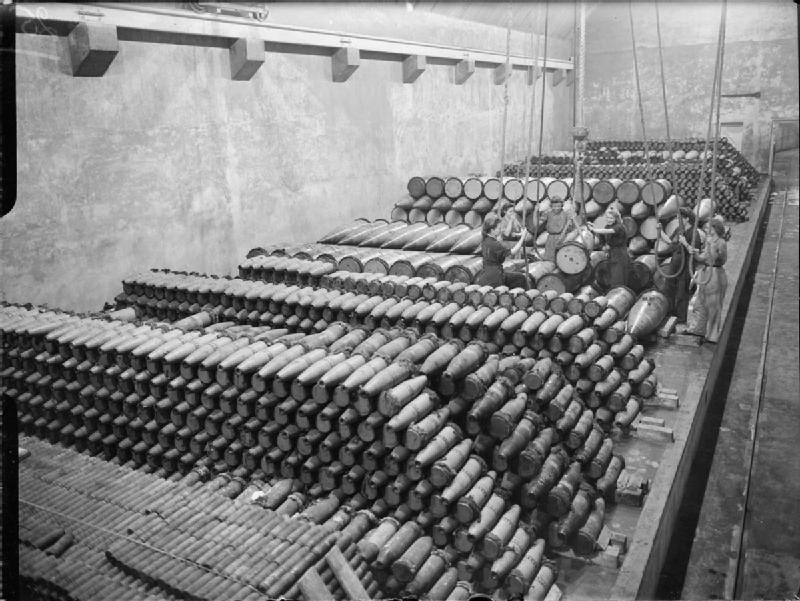
RNAD Dean Hill: photograph taken inside Magazine No. 16 during the Second World War.

A Royal Naval Armament Depot (RNAD) is an armament depot (or a group of depots) dedicated to supplying the Royal Navy (as well as, at various times, the Royal Air Force, the British Army, and foreign and Commonwealth forces). They were sister depots of Royal Naval Cordite Factories, Royal Naval Torpedo and Royal Naval Mine Depots. The only current RNAD is RNAD Coulport, which is the UK Strategic Weapon Facility for the nuclear-armed Trident Missile System, with many others being retained as tri-service 'Defence Munitions' sites.

Historically, several of these depots played a key role in Britain's military history. In the early modern period, Britain's national defences were developed along different lines than those that emerged on the continent of Europe. Rather than focusing on having a large army and heavily fortified cities, England (and then Great Britain) built up its navy. In this period, Britain's principal ordnance stores were planned with ease of access for the Navy in mind. Whereas on the continent, guns and gunpowder were kept in fortified strongholds where they were accessible to the field armies and garrisons based there, in Britain they were stored as close as possible to the Royal Navy Dockyards, to facilitate the transfer of armaments between the depots and warships, but not too close to minimise the risk of any accident or explosion in the depot causing damage to warships.

== History ==
=== Under the Board of Ordnance ===
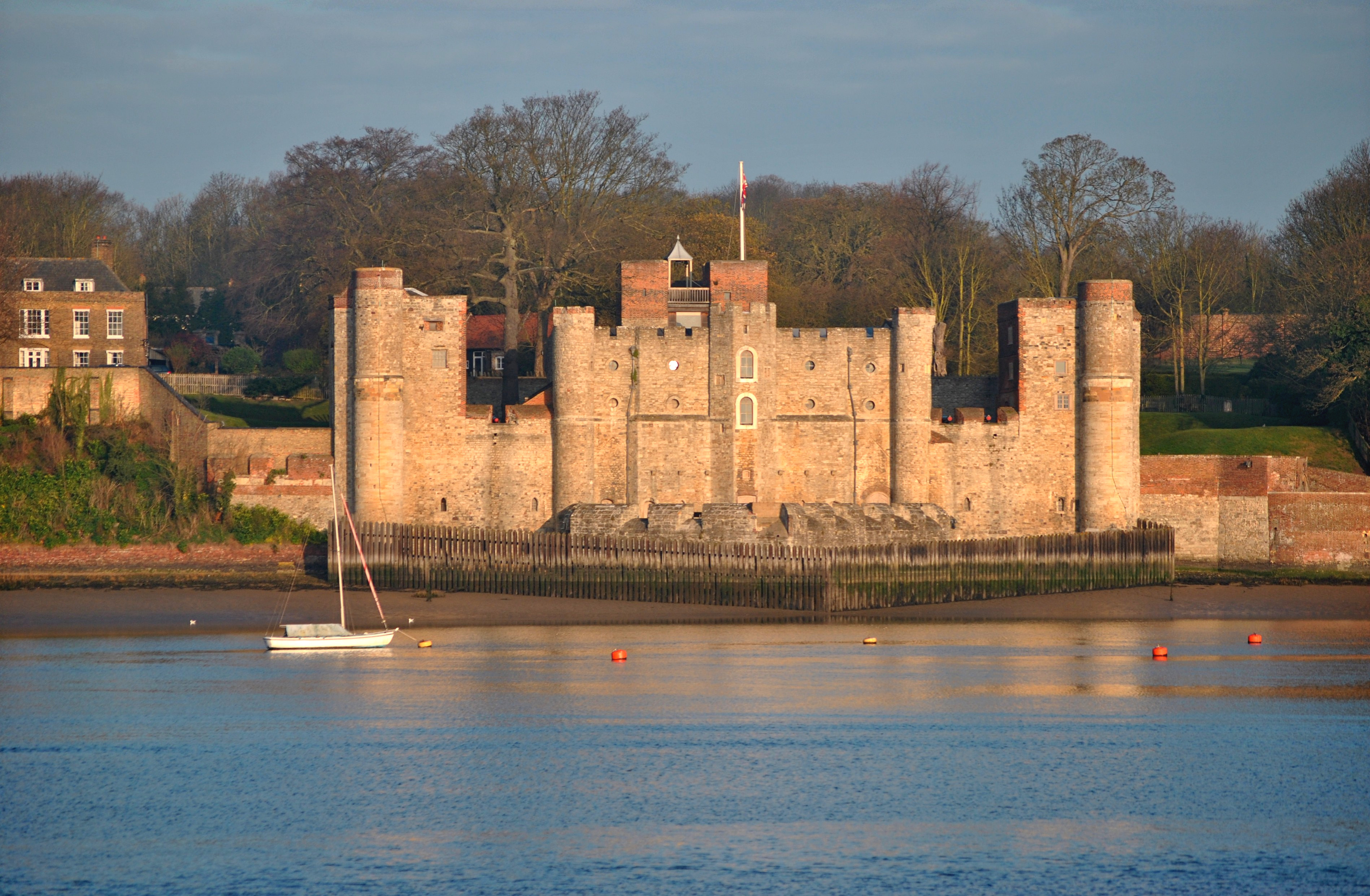
Upnor Castle served as a magazine and store from 1668 to 1913, and continued in military use (as part of RNAD Upnor) until 1945.

The earliest Ordnance Depots, several of which later became RNADs, were built by the Board of Ordnance (an autonomous office of the state, based at the Tower of London). The Board of Ordnance was responsible for all forts and armaments within the United Kingdom as well as the British Empire; it provided ordnance and ammunition for both naval and military uses.

In the Tudor period, the Board maintained 'gun wharves' close to each Royal Navy Dockyard and Anchorage where cannons, shot, small arms, and other items were kept available ready for naval use. Gunpowder was stored separately (initially in nearby fortified structures such as Portsmouth's Square Tower, Plymouth's Royal Citadel, and Upnor Castle on the River Medway). After 1671, the gun wharf at Woolwich Dockyard was extended to the east and by 1700 ammunition was being assembled on the site, which soon expanded to become the Board's principal manufacturing facility (later named the Royal Arsenal).

In the 1720s, the Board of Ordnance consolidated its gunwharf activity within new, purpose-built sites at Chatham, Portsmouth and Devonport). Some years later, the Board began to design and build gunpowder magazine depots (nearby, but at a more-or-less safe distance): at Priddy's Hard near Gosport (from 1771) and at Keyham Point near Devonport (from 1775). The Thames dockyards were served by the Board's central magazine complex at Purfleet, as were the yards on the Medway (where Upnor Castle continued to serve as an interim store).

In times of conflict the demand for provision (and therefore storage) of gunpowder grew, so additional magazines were built during the French Revolutionary Wars at Tipner (from 1788) and Weedon (from 1802), and during the Napoleonic Wars at Upnor (from 1806) and Marchwood (from 1811). During the Crimean War a new magazine depot was begun in 1851 at Bull Point near Plymouth (replacing Keyham, where the site was required for Dockyard expansion); and at the same time new magazines were built at Tipner, Weedon, Upnor and Marchwood, more than doubling capacity in most cases. In addition to these (and a number of temporary magazines established when and where they were needed) significant use was made of obsolete warships to serve as floating magazines; (this strategy continued through to the Second World War, when Implacable and Foudroyant were thus employed).

=== Under the War Office ===
When the Board of Ordnance was abolished in 1855 control of its assets passed to the War Office; they were overseen by a series of different military authorities:

- The Military Store Department (1857–1869)
- The Control Department (1870–1875)
- The Ordnance Store Department (1875–1891).

This period coincided with a revolution in naval ordnance, with new gun and shell technology being developed for a new generation of ironclad warships. An emphasis was placed on adapting the established depots to handling the new ammunition, rather than on establishing new depot sites (although much needed additional storage space was provided in 1875 when a new magazine complex was opened at Chattenden near Upnor).

Some depots began to develop a manufacturing role alongside that of storage: a factory opened on Portsmouth Gunwharf in 1863 for making gun carriages; together with the 'Royal Laboratory' across the harbour on Priddy's Hard, it was designated and managed as a Royal Ordnance Factory. Over the next two decades, the aforementioned Laboratory (established some years earlier for cartridge and small-arms ammunition manufacture) developed into a facility for shell-filling, an activity which soon outgrew its initial accommodation and spread into new purpose-built complexes at this and most of the other magazine depots.

=== Under the Admiralty ===
==== Naval Ordnance Store Department (1891–1918) ====
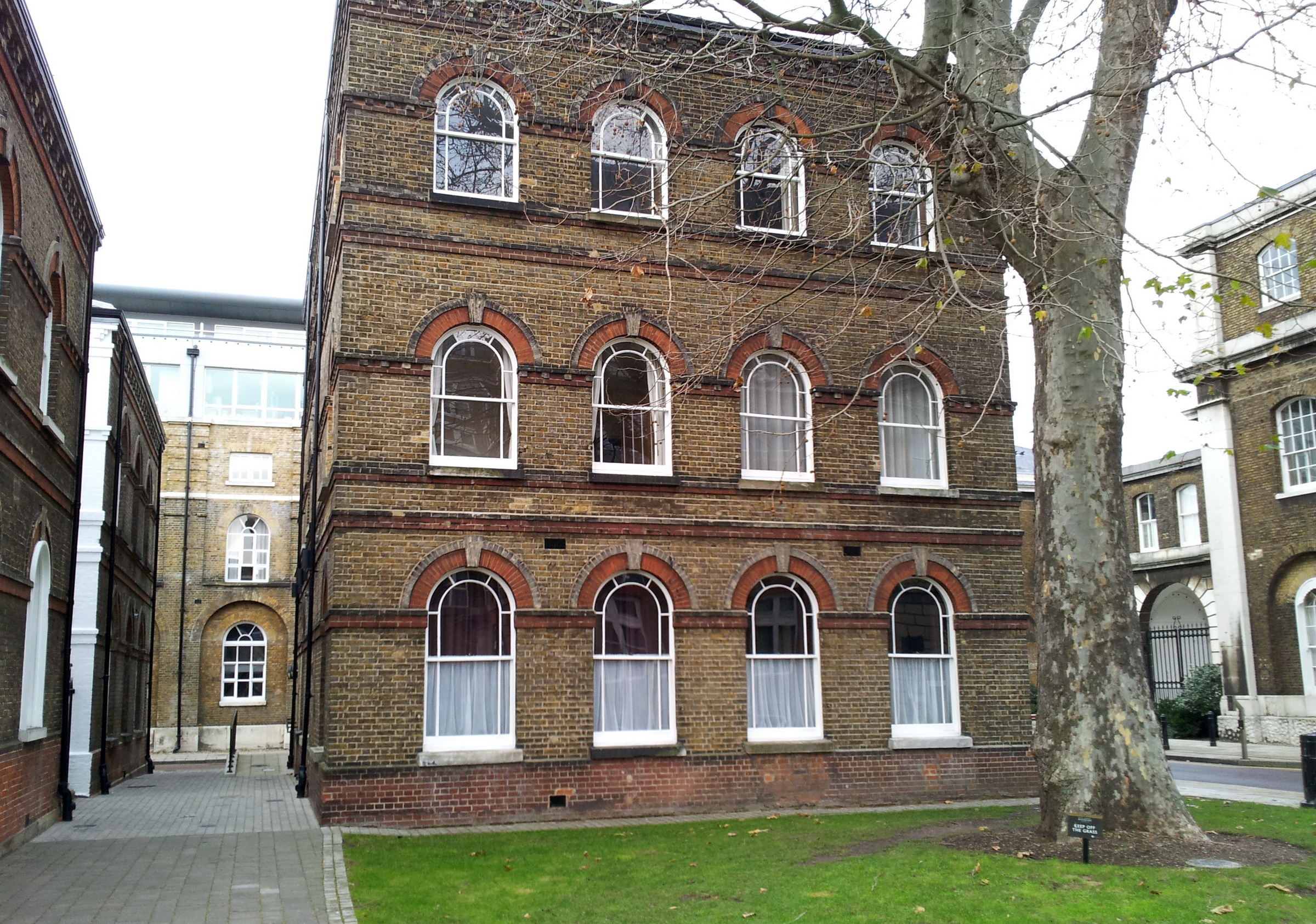
Building 21, Royal Arsenal, Woolwich: Headquarters of the Naval Ordnance Store Department and its successors until 1967.

In 1891, the decision was taken to divide responsibility for armament provision (for the army and the navy respectively) between the War Office and the Admiralty, with assets (including premises, personnel, equipment and supply vessels) being divided between the two services. For their part, the Admiralty established a new Naval Ordnance Store Department, based at the Royal Arsenal, Woolwich and overseen by the Director of Naval Ordnance, to manage them.

As part of this process, the gunwharves at Portsmouth and Chatham were each divided in two between the Navy and the Army, as were storage facilities at Woolwich Arsenal; at Plymouth the Devonport gun wharf remained with the Army, so a new naval gunwharf was set up within part of the Royal William Victualling Yard. Other ordnance locations (including some which were initially divided) ended up either with one service or the other; those that remained with the Army included Purfleet, Tipner and Weedon ordnance depots.

A memorandum of 18 January 1892 stated that:

... the Official designations of the Naval Ordnance Depots at the undermentioned places will be as follows:
Woolwich: H.M. Naval Gunwharf, Woolwich Arsenal;
Priddy's Hard: H.M. Naval Magazine;
Portsmouth: H.M. Gunwharf;
Plymouth: H.M. Naval Gunwharf;
Bull Point, Devonport: H.M. Naval Magazine;
Chatham: H.M. Naval Gunwharf;
Upnor, Rochester: H.M. Naval Magazine.

By the start of the 20th century, however, all these facilities were officially known as Royal Naval Ordnance Depôts (as were the smaller depots belonging to the Admiralty, both at home and overseas).

It was only in the last decade of the nineteenth century that gunpowder began to lose its primacy in ordnance manufacture. Cordite was patented in 1889 and soon found widespread use as a smokeless propellant; and from 1896 lyddite began to replace gunpowder in explosive shells. Guncotton (patented in 1846 but little used subsequently due to hazards inherent in its manufacture) eventually came to be used in naval mines and torpedoes. By the end of the century the ordnance depots were being expanded and adapted to provide specialist storage magazines for these explosives, alongside substantial separate storehouses for shells and mines. (Torpedoes, and later mines, were stored in their own separate depots.) The storage requirements of cordite and dry guncotton in particular led to the characteristic layout of depots in the twentieth century: as series of small, individually traversed, lightly roofed, single-storey buildings interlinked by narrow-gauge railways.

Several new Depots were established during, or in the run up to, the First World War, including a number in Scotland, where new naval dockyards had opened at Rosyth and Invergordon.

==== Armament Supply Department (1918–1964) ====
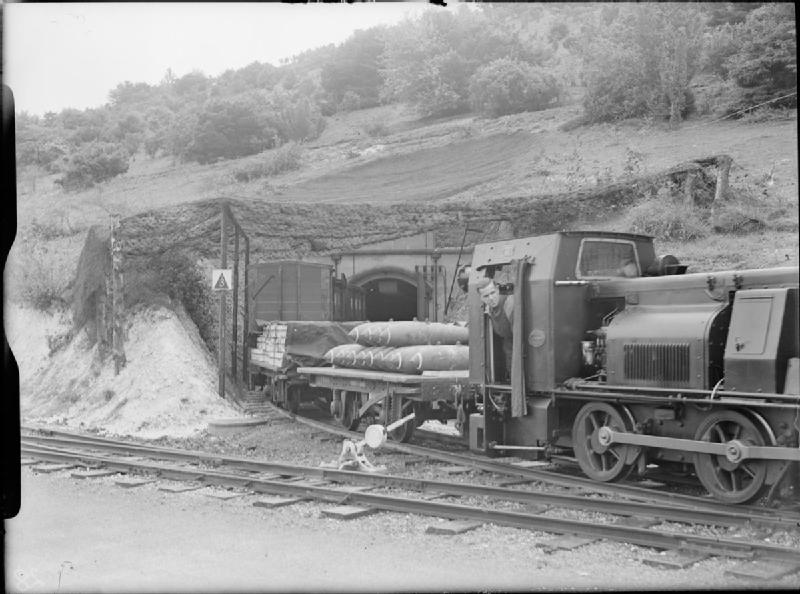
Entrance to one of the underground magazines at Dean Hill in the early 1940s.

On 23 December 1918, the Naval Ordnance Store Department was renamed the Armament Supply Department and its depots were likewise renamed Royal Naval Armament Depots (RNAD) in 1920. The change of nomenclature recognised the inclusion of torpedoes and naval mines (which had been managed separately during the war) alongside ordnance as part of the new department's responsibilities.

The vulnerability of the armament depots to air strikes was now acknowledged, so the Admiralty explored the feasibility of building magazines underground, initially at Ernesettle (just north of Bull Point, Plymouth) where four such magazines were built and at the recently established RNAD Crombie (near HM Dockyard, Rosyth) where six were built. Despite the cost, and sustained resistance from HM Treasury, plans were then laid down for the development of several far larger subterranean depots, with sixty magazines proposed at Dean Hill (near Salisbury) and ninety at Trecŵn (near Fishguard). Approval for these was only given in 1938–39, when war seemed all but inevitable, and they took several years to build; in the meantime a temporary depot was established (and later made permanent) on the site of a former colliery at Broughton Moor in West Cumberland. Once war was declared, however, the development of similar underground complexes was abandoned in favour of faster solutions, with railway tunnels, warehouses and other improvised locations made use of. Thus, whereas in early 1939 only five home RNADs were listed in the Navy List (viz. Woolwich, Portsmouth, Plymouth, Chatham and Crombie), by 1945 over thirty are mentioned, in addition to these five, with nine more RNADs in various locations listed as sub-depots of the 'Central Naval Armament Supply Depots, Wolverhampton'. Similarly overseas, the 1939 list of seven RNADs (Gibraltar, Malta, Hong Kong, Singapore, Simon's Town, Bermuda and Ceylon) had grown to a list of over twenty (with several more sub-depots in addition).

The Armament Supply Department continued in operation until 1965.

=== Under the Ministry of Defence ===
On 1 January 1965, control of the naval armament depots passed to the Ministry of Defence and they became part of the Royal Naval Supply and Transport Service (RNSTS). The RNSTS was formed from an amalgamation of the Directorates of Naval Stores, Victualling, Armament Supply, and Movements.

On 1 April 1994, the RNSTS ceased to exist and was absorbed into the Naval Support Command. At first renamed the 'Warship Support Agency', it went on to form part of the tri-service Defence Logistics Organisation, which is now part of the Defence Equipment and Support (DE&S) conglomerate. The RNADs also lost their independence; those RNADs that are still in use today are known as Defence Munitions centres (DM, e.g. DM Beith), with the aforementioned exception of RNAD Coulport.

== List of RNADs and their status ==
=== In Britain and Ireland ===
Name	County	Country	Years active	Status	Notes
RNAD Antrim	Antrim	N. Ireland		Closed	
— RNAD Crossgar	Down	N. Ireland		Closed	(sub depot of RNAD Antrim)
— RNAD Kilnappy	Co. Londonderry	N. Ireland		Closed	(sub depot of RNAD Antrim)
RNAD Beith	Ayrshire	Scotland	1943–	operational as DM Beith	
— RNAD Auchemade Quarry	Ayrshire	Scotland		Closed	(sub depot of RNAD Beith)
RNAD Broughton Moor	Cumbria	England	1939–1992	Decommissioned	Leased to other NATO countries from 1963.
RNAD Bull Point	Devon	England	1852–2009	Closed	
RNAD Charlesfield	Roxburghshire	Scotland	1945–1962	Closed	Established on the site of a World War II incendiary bomb factory.
RNAD Chatham (gunwharf)	Kent	England	1717–1958	Closed	
RNAD Coulport	Argyllshire	Scotland	1968–	Operational	UK strategic nuclear weapon facility
RNAD Crombie	Fife	Scotland	1915–	Operational as DM Crombie	Built to serve Rosyth Naval Dockyard
— RNAD Bandeath	Stirlingshire	Scotland	1916–1978	Closed	Storage magazines (sub depot of RNAD Crombie)
— RNAD Grangemouth	Stirlingshire	Scotland	1917–	Closed	Mining depot (sub depot of RNAD Crombie)
— RNAD Leadburn	Peeblesshire	Scotland		Closed	(sub depot of RNAD Crombie)
RNAD Dalbeattie	Kirkcudbrightshire	Scotland	1946–1960	Closed	Established on the site of a World War II explosives factory.
RNAD Dean Hill	Wiltshire	England	1941–2004	Closed	Underground magazine facility (latterly DM Dean Hill)
RNAD Ditton Priors	Shropshire	England	1941–1968	Closed	now an industrial estate
RNAD Ernesettle	Devon	England	1925–	Operational as DM Plymouth	Underground magazine facility
RNAD Glen Douglas	Argyllshire	Scotland	1966–	Operational as DM Glen Douglas	
RNAD Fort William	Inverness-shire	Scotland		Closed	(sub depot of RNAD Crombie)
— RNAD Achdalieu	Inverness-shire	Scotland		Closed	(sub depot of RNAD Fort William)
— RNAD Annat	Inverness-shire	Scotland		Closed	(sub depot of RNAD Fort William)
— RNAD Caol Farm	Inverness-shire	Scotland		Closed	(sub depot of RNAD Fort William)
— RNAD Corpach	Inverness-shire	Scotland		Closed	(sub depot of RNAD Fort William)
— RNAD Lochailort	Inverness-shire	Scotland		Closed	(sub depot of RNAD Fort William)
— RNAD Locheilside	Inverness-shire	Scotland		Closed	(sub depot of RNAD Fort William)
RNAD Gosport	Hampshire	England	1977–	Operational as DM Gosport	The collective name for the Gosport depots was changed in 1977 from RNAD Priddy's Hard to RNAD Gosport in anticipation of the closure of Priddy's Hard itself.
— RNAD Bedenham	Hampshire	England	1910–	Operational as part of DM Gosport	(formerly sub-depot of RNAD Priddy's Hard)
— RNAD Elson	Hampshire	England	1925–	Operational as part of DM Gosport	(formerly sub-depot of RNAD Priddy's Hard) initially a magazine depot; guided missile depot since 1964.
— RNAD Frater	Hampshire	England	1918–	Operational as part of DM Gosport	(formerly sub-depot of RNAD Priddy's Hard) a Mining Depot (RNMD) until 1959, then a torpedo depot.
— RNAD Priddy's Hard	Hampshire	England	1777–1988	Closed	(latterly sub-depot of RNAD Gosport); site now used for housing and Explosion! Museum of Naval Firepower
RNAD Grain	Kent	England	1941–1961	Closed	
RNAD Haulbowline	Cork	Republic of Ireland	1806–1923	Closed	Now the headquarters of the Irish Naval Service.
RNAD Invergordon	Ross-shire	Scotland	1916–	Closed	
RNAD Marchwood	Hampshire	England	1811–1961	Closed	
RNAD Portsmouth (gunwharf)	Hampshire	England	1715–1923	Closed	
RNAD Plymouth (gunwharf)	Devon	England	1891–	Closed	Also known as RNAD Stonehouse
RNAD Trecwn	Pembrokeshire	Wales	1938–1998	Closed	Underground magazine facility (initially a mine depot)
RNAD Upton	Kent	England		Closed	
RNAD Upnor	Kent	England	1668–1961	Closed	Lower Upnor Ordnance Depot remained in MOD hands until 2013
— RNAD Chattenden	Kent	England	1875–1961	Closed	(formerly sub-depot of RNAD Upnor) later became part of Royal School of Military Engineering; site disused from 1995, for sale in 2016.
— RNAD Lodge Hill	Kent	England	1898–1961	Closed	(formerly sub-depot of RNAD Upnor) Later Defence Explosive Ordnance Disposal, Munitions and Search School (DEMSS South); closed 2011. For sale 2016.
RNAD Woolwich	London	England	1671–1958	Closed	Part of the Royal Arsenal
RNCF Holton Heath	Dorset	England	1914–1959	Closed	Cordite Factory
RNGF Westhoughton	Lancashire	England	1916–1919	Closed	Gun Factory
RNMD Dalmore	Ross-shire	Scotland	1918–	Closed	Mining Depot
RNMD Dover	Kent	England	1918–	Closed	
RNMD Immingham	Lincolnshire	England	1917–	Closed	Mining Depot
RNMD Milford Haven	Pembrokeshire	Wales	1935–1989	Closed	Underground magazine facility (Mining Depot)
RNMD Wrabness	Essex	England	1921–1963	Closed	Mining Depot (The site, sold in 1992, is now Wrabness Nature Reserve).
RNPF Caerwent	Monmouthshire	Wales	1940–1968	Closed	Propellant Factory
RNTD Chatham	Kent	England	c.1886–1958	Closed	Torpedo Depot within H.M. Dockyard
RNTD Devonport	Devon	England	c.1886–1959	Closed	Torpedo Depot within H.M. Dockyard
RNTD Granton	Midlothian	Scotland	1917–	Closed	Torpedo Depot
RNTD Harwich	Essex	England	1916–	Closed	Torpedo Depot
RNTD Port Edgar	West Lothian	Scotland	1917–	Closed	Torpedo Depot
RNTD Portsmouth	Hampshire	England	1886–1959	Closed	Torpedo Depot within H.M. Dockyard (transferred to RNAD Frater in 1959).
RNTD Rosyth	Fife	Scotland	1918–	Closed	Torpedo Depot within H.M. Dockyard
RNTD Weymouth	Dorset	England	1902–1959	Closed	Torpedo Depot
RNTF Alexandria	Dunbartonshire	Scotland	1935–1970	Closed	Torpedo Factory
RNTF Greenock	Renfrewshire	Scotland	1910–1951	Closed	Torpedo Factory (Torpedo Experimental Establishment remained on site until 1959)

=== Overseas ===
Name	City or district	Country	Years active	Status	Notes
RNAD Alexandria	Alexandria	Egypt		Closed	
RNAD Benghaisa		Malta		Closed	
RNAD Bombay	Mumbai	India		Closed	
RNAD Butcher Island	Mumbai	India		Closed	
RNAD Colombo	Colombo	Sri Lanka		Closed	
RNAD Corradino	Paola	Malta	1893–	Closed	Underground magazine complex
RNAD Gibraltar	Gibraltar	Gibraltar	1905–	Closed	Underground magazine depot
RNAD Haifa	Haifa	Israel		Closed	
RNAD Hong Kong	Hong Kong	Hong Kong SAR		Closed	
RNAD Mombasa	Mombasa	Kenya		Closed	
RNAD Port Said	Port Said	Egypt		Closed	
RNAD Spectacle Island	Sydney	Australia	1884–1913	Closed	Established by the government of New South Wales in 1865; in Royal Navy ownership 1884–1913, then transferred to the Royal Australian Navy, which still uses the site as a Naval repository.
RNAD Simon's Town	Western Cape	South Africa		Closed	
RNAD Singapore	Singapore	Singapore		Closed	
RNAD Trincomalee	Trincomalee	Sri Lanka		Closed	
RNTD Gibraltar	Gibraltar	Gibraltar		Closed	Torpedo Depot
RNTD Hong Kong	Hong Kong	Hong Kong SAR		Closed	Torpedo Depot
RNTD Kalafrana		Malta		Closed	Torpedo Depot
RNTD Msida		Malta		Closed	Torpedo Depot
RNAD HMS St. Angelo		Malta		Closed	31 March 1979 https://heritagemalta.mt/explore/fort-st-angelo/

== See also ==
- Ordnance Board
- RAF munitions storage during WWII
- Royal Naval Supply and Transport Service
