= HMS Arethusa (1849) =

Frigate of the Royal Navy

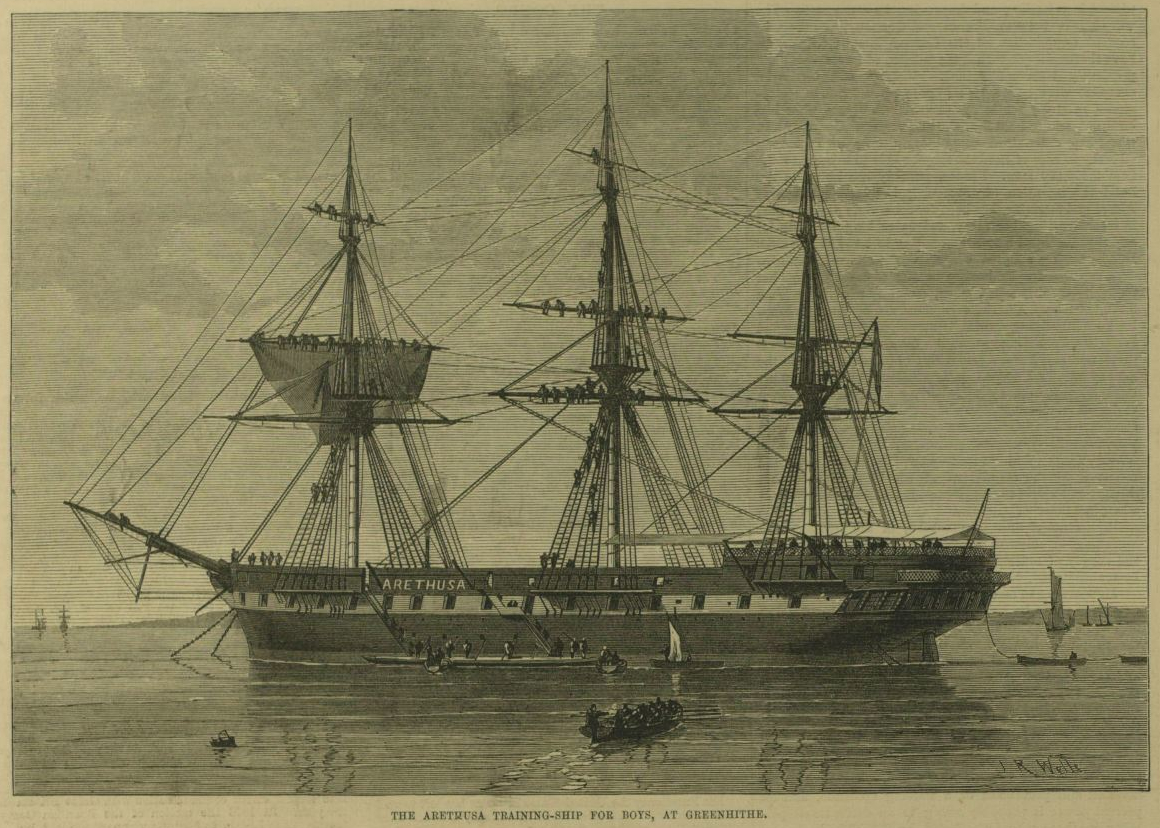
- The Arethusa Training-Ship for Boys, at Greenhithe, 1875

History

United Kingdom
- Name: HMS Arethusa
- Ordered: 19 February 1844
- Builder: Pembroke Dockyard
- Laid down: 30 March 1846
- Launched: 20 June 1849
- Completed: 20 March 1850
- Reclassified: Training ship in 1874
- Fate: Sold on 2 August 1933; Broken up in 1934

General characteristics as sailing frigate
- Class & type: Constance-class frigate
- Tons burthen: 2,125 75/94 bm
- Length: 180 ft (55 m) (gundeck); 146 ft 10.25 in (44.76 m) (keel)
- Beam: 52 ft 8 in (16.05 m)
- Depth of hold: 16 ft 3 in (4.95 m)
- Sail plan: Full-rigged ship
- Crew: 500
- Armament: Upper deck: 28 × 32-pounders (10 × 32-pounders later replaced by 10 × 8in/68-pounder shell guns); Quarterdeck: 14 × 32-pounders; Forecastle: 8 × 32-pounders

General characteristics as screw frigate
- Displacement: 3,708 tons
- Tons burthen: 3,142 33/94 bm
- Length: 252 ft 4 in (76.91 m) (gundeck); 217 ft 1 in (66.17 m) (keel)
- Beam: 52 ft 8 in (16.05 m)
- Draught: 20 ft 8 in (6.30 m) (forward); 23 ft 6 in (7.16 m) (aft)
- Depth of hold: 17 ft 1 in (5.21 m)
- Installed power: 3,165 ihp (2,360 kW)
- Propulsion: Trunked engine, with surface condensers; Cylinders 80in diam.; 42in stroke
- Sail plan: Full-rigged ship
- Speed: 11.704 knots (21.68 km/h; 13.47 mph)
- Crew: 525
- Armament: Middle deck: 30 × 8in shell; Upper deck: 20 × 32-pounders + 1 × 68-pounder on pivot

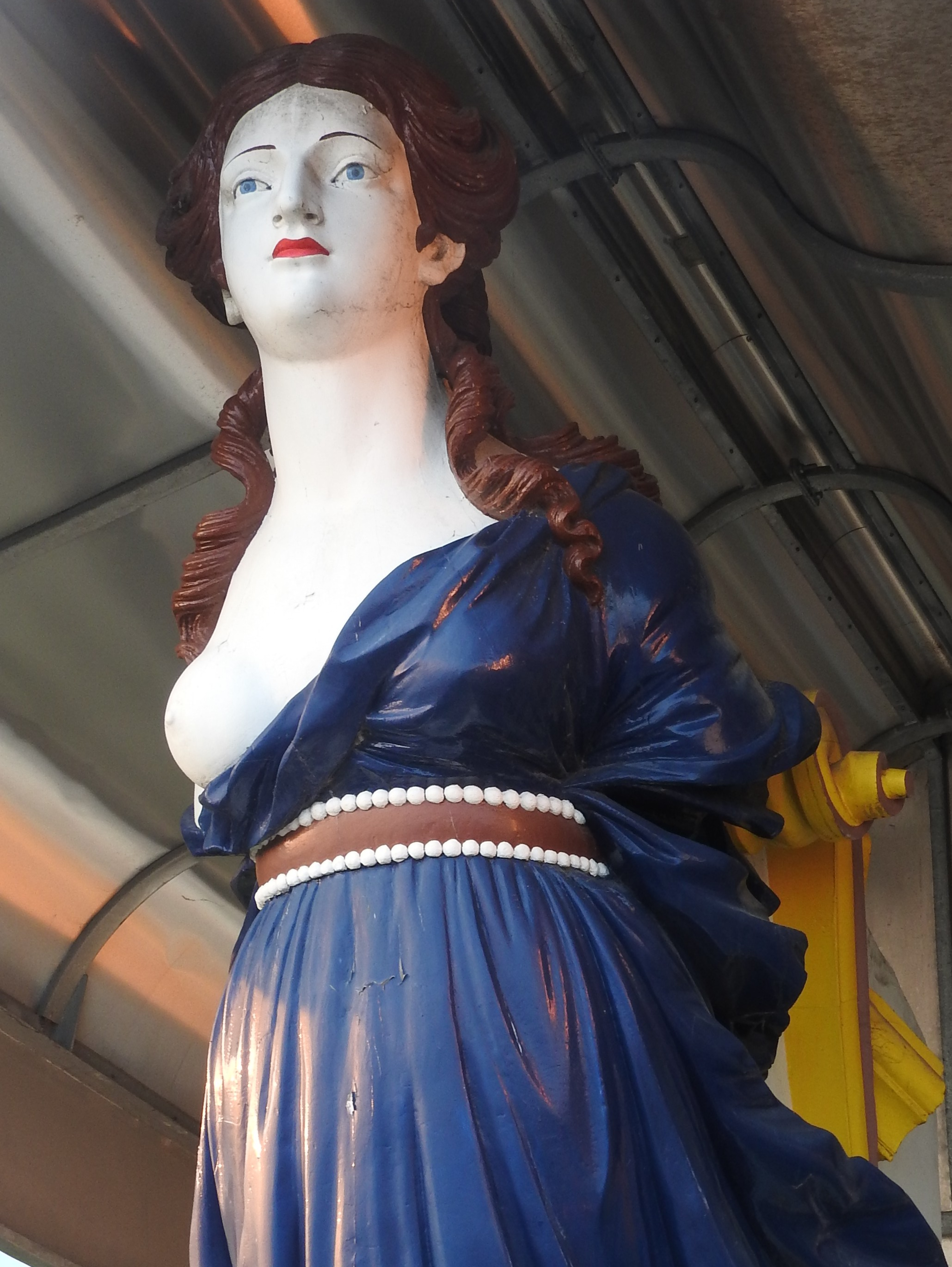
Preserved Arethusa figurehead in Upnor on the River Medway

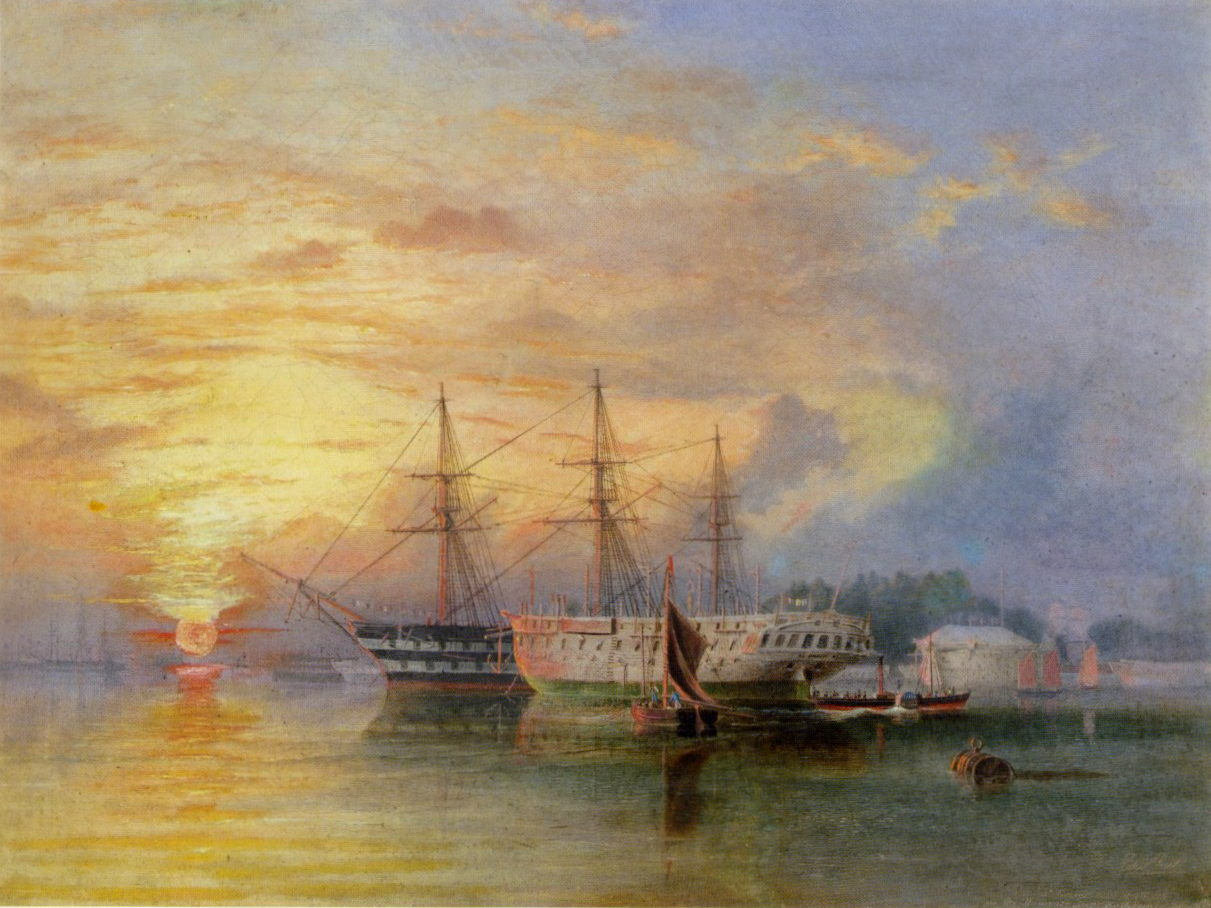
HMS St George and Arethusa on the Hamoaze near Bull Point in 1860, by Edward Snell (engineer)

HMS Arethusa was a 50-gun fourth-rate sailing frigate of the Royal Navy launched in 1849 from the Pembroke Dockyard. The fourth naval ship to bear the name, she served in the Crimean War and then in 1861 was converted to a steam screw frigate. Decommissioned in 1874, Arethusa became a school and training ship on the River Thames, preparing young boys for maritime careers, until she was broken up in 1934.

== Construction ==
HMS Arethusa was ordered in 1844 from the Pembroke Dockyard as a repeat of the frigate HMS Constance and was launched on 26 June 1849. She had a tonnage of 2,132 and was designed with a V-shaped hull by Sir William Symonds. She was of all-wooden construction.

== Naval service ==
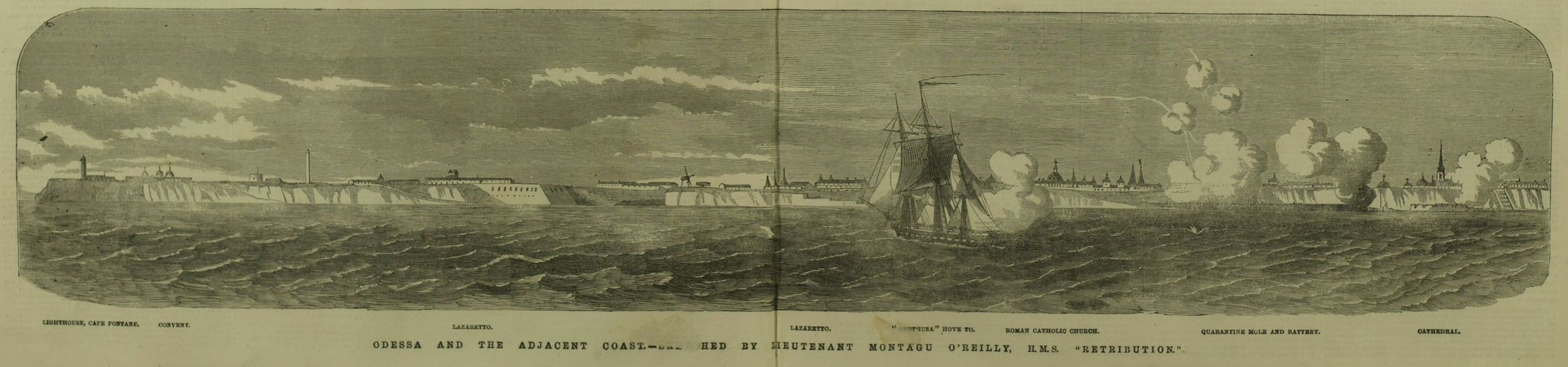
Arethusa at the Bombardment of Odessa by the English and French Steam Squadron in 1854

Arethusa saw service during the Crimean War, On 29 October 1853, she ran aground in the Dardanelles. She was refloated the next day after her guns had been removed to lighten her. Arethusa took part in battles at Odessa and Sevastopol. At the time of the battle in 1854 she was captained by William Robert Mends and was the last major ship of the Royal Navy to enter an engagement under sail power alone.

In 1860-1861 Arethusa was lengthened and converted to screw propulsion at Chatham Dockyard, with a steam trunk engine made by John Penn and Sons, London.

== Training ship ==
Once decommissioned, in 1874, the ship's engines were removed and she was loaned by the Admiralty to the charity that later became known as Shaftesbury Homes and Arethusa. Retaining the name Arethusa, she was moored next to their existing training ship Chichester at Greenhithe, Kent. Shaftesbury Homes provided refuge and taught maritime skills to destitute young boys who had been sleeping rough on the streets of London and trained them for a career in the Royal Navy or Merchant Navy.

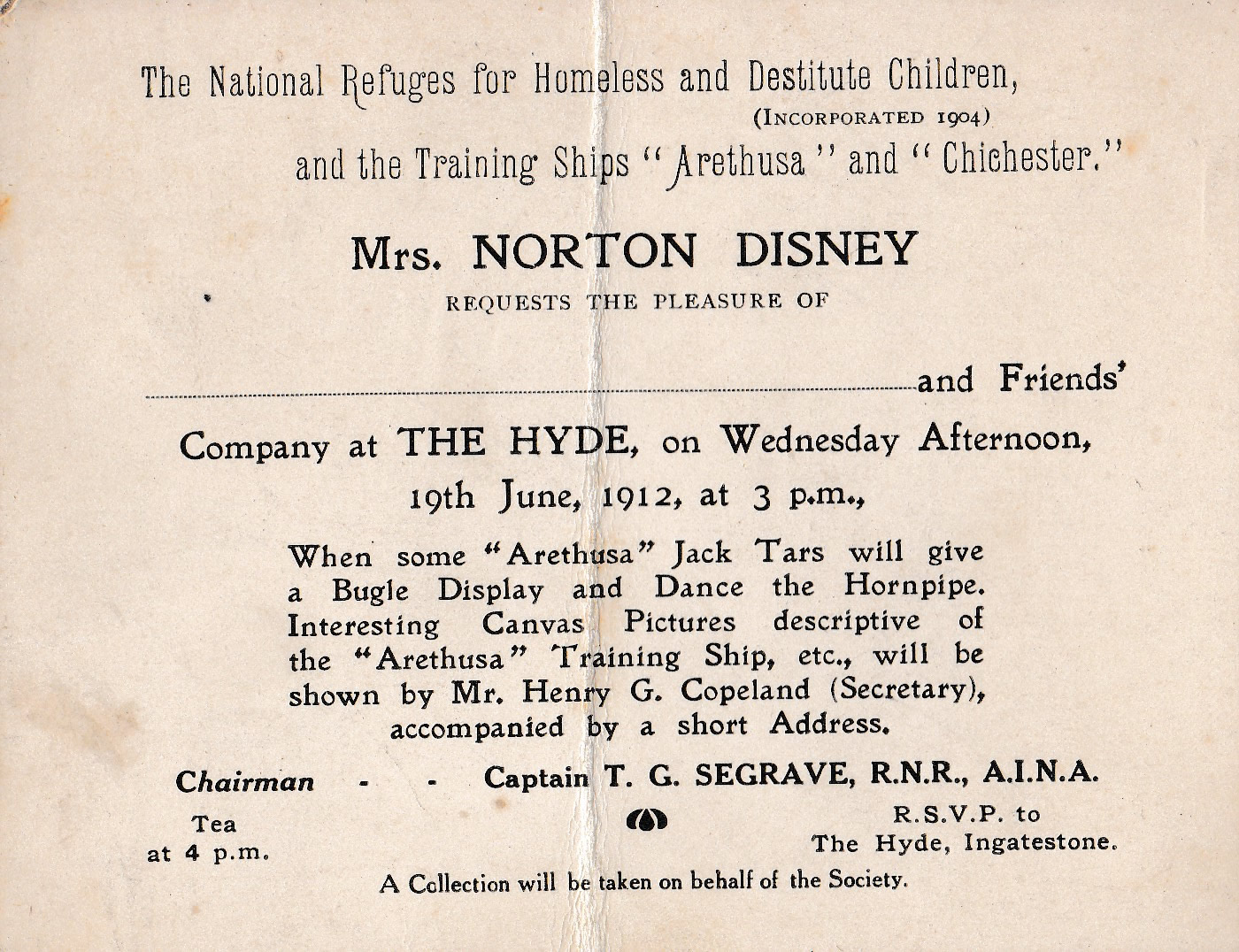
An invite from Mrs Norton Disney to watch trainees from the Arethusa and learn about the training ship

In 1933 the wooden frigate was no longer viable, and was replaced by the steel-hulled ship Peking, which was moored at Upnor on the Medway, and renamed Arethusa. The frigate returned to the Admiralty, was sold to Castle's Shipbreakers on 2 August 1933 and demolished at Charlton, London in the following year. The frigate's figurehead, originally carved by the Hellyer family, was retained by the school and displayed onshore at Upnor, where it remains after restoration in 2013.
