= German Port Museum =

Museum in Hamburg, Germany

Coordinates: 53°31′30″N 9°59′57″E

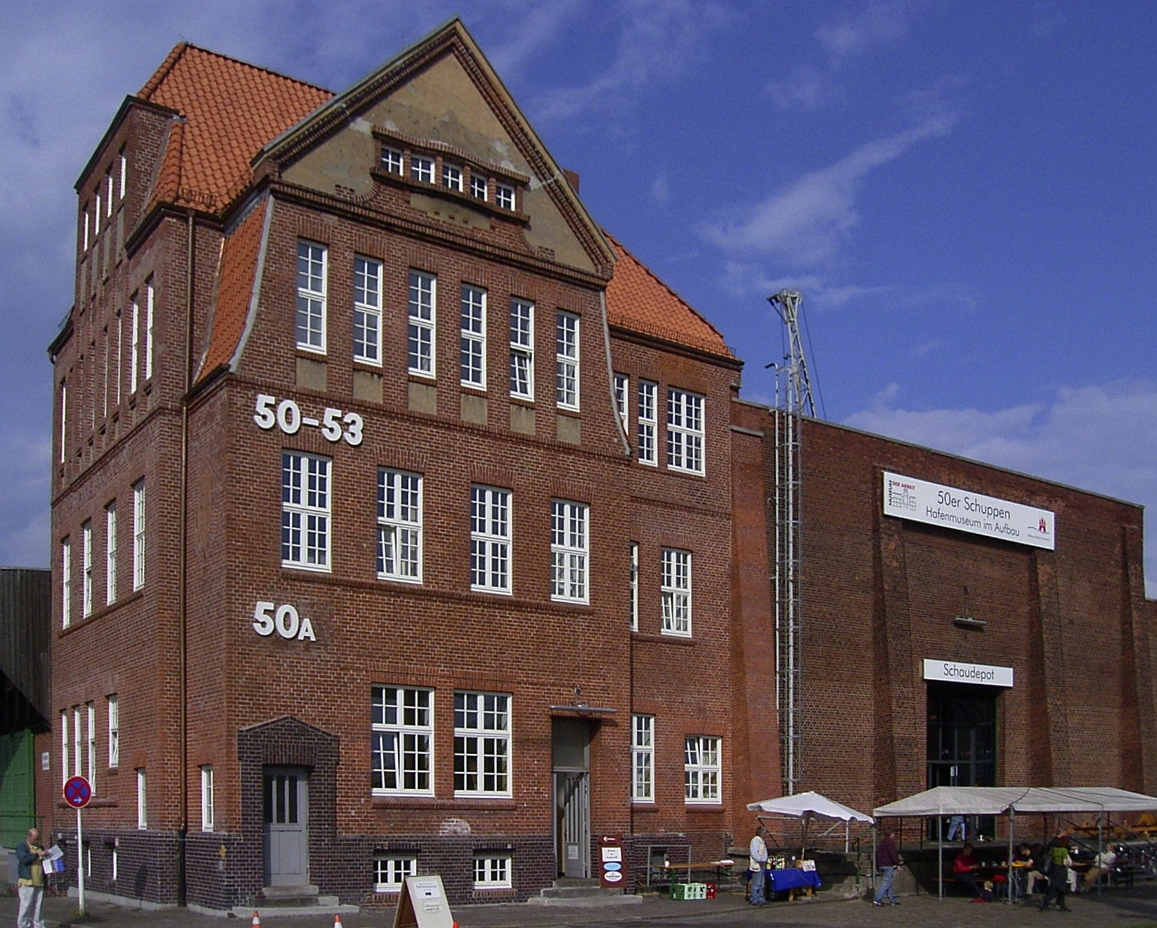
Pier 52 Museum

The German Port Museum (Deutsches Hafenmuseum) is a nautical museum in Hamburg. The German Federal Parliament's budget committee approved initial funding of €94 million to rebuild it.

== Scope ==
The museum displays the commercial and economic history of Germany's largest port, and wider issues of worldwide trade.

== Building Concept ==
The Peking and a Hadag ferry are already important elements, which are connected to the museum, among other old vehicles.
