= Chattenden Woods and Lodge Hill =

Protected area in Kent, England

Coordinates: 51.432°N 0.525°E

- Site of Special Scientific Interest
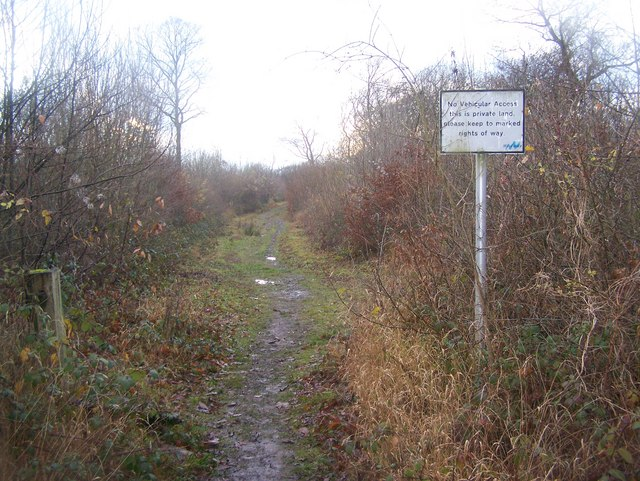
- Location of Chattenden Woods and Lodge Hill.
- Area of search: Kent
- Grid reference: TQ 756 734
- Interest: Biological
- Area: 351.0 hectares (867 acres)
- Notification date: 2013
- Location map: Magic Map

Chattenden Woods and Lodge Hill is a 351-hectare (870-acre) biological Site of Special Scientific Interest north of Rochester in Kent.

This site has diverse habitats, including ancient semi-natural woodland, grassland and scrub. There are nationally important numbers of nightingales in the woodland and scrub during the breeding season, and invertebrates include nationally scarce moths.

Public footpaths go through the woods.
