= Chattenden =

Village in Kent, England

Coordinates: 51°25′08″N 0°31′37″E

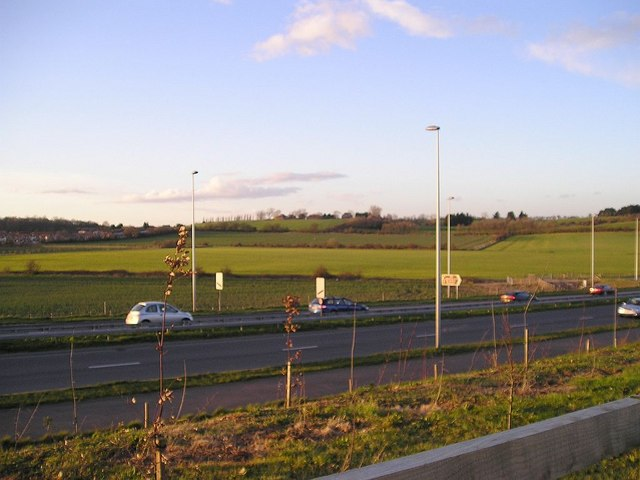
- View of Chattenden from the A228

- Location within Kent
- OS grid reference: TQ758722
- Civil parish: Hoo St Werburgh
- Unitary authority: Medway
- Ceremonial county: Kent
- Region: South East
- Country: England
- Sovereign state: United Kingdom
- Post town: ROCHESTER
- Postcode district: ME3
- Dialling code: 01634
- Police: Kent
- Fire: Kent
- Ambulance: South East Coast
- UK Parliament: Rochester and Strood

Chattenden is a village within the civil parish of Hoo, which is within the unitary authority of Medway, Kent, England. It was, until 1 April 1998, part of Kent and is still ceremonially associated via the Lieutenancies Act. The A228 goes through the village.

== Etymology ==
The first datable attestation of the name Chattenden is in October 1281, as Chattindone, alongside other early spellings such as Chetindunam, Chatendune, and Chetyndone. Scholars agree that the final syllable comes from the Old English word dūn ("hill"), but the origin of the rest of the name is debated. A personal name, *Ceatta, followed by the Old English place-name-forming suffix -ing, has been suggested, in which case the name meant "hill at Ceatta's place". Since the people of nearby Chatham were known as the Cēthǣmas, *Cēthǣmadūn ("the hill of the people of Chatham") is possible.

However 21st-century scholars have tended to think that the initial element of the word (as in Chatham itself) is the Common Brittonic word whose modern Welsh reflex is coed ("woodland"), referring to Great Chattenden Wood, followed by Old English ing. This wood-name may also be attested in the names of Upchat Road and Lochat Road. If so, the Old English name meant "hill at [the place called] Chat."

== Geography and ecology ==
Turning left on the A228 on the brow of Four Elms Hill leads onto Kitchener Road, that eventually leads itself to Chattenden Woods and Lodge Hill, designated as an SSSI, due to the diversity of insects, birds, plants and trees found there. To the south of Chattenden is Towerhill Wood, also known as Coxham Wood, with has public footpaths that lead into Lower Upnor, where the Arethusa Venture Centre and the Medway Yacht Club are located.

Along the A228, which becomes the Ratcliffe Highway in Chattenden, was once a public house known as 'The Old George' that was located next to the Jet petrol station. The Old George was constructed from 15 February to 12 November 1847. The Chattenden Recreation Ground that was located adjacent to Elm Avenue had an Armada Beacon erected next to the Pavilion for the Fire Over England Festival and Armada Day 1988, which was also called the Armada 400. It was celebrated in the United Kingdom from 17 to 21 October 1988. The recreation ground is now a housing estate.

== Military history ==
The Royal Navy built an Ordnance Depot along Beacon Hill Lane, near to Four Elms Hill, which stored gunpowder and other supplies near to the Royal Naval Barracks. Additionally, the Royal Navy installed a British Military narrow-gauge railway, anti-aircraft gun batteries, and a shell store. Construction of the Ordnance Depot began in October 1872 and was completed in December 1872. The various clerical and residential buildings of the Royal Naval Barracks next to Beacon Hill Lane were built from April 1875 to June 1875, and the War Office also built five magazines on a hillside overlooking the River Medway at Chattenden during the same months in 1875. This facility expanded and a nearby site at Lodge Hill was established in 1899.

From August 1940 to September 1940, the War Office built a Royal Navy Wireless Station adjacent to Beacon Hill Lane and a concrete Blockhouse or Pillbox was built on an artificially constructed mound at the top end of Beacon Hill Lane, which also functioned as an observation platform near to the River Medway. Most of the designated sites, which became known as Chattenden and Lodge Hill Military Camps, were put up for sale in March 2016 by Homes England, which is part of the Ministry of Housing, Communities and Local Government. However, the land on both sides of Beacon Hill Lane is still owned by the Ministry of Defence (United Kingdom).

== See also ==
- Chattenden and Upnor Railway

== Sources ==
- Heritage, English; Saunders, A. D. (1 January 1985). Upnor Castle: Kent. English Heritage. ISBN 978-1-85074-039-1.
