= Wheelbarrow (robot) =

Bomb disposal robot

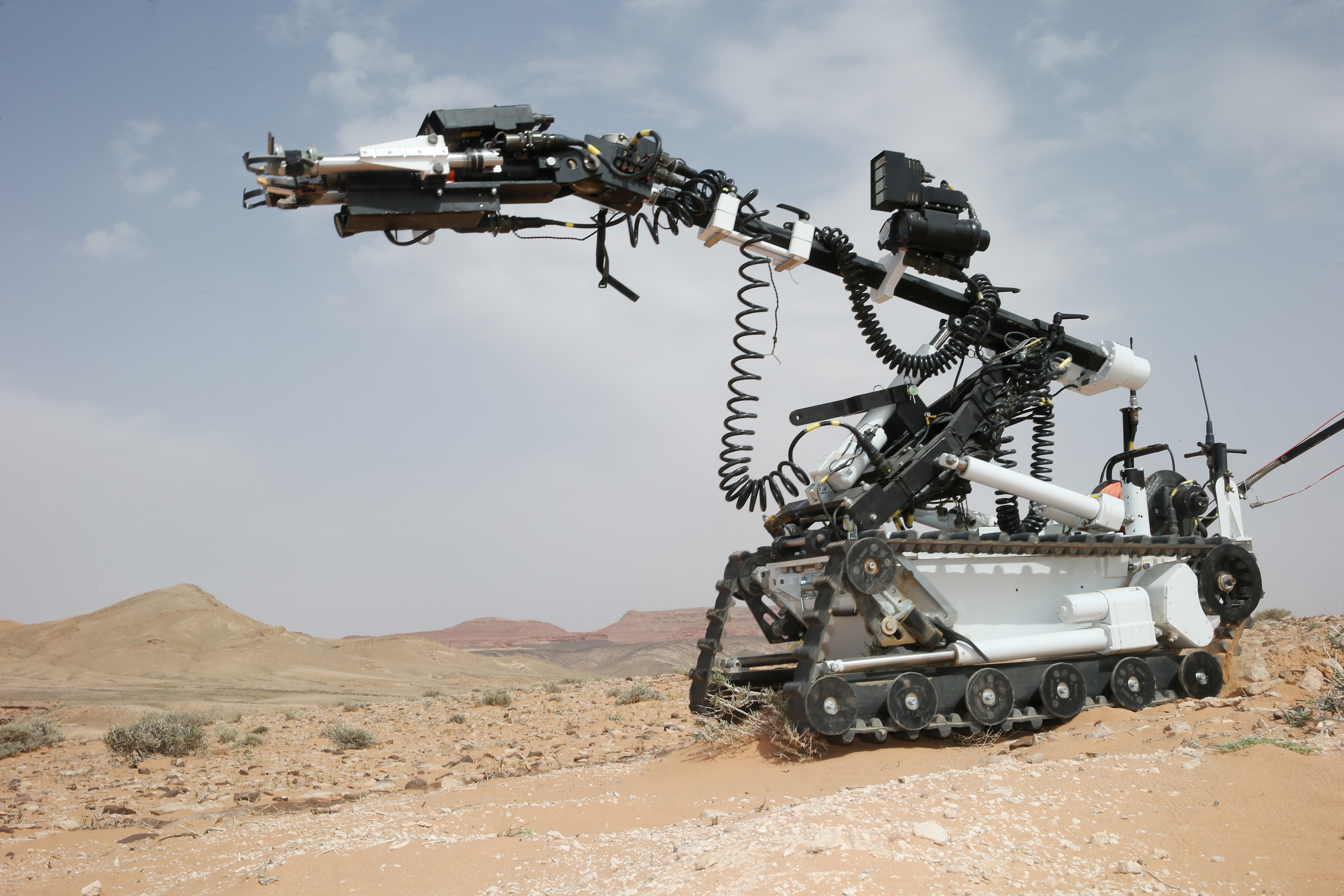
Wheelbarrow Mk 8a

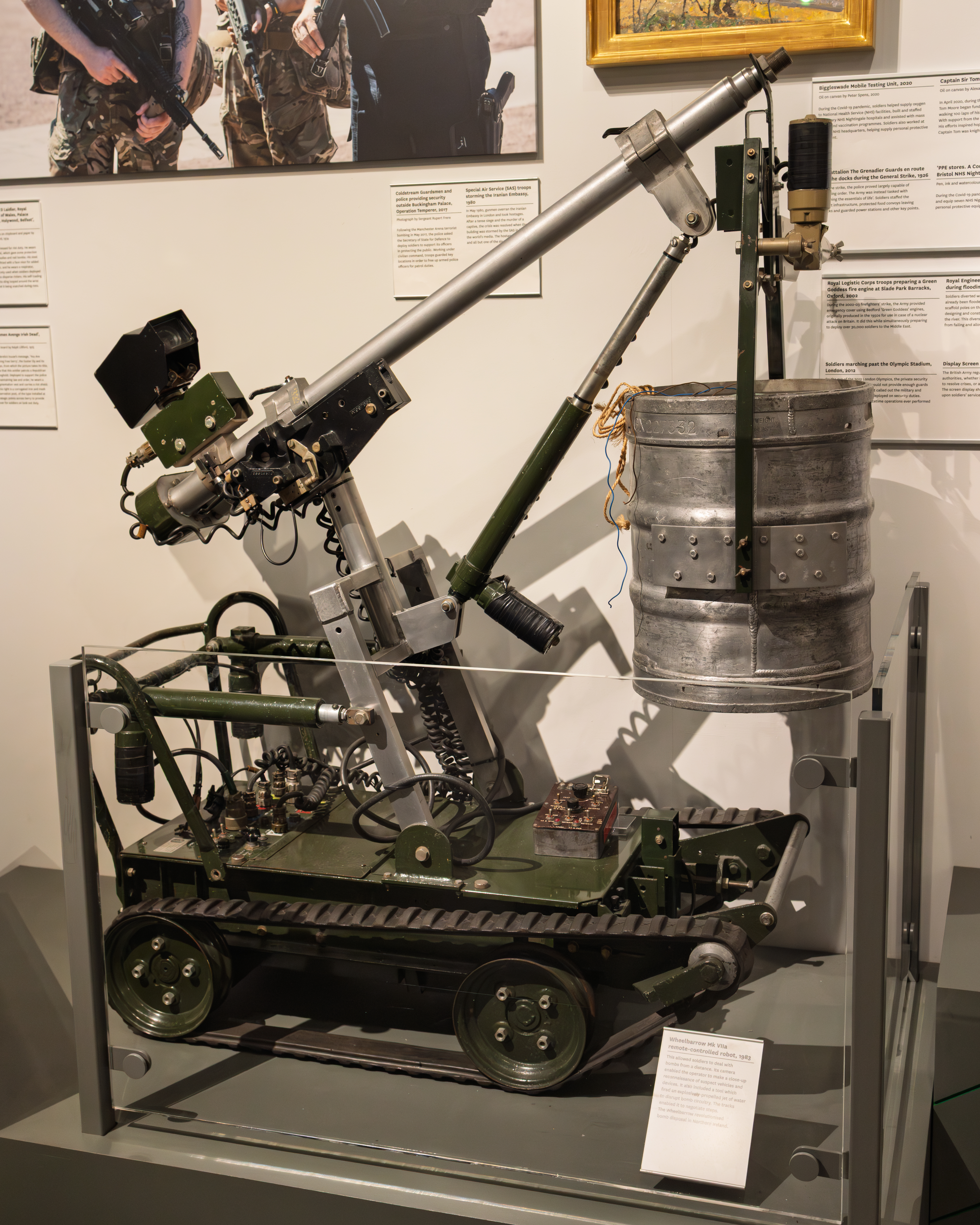
Wheelbarrow Mk 7a from 1983

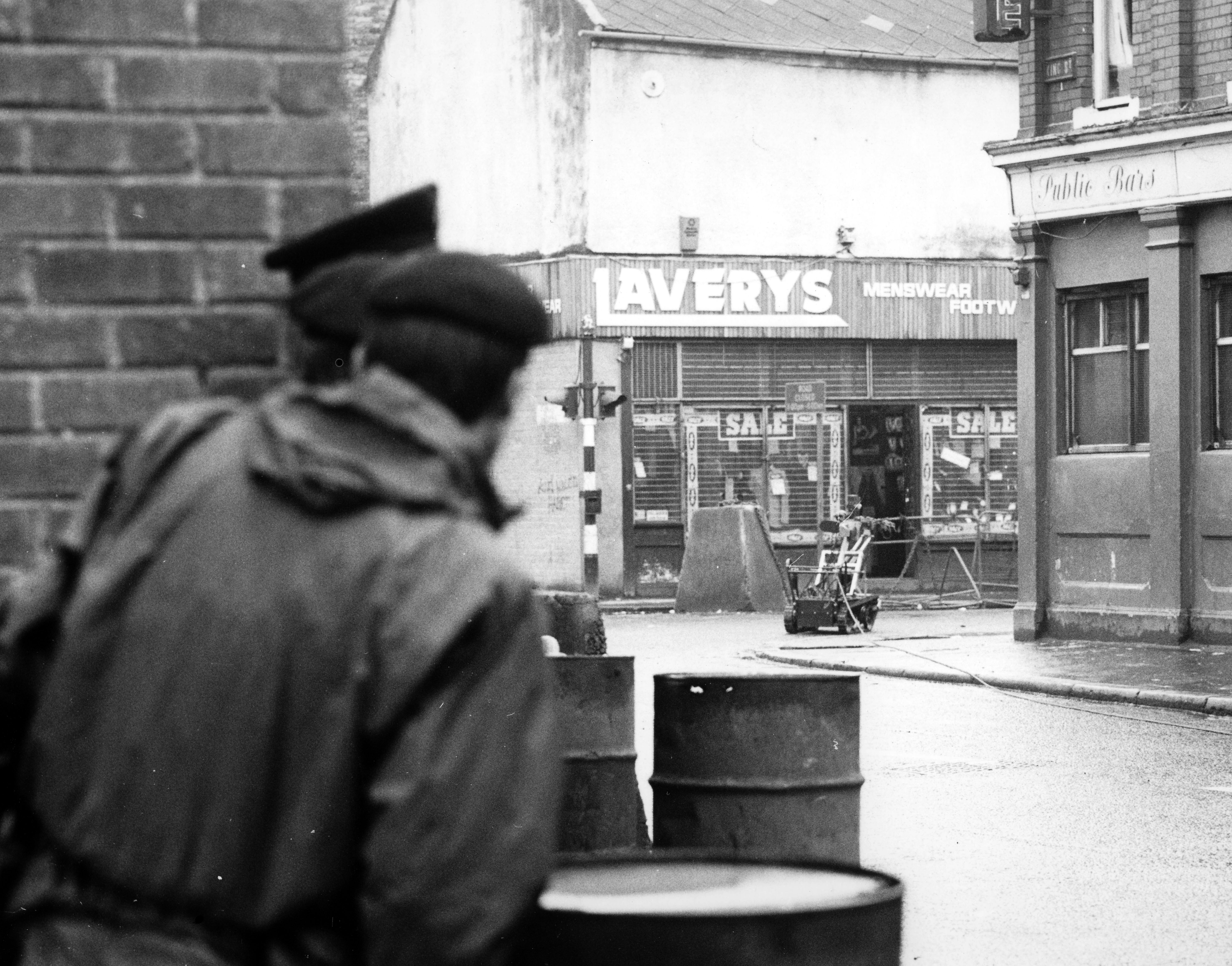
The wheelbarrow in use on the streets of Northern Ireland, 1978

The Wheelbarrow is a remotely controlled robot designed in 1972 for use by British Army bomb disposal teams operating in Northern Ireland (321 EOD), mainland Britain (11 EOD Regiment), and Iraq. Over 400 have been destroyed in operation, possibly saving the equivalent number of lives of their human counterparts.

The Wheelbarrow was withdrawn from British Army service in 2019, and replaced by the L3Harris T7 UGV.

== Design and development ==
Lieutenant-Colonel Peter Miller, a retired British Army officer from the Royal Tank Regiment, invented the Wheelbarrow robot in 1972. At the time, he was a Trials Design officer at the Military Vehicles and Engineering Establishment (MVEE, Chertsey) but initially worked largely on his own initiative. His invention revolutionized bomb disposal operations, particularly during the Troubles in Northern Ireland. It was initially conceived as a remotely controlled device based on an electrically powered wheelbarrow chassis, allowing operators to handle explosive devices without direct human exposure.

The device's impact is most evident in its role during the height of the IRA bombing campaign in the 1970s, where it was credited with saving hundreds of lives by enabling remote disruption, defusing, or disposal of bombs, including car bombs and improvised explosive devices (IEDs). By providing a remote platform for devices like the Pigstick, which fires a jet of water to disrupt the circuitry of an IED with a low risk of detonation, the Wheelbarrow shifted tactics from manual defusing (often called the "long walk") to safer, remote interventions. These markedly decreased deaths among Ammunition Technical Officers (ATOs) and boosted the British Army's counter-insurgency effectiveness. It was described as a "game changer" in the conflict, contributing to fewer ATO fatalities and higher success rates against IRA explosives.

Over its service life, more than 400 Wheelbarrow units were destroyed in action, with each destruction estimated to save at least one life, as the robots took the brunt of explosions that would otherwise have targeted human operators.

Beyond Northern Ireland, the Wheelbarrow saw deployment in mainland Britain, Iraq, and other conflict zones, influencing global bomb disposal practices and saving innumerable lives worldwide. Its evolution led to advanced variants, such as those produced by Northrop Grumman, which incorporated improved maneuverability, sensors for chemical/biological/radiological/nuclear threats, and enhanced dexterity for handling objects. The British Army used it until 2019, when it was replaced by the L3Harris T7 unmanned ground vehicle (UGV), but its legacy persists in modern remotely operated vehicles (ROVs) that continue to protect EOD teams in asymmetric warfare and civilian threats.

Overall, the Wheelbarrow's introduction marked a pivotal advancement in robotics for warfare and security, setting the standard for subsequent bomb-disposal technologies and demonstrating how such innovations can drastically reduce the human cost of explosive threats.
