= FBI Hazardous Devices School =

US bomb technician training center

The FBI Hazardous Devices School is a training center that trains all of the United States public safety bomb technicians at the federal, state and local level. It is part of the FBI's Critical Incident Response Group.

The school is located on a 455-acre campus at Redstone Arsenal in Huntsville, Alabama. The campus contains classrooms, explosive ranges, and mock villages that include a train station, apartment complexes, a movie theater, and a strip mall.

The school opened in 1971, and was jointly run by the FBI and the United States Army for 45 years until 2016, when the FBI took primary responsibility.
