= Bomb suit =

Specialized body armor for protection from explosions

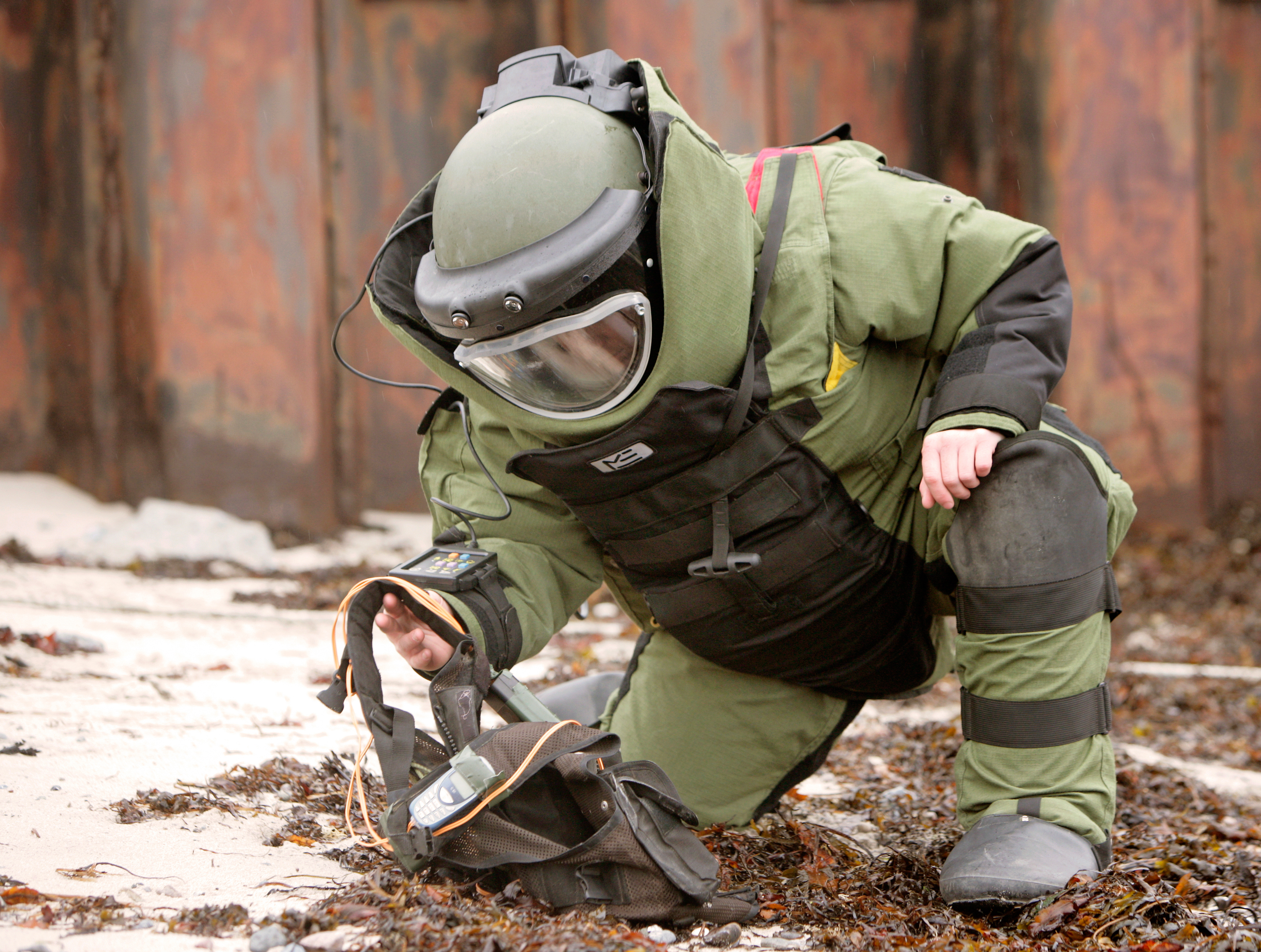
An EOD technician wearing a bomb suit

A bomb suit, explosive ordnance disposal (EOD) suit or a blast suit is a heavy suit of body armor designed to withstand the pressure generated by a bomb and any fragments the bomb may produce. It is usually worn by trained personnel attempting bomb disposal. In contrast to ballistic body armors, which usually focus on protecting the torso and head, a bomb suit must protect all parts of the body, since the dangers posed by a bomb's explosion affect the entire body.

Parts of the bomb suit overlap for maximum protection. The suit protects in several different ways. It deflects or stops projectiles that may come from an exploded device. It also stops or greatly decreases the pressure of the blast wave being transmitted to the person inside of the suit. Most bomb suits, such as the Advanced Bomb Suit, use layers of Kevlar, foam, and plastic to accomplish these functions.

In order to maximize protection, bomb suits come with a pair of interchangeable gloves and wrist guard attachments. This gives the wearer's hands mobility and protection needed for the task and avoid cross contamination of any evidence found (e.g., fingerprints).

EOD technicians wear bomb suits during reconnaissance, "render safe" or disruption procedures on potential or confirmed explosive threats. Such suits must provide a tremendous degree of protection from fragmentation, blast overpressure, thermal and tertiary effects should the threat device detonate. At the same time, the suit can significantly hinder their mobility or situational awareness.

== History ==
Modern day EOD units had their beginnings in World War II, when the German Luftwaffe greatly increased the number of bombs dropped on British soil. As the number of civilian casualties grew due to delayed explosion of bombs, which had often penetrated several feet into the ground after being dropped from planes, men were trained to defuse the unexploded devices and groups were dedicated to try to keep up with that task. As fuse designs changed, many of these early UXD (unexploded device) soldiers died until more successful means to defeat a new design were developed.

As the United States saw its likely involvement in World War II, they requested help from the British to train a civilian EOD force that could defuse unexploded bombs in urban areas. The human cost of learning the variety of fuses and how to defeat them was lower for the U.S. due to this education. After it became clear that EOD tasks were best handled by the military, the U.S. tried several ways to organize EOD personnel that would allow for the need for both specialized training and diverse deployment.

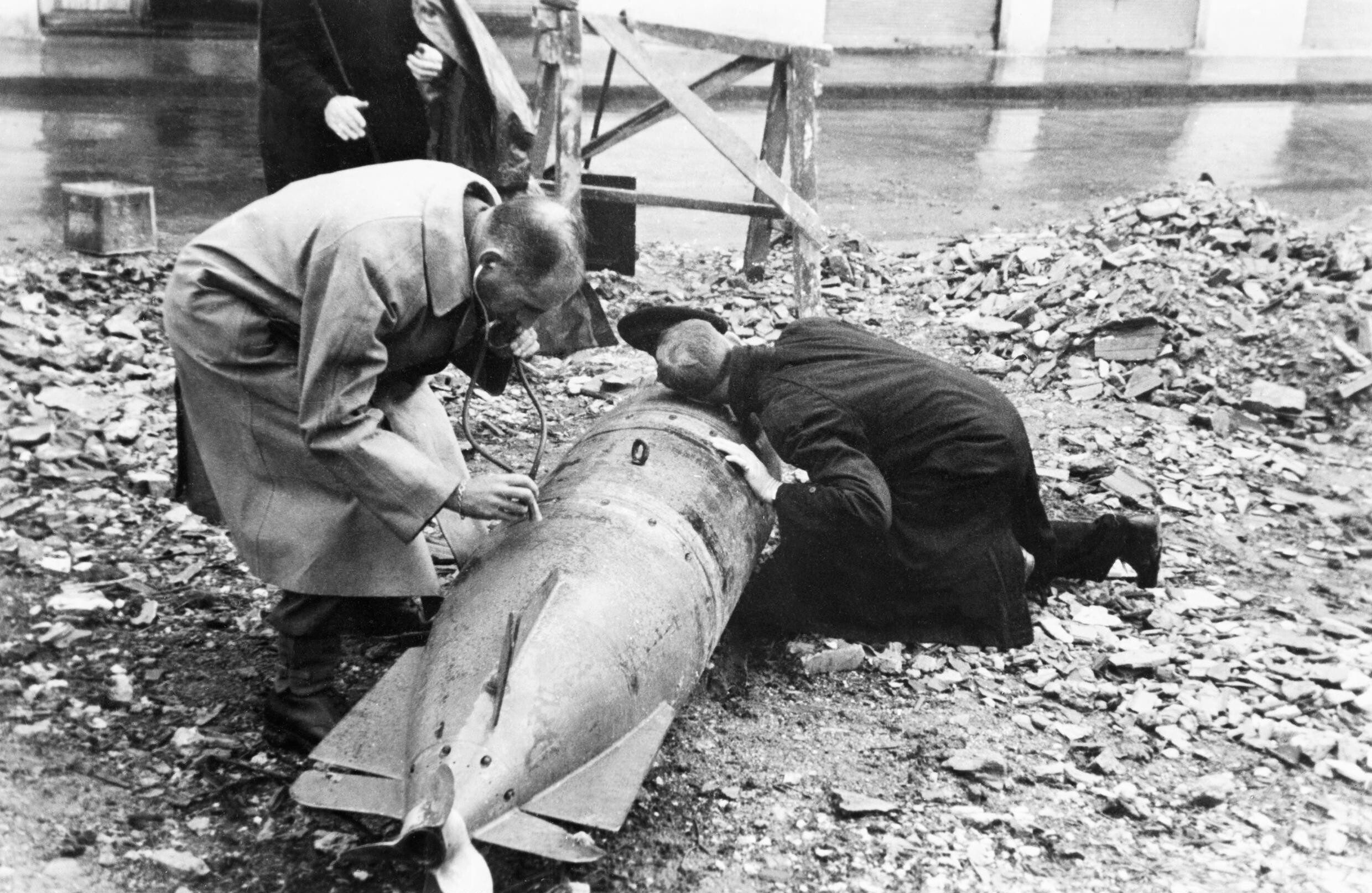
An unprotected bomb disposal party working on an enemy weapon dropped near Algiers, November 1942

In photos of early missions to defuse unexploded bombs, the men are not wearing any protective gear. In fact, they are often shirtless to cope with the heat generated by the manual labor of digging around the devices before they could be defused. Basically, the individual defusing the bomb succeeded or died.

The first EOD suits consisted of Kevlar type material and/or armor plates made of metal or fiber-reinforced plastic. Their purpose was to protect the wearer from penetrating injuries by fragments from an exploding device. In the mid-1990s, research showed that these materials alone were not effective against the blast wave itself, which can cause blast lung and other potentially deadly internal injuries. Modern EOD suits have layers of Kevlar, plating, and foam to provide protection from both fragments and the blast wave itself.

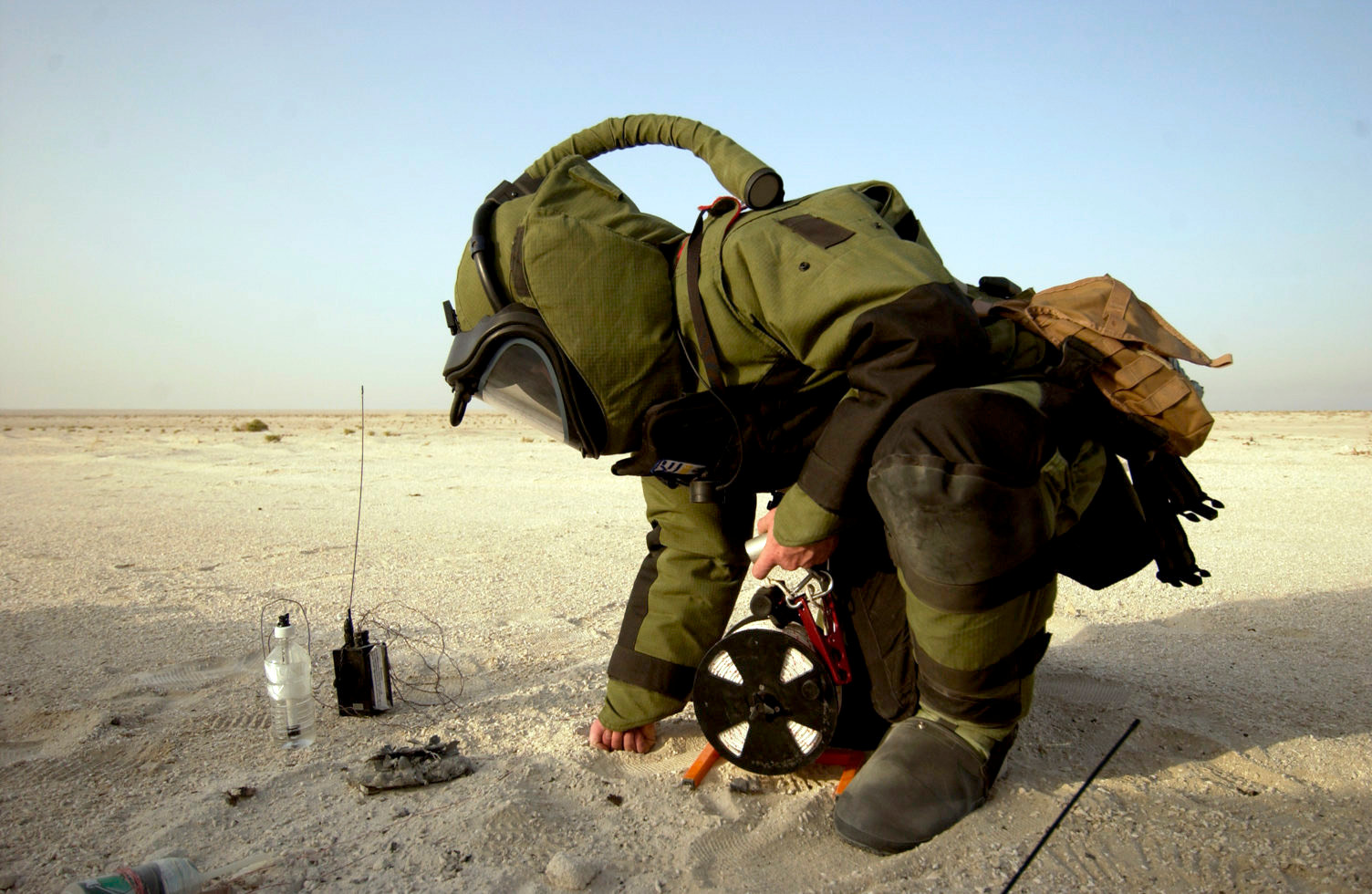
A bomb suit with self-contained breathing apparatus

The threats posed by an improvised explosive device, commonly known as an IED, can also include chemical or biological agents. This has led to significant advancements since 1999 in the design of bomb disposal suits and helmets. For example, a modern bomb suit may address both conventional blast threats and chemical/biological agents by incorporating a chemical protective undergarment and a helmet compatible with a self-contained breathing apparatus (SCBA).

In 2006, the U.S. National Institute of Justice supported a program to develop a national testing standard for EOD suits so that the protection afforded by a given suit can be described in a standard way. The goal was to have a means to compare the performance of different designs with each other and with expected threats, similar to the NIJ standards that are widely used to test and compare body armor or materials used to stop ballistic threats.

Bomb disposal truck demonstration in Tokyo and a man in a bomb suit getting inside, 2016

Developers must consider more than just protection, since a person must work on a stressful task that also requires fine motor skills while wearing a bomb suit. Other factors that must be considered include

- cushioning the spine and head in case the wearer is knocked over by a blast
- thermal heat protection
- freedom of motion to work efficiently
- maximum weight restrictions
- rapid removal, such as for emergency medical treatment
- defogger performance to prevent the helmet visor from clouding

== Protection ==
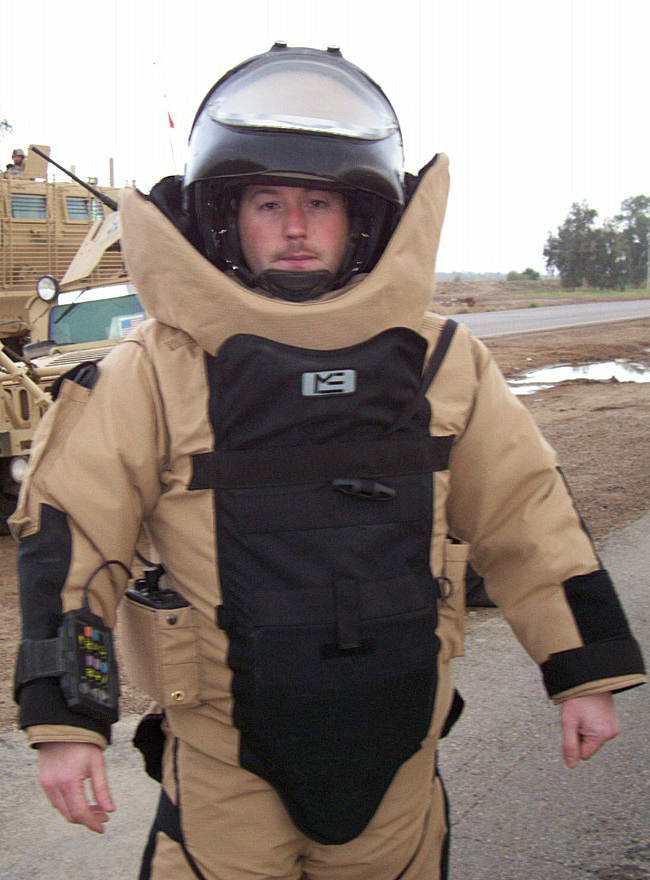
An Advanced Bomb Suit worn by an EOD officer in the 31st Civil Engineer Squadron of the United States Air Force

The pieces of a bomb suit overlap with other pieces for maximum protection from the front and minimal protection for the back and sides from an explosive device. The suit protects in several ways. It deflects or stops projectiles that may come from an exploded device. The second way it protects is by stopping the blast wave from being transmitted and injuring the wearer. Usually, Kevlar, foam, and plastic are layered and covered with fire retardant materials to accomplish these things. It is important that the fibers are strain-rate sensitive, or become more rigid if struck by an object traveling at high speeds, according to a ballistics engineer working for bomb suit manufacturer HighCom Security.

Until the mid-1990s, EOD suits consisted of Kevlar and/or armor plates to stop projectiles. However, the suits did not offer much protection against the blast wave itself. The most recognized injury due to the blast wave is called "blast lung". The lungs (and other internal organs) can be injured by the blast wave and bleed, even when there is no penetrating injury; such internal injuries can be fatal. In the mid-1990s, research conducted in the UK showed that textile and rigid plate armor by themselves do not protect the lungs from blast injury. It was found that a layer with high acoustic impedance with a backing of a softer, low-acoustic impedance layer (such as low density foam) would protect from blast injury. However, it was also shown that it is important to understand the frequency content of the applied blast wave and to experimentally test the way materials are put together to make sure they are effective.

== Ergonomic issues ==
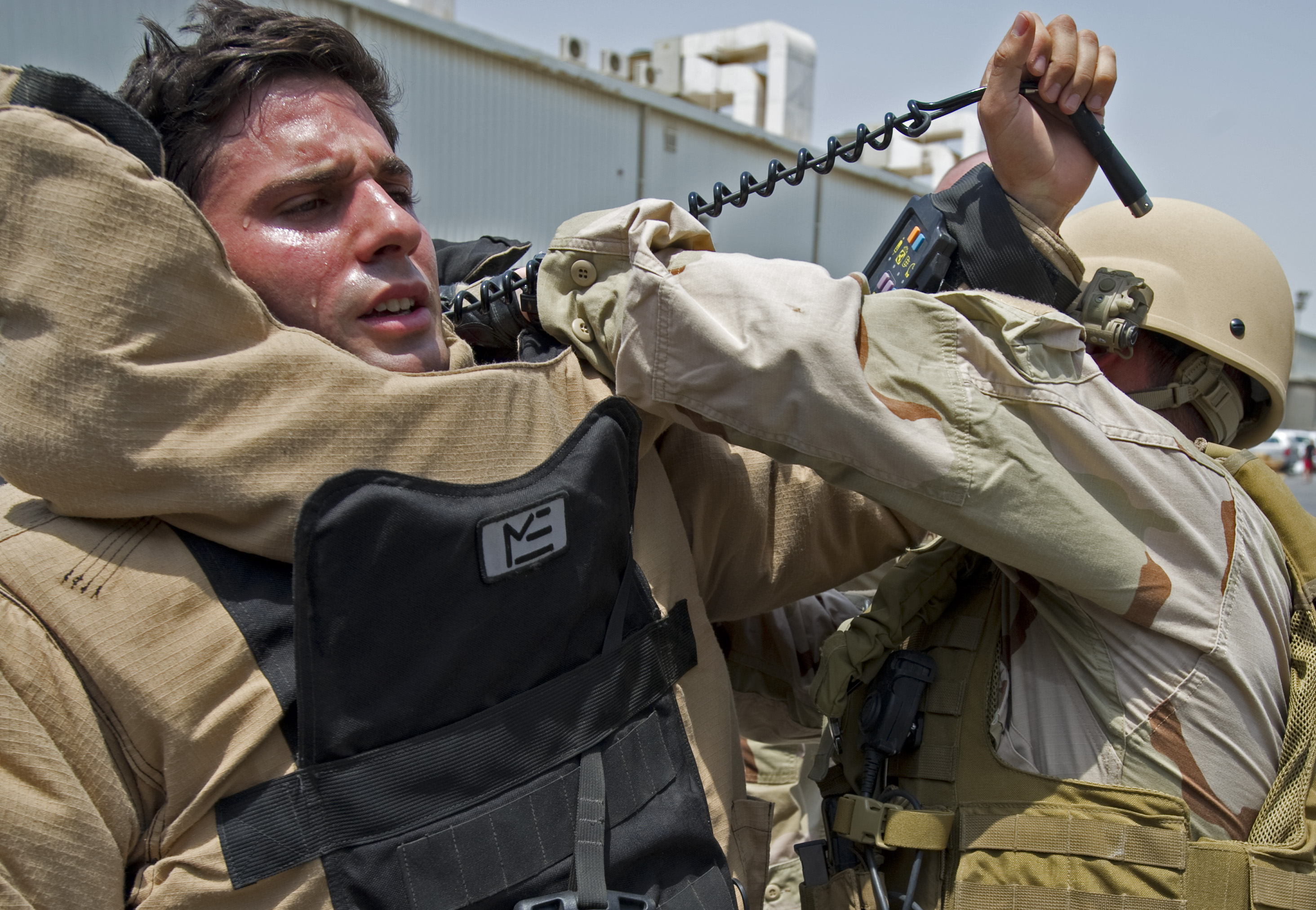
Heat stress can be a problem when wearing an EOD suit.

To effectively stop a blast wave, thick layers of Kevlar, foam and plastic are needed to prevent serious bodily harm. Since the entire body needs protection, the resulting bomb suit is heavy (80 lb (36 kg) or more), hot to the point of risking heat stress, and impairs movement. Therefore, often one individual will put on a suit to approach a device for defusing after it has been identified. The weight of the suit is often a tradeoff with the amount of protection it can provide. A range of bomb suits are thus available so that agencies can choose the needed protection without unnecessary weight when possible. A minimal suit consists of a jacket, apron and helmet that weigh as little as 11 lb (5.0 kg). These are listed as being suitable for demining activities but not EOD.

The materials needed to make bomb suits protective do not release body heat generated by the wearer. The result can be heat stress, which can lead to illness and disorientation, reducing the wearer's ability to accomplish the task. The most recent models of bomb suits include battery-operated cooling systems to prevent heat stress. One manufacturer's study claims that the internal cooling systems on 39 to 81 lb (18 to 37 kg) bomb suits helped the wearer stay at workable temperatures for up to an hour, even in a hot environment.

== See also ==
- Anti-handling device
- Clearance diver
- Counter-IED efforts
- Fuse (explosives)
- Overpressure
- 52nd Ordnance Group (EOD)
- EOD CoE
- Explosive Ordnance Disposal Badge
- Gegana Indonesian police bomb disposal specialists
- Navy EOD
- TEDAX Spanish bomb disposal organisation
