= Palace Barracks =

Military installation in Northern Ireland

- Holywood
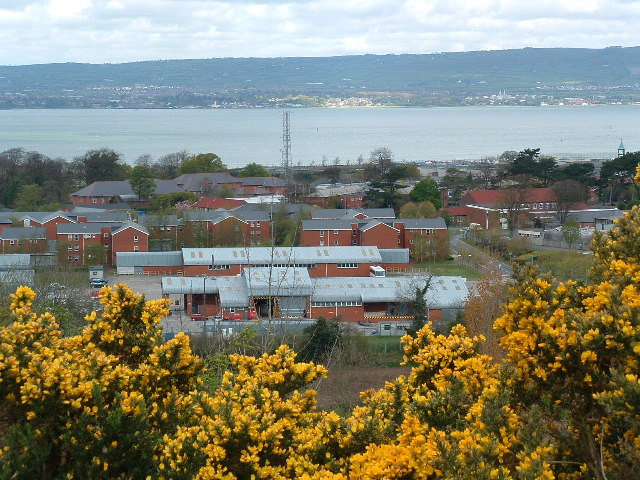
- Palace Barracks

Site information
- Type: Barracks
- Owner: Ministry of Defence
- Operator: British Army

Location
- Location within Northern Ireland
- Coordinates: 54.626°N 05.844°W

Site history
- Built: 1886
- In use: 1886 – present

Garrison information
- Occupants: 1st Battalion, Ranger Regiment MI5 Holywood Troop, 321 EOD & Search Squadron RLC

Palace Barracks, Holywood is a military installation and the Northern Ireland headquarters of MI5, in Holywood, County Down, Northern Ireland.

== History ==
Palace Barracks occupies the site of a palatial house known as "Ardtullagh", the home of the Bishop of Down, Connor and Dromore until it was bought by the UK War Office in 1886.

In 1933, five children of Lance Corporal Harry Poole and his wife, Mary, lost their lives from asphyxiation following gas poisoning in the married quarters of the barracks.

During the roughly three decades of "The Troubles" in Northern Ireland, the barracks served as the home base for battalions rotating through the province, especially those on a two-year "accompanied" tour with their families. A wide variety of facilities are available for soldiers to use off duty, including a swimming pool, squash courts, saunas, bars and a gymnasium.

Palace Barracks became the Regimental Headquarters of the Royal Irish Regiment in 2008.

In March 2010, it was the site of a bombing. An elderly man was blown off his feet and had to be treated in hospital. The bomb was allegedly driven towards the base in a hijacked taxi. The Real IRA claimed responsibility for the attack.

In 2014, it became the base for the Royal Scots Borderers, 1st Battalion, The Royal Regiment of Scotland.

In November 2021, 1 SCOTS was disbanded, and reformed to become 1st Battalion, Ranger Regiment.

== Current units ==
Current units stationed at the camp include:

=== British Army ===
- 1st Battalion, Ranger Regiment
- Regimental Headquarters, 152 (North Irish) Regiment, Royal Logistic Corps
  - 227 (Belfast) Headquarters Squadron
  - 220 (Belfast) Tanker Squadron
  - 400 Petroleum Operator Squadron
- Regimental Headquarters, Royal Irish Regiment
- Holywood Troop, 321 EOD & Search Squadron RLC

=== Royal Navy ===
- Belfast Detachment, Royal Marines Reserve

=== The Security Service ===
- Northern Ireland Headquarters

Palace Barracks is the declared headquarters of MI5 for their investigations into Northern Ireland-related terrorism.
