= Advanced Bomb Suit =

Full body bomb suit

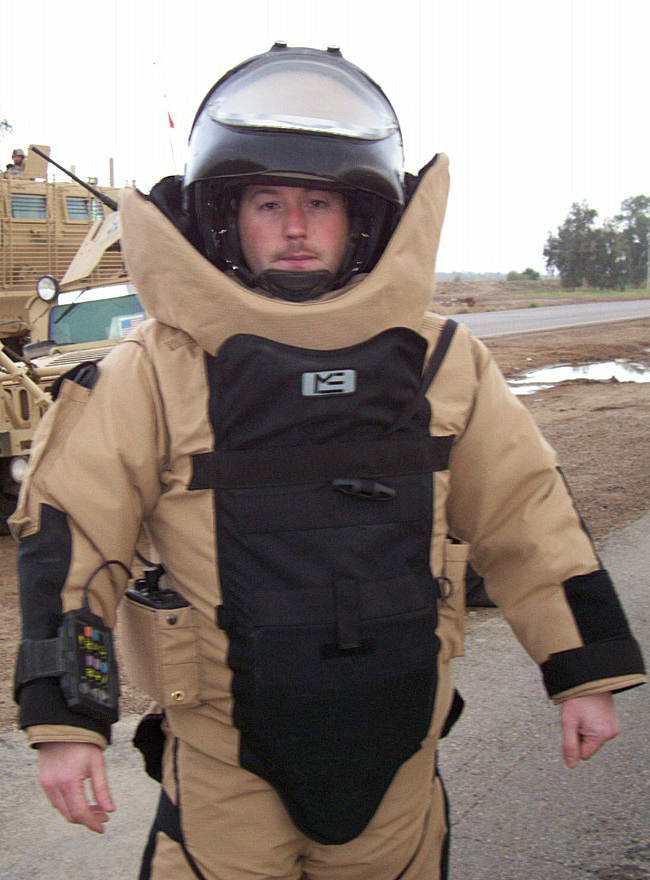
An EOD team leader wearing an Advanced Bomb Suit

The Advanced Bomb Suit (ABS) is a full body bomb suit designed to protect explosive ordnance disposal (EOD) soldiers from threats associated with improvised explosive devices, including those related to fragmentation, blast overpressure, impact, heat, and flame. Manufactured by Med-Eng, the ABS uses new material technology and design to improve protection, comfort, and ergonomics. The suit is constructed from Kevlar with an outer anti-static cover of 50/50 Nomex/Kevlar and comprises a jacket, crotchless trousers, groin cup, and rigid ballistic panels. To minimize weight and maximize flexibility, protection is provided at various levels, specific to body regions, based on susceptibility to wounds. The suit does not provide gloves to the operator so that maximum ability on the hands is present.

== Helmet ==
The helmet, which offers protection against fragments with velocities of over 683 m/s, is made of a lightweight, high strength fibre; and weighs only 3.6 kilograms (7.9 lb) with visor (2.7 kilograms (6.0 lb) without visor). The ergonomic design allows ease of movement and good visibility without neck strain. The visor's fully laminated acrylic and polycarbonate construction increases its margin of safety against multiple fragment hits. The visor provides clear undistorted vision and is also removable. The helmet incorporates MIL-SPEC microphone and speakers and a forced air ventilation system. The battery pack provides up to 5 hours of continuous operation of the ventilation system and uses standard 9V batteries. All wiring in both the suit and the helmet, controlling the ventilation system, is incorporated within the suit itself to eliminate the danger of snagging.

== Communication systems ==
Two systems are available which are compatible with the speakers and microphone fitted to the helmet, as standard.

- The hardwire system is a compact unit and can be used with most standard reels of two wire firing cable without causing distortion. It is supplied with a headset and microphone for use by a second party and avoids the need for a 'push to talk' type system.
- A full duplex, wireless system is also available that features a very low level of RF radiation in transmission, to minimise the risk of activating IEDs at the device, and a very sensitive receiver ensuring that the second party can always be heard.

The user's own voice is played back at a reduced volume level, allowing the user to verify that transmissions are being made and received. The user has the option of switching off the transmitter when reaching a device, while still being able to receive incoming signals. Both systems operate from standard 9 volt rechargeable batteries.

== Protection ==
=== Cooling system ===
For use in hot environments, an optional cooling system is available. This is worn under the suit and consists of a Nomex body suit with a capillary tube network stitched into it. This is connected to a 2-litre water reservoir and pump that circulates ice water around the body. The cooling rate is adjustable so that a comfortable working temperature can be maintained.

=== Fragmentation ===
The greatest threat to the IED technician arises from fragments emitted from the bomb and other objects in the surrounding area which can enter the body at supersonic speeds. The lightweight, removable, composite ballistic panels fitted to the suit protect the upper torso, shoulders, neck, arms and legs while maintaining lightness and maneuverability. In addition, the suit is supplied with rigid ballistic panels to provide added protection to the chest, lower abdomen and groin areas. These have been tested at speeds of up to 1667 m/s.

=== Heat ===
The outer material is constructed from flame retardant Nomex/Kevlar mix which protects the user against burns.

=== Overpressure ===
The pressure wave from a blast can cause severe damage to the lungs, eardrums and cause trauma in other body areas. The design of the suit is such that both sets of ballistic panels limit the effects of the overpressure on the body, while the collar completely encloses the neck area and overlaps the helmet.

=== Impact ===
The impact of the blast on the body can cause differential acceleration between the head and torso which can break the neck and cause damage to the spine. The suit is fitted with an articulated spine protector while the raised suit collar overlapping the helmet limits the differential acceleration between body and head.

== In popular culture ==
The ABS is prominently shown in the movie The Hurt Locker, about U.S. Army bomb-disposal troops serving in Iraq.
