= Eric Moxey =

Eric Lawrence Moxey
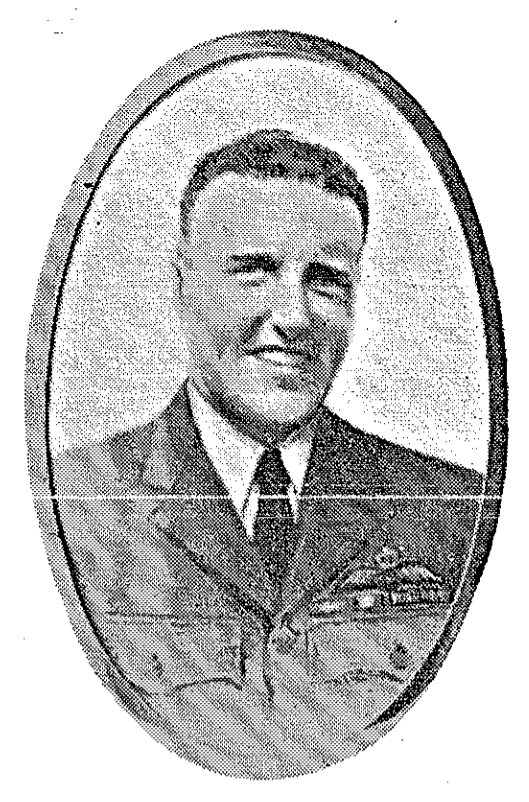
- Born: 14 April 1894; São Paulo, Brazil
- Died: 27 August 1940 (aged 46); Biggin Hill, England
- Burial place: St. Peter & St. Paul, Cudham, Orpington, Kent
- Military career
- Allegiance: United Kingdom
- Branch: British Army; Royal Air Force
- Rank: Squadron Leader
- Service number: 73498
- Conflicts: First World War: Battle of the Somme; Battle of Albert; First day on the Somme; Second World War: Home Front; The Blitz †
- Awards: George Cross

Eric Lawrence Moxey, GC (14 April 1894 – 27 August 1940) was an officer of the Royal Air Force Volunteer Reserve who was posthumously awarded the George Cross for attempting to defuse enemy bombs on an airfield in 1940.

== Early life and family ==
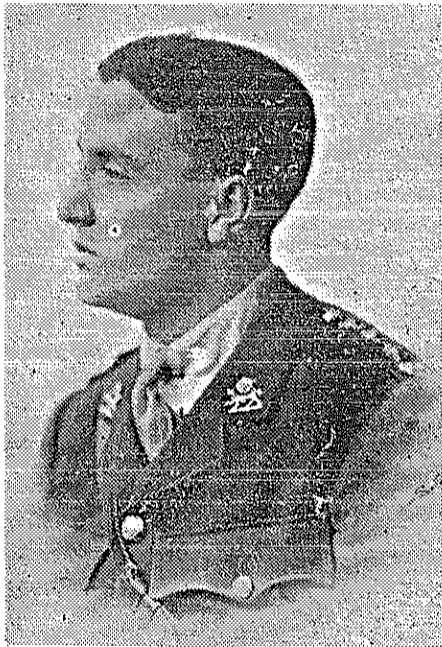
Eric Lawrence Moxey during WW1

Moxey was born in São Paulo, Brazil, to English parents William Hall Moxey, Director of the São Paulo Railway Company and Margaret Moxey. He was educated in England at Malvern School and Sheffield University while working in the city at Vickers Limited. He was a keen motorcyclist and achieved some successes at Brooklands and the Isle of Man TT, where he won a gold medal as a top-placed amateur.

At the outbreak of the First World War in 1914, Moxey entered the British Army to serve in the infantry. He saw action on the first day of the Somme as a lieutenant in the 7th Platoon of the 12th York and Lancaster Regiment (Sheffield City Battalion) and was one of four men to return that day. He remained in the army until 1917, rising to the rank of captain, when he transferred to the Royal Flying Corps.

In 1916 Moxey married May Arthur Clark, daughter of William Clark, then managing director of Vickers, and sister to Captain William S Clark, who fought alongside Moxey in the First World War and died on the first day of the Somme.

In 1919, Moxey left the Royal Flying Corps and returned to Sheffield to act as Sales Director for Vickers, where he remained until 1926 when he became managing director of the New Conveyor Company in Smethwick. In 1935, he formed the Moxey Conveyor Company, which later became Babcock Moxey, which in turn was purchased by Claudius Peters, one of the Langley Holdings companies.

Moxey and May had four children:

- Douglas Erskine Moxey (1918–1984) – Served in the Royal Navy Volunteer Reserves on-board HMS Ark Royal during the Battle of Spartivento, HMS Eagle and HMS Emperor. Douglas later took over the running of Babcock Moxey when Eric was killed.
- Nigel Hall Moxey (1921–1942) – Pilot Officer in the Royal Air Force Volunteer Reserves. He was shot down and killed in Cairo in August 1942, forming part of the build-up to the Battle of Alam el Halfa. He is buried in Heliopolis.
- Jonathan Kirkwood Moxey (1924–1985) – Jack, as he was known, served as Navigator on Motor Launch 269 during the D-Day invasion of North France, having been seconded from his role as an Observer in the Fleet Air Arm. He later worked for several engineering firms before retiring to Alderney in 1972 with ill health
- William Hall Moxey (1924–2011)

== Second World War ==
After the outbreak of the Second World War Moxey volunteered and was posted to the RAF Intelligence as part of the "Special Duties" team, where he was tasked with bomb disposal and became a pioneer in the investigation of enemy bombs and armaments. While there, he invented the "Fuze Extractor", the original safe defusing device for German bombs

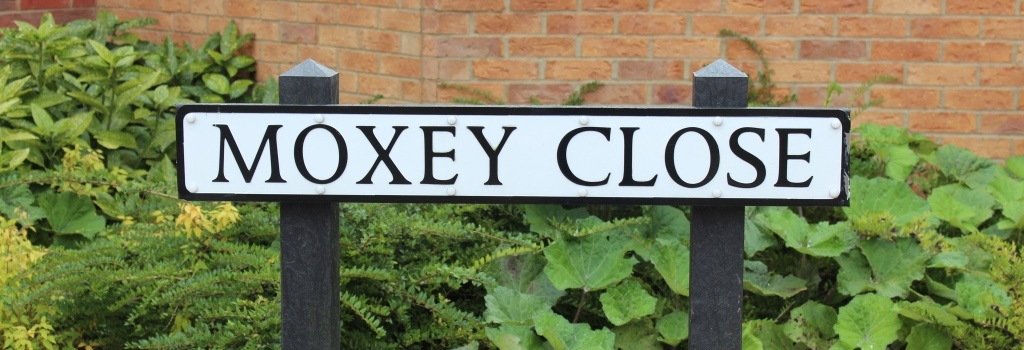
Road sign for Eric Lawrence Moxey, killed at Biggin Hill in 1940

After a Luftwaffe raid on the aerodrome at Biggin Hill on 27 August 1940, Moxey, then an acting squadron leader, was called to remove the unexploded bombs which had buried themselves into a runway. He successfully dealt with one bomb, opening the runway up to RAF fighter pilots to defend the capital. However, when he attempted to clear the second, it exploded, killing him instantly.

It was for this act he was awarded the George Cross, becoming the first person to be awarded the medal posthumously. His citation, which appeared in the London Gazette of 17 December 1940, read:

The King has been graciously pleased to approve of the posthumous award of the George Cross to :—

Acting Squadron Leader Eric Lawrence Moxey (73498), Royal Air Force Volunteer reserve.

On the 27th August, 1940, it was reported that two unexploded bombs were embedded in an aerodrome. Squadron Leader Moxey, a technical intelligence officer employed at the Air Ministry, immediately volunteered to proceed to the site and remove them, though from the nature of his duties he was very fully aware of the risk entailed in such an operation. One of the bombs exploded causing his death. On many occasions Squadron Leader Moxey has exhibited similar complete disregard for his personal safety.

Moxey has since been remembered with a road named in his honour on a housing development beside Biggin Hill Aerodrome.
