= 321 EOD & Search Squadron RLC =

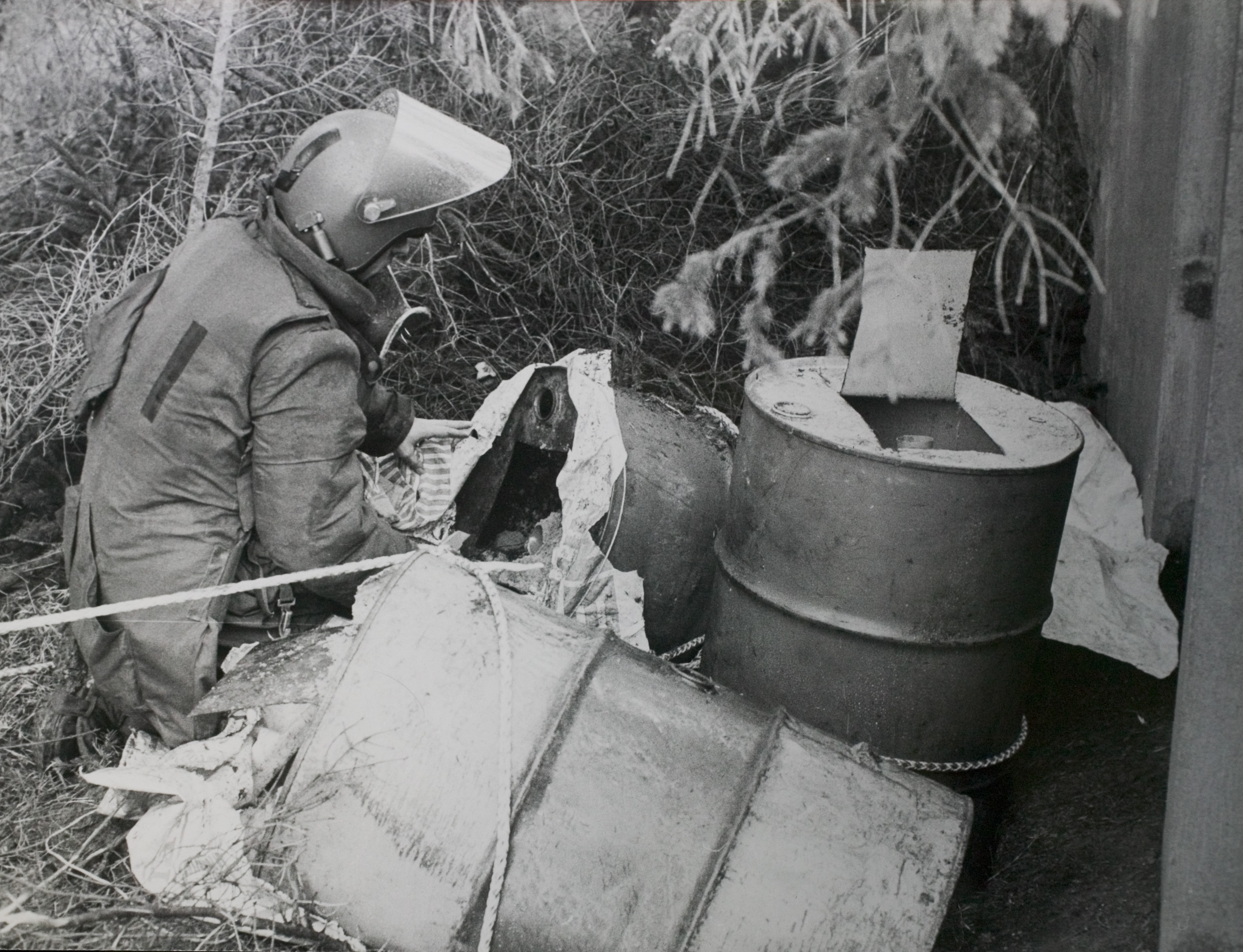
- Home-made explosives being dealt with by an EOD Operator from 321 EOD, in 1984
- Active: Unknown - Present
- Country: United Kingdom
- Branch: British Army
- Role: Military Aid to the Civil Authority
- Size: Squadron
- Garrison/HQ: Alexander Barracks, Aldergrove
- Corps: Royal Logistic Corps

Insignia
- Tactical recognition flash

321 EOD & Search Squadron, 11 EOD Regiment RLC is a unit of the British Army responsible for Explosive Ordnance Disposal and Search duties in Northern Ireland.

The unit was previously titled 321 EOD Unit, then 321 EOD Company Royal Army Ordnance Corps (RAOC). It was re-badged as a unit of the Royal Logistic Corps in April 1993, now part of 11 Explosive Ordnance Disposal and Search Regiment RLC. With its headquarters at Alexander Barracks, Aldergrove near Antrim, the unit covers the entire province of Northern Ireland.

The unit is honoured at the Palace Barracks memorial garden. It remains the most decorated unit in the British Army. 321 is a well equipped unit and has been at the forefront of developing new equipment.

== Detachments ==
Whilst Operation Banner was running, 321 EOD had detachments at the following locations

- Derry
- Lurgan
- Armagh
- Omagh
- Bessbrook
- Belfast
- Lisburn
- Magherafelt

As at Oct 2015, the Sqn is based at Alexander Barracks, Aldergrove and Palace Barracks in Belfast

== See also ==
- Wheelbarrow (robot)
