= List of newspapers published by Newsquest =

List of newspapers published by Newsquest.

== Daily titles ==
City	Title	Beginning	Frequency	Call numbers	Remarks
Basildon	The Echo	1969	Daily	2042-0722	
Blackburn	Lancashire Telegraph	1886	Daily	1746-0522	
Bolton	The Bolton News	1867	Daily	1752-3001	
Bournemouth	Bournemouth Daily Echo	1900	Daily	1368-3837	
Bradford	Telegraph & Argus	1868	Daily	0307-3610	
Brighton	The Argus	1880	Daily	0962-6883	
Carlisle	News and Star	1910	Daily	1355-9532	
Colchester	Daily Gazette	1970	Daily	2044-7531	
Darlington	The Northern Echo	1870	Daily	2043-0442	
Glasgow	Glasgow Times	1876	Daily	0307-5745	
Glasgow	The Herald	1783	Daily	0965-9439	
Glasgow	The National	2014	Daily	2057-231X	
Greenock	Greenock Telegraph	1857	Daily	0963-3219	
Ipswich	East Anglian Daily Times	1874	Daily	0307-0921	Archant title gained in 2022.
Ipswich	Ipswich Star	1885	Daily	2049-6583	Archant title gained in 2022.
Kendal	The Mail	1898	Daily	0964-1009	
Newport	South Wales Argus	1892	Daily	0307-5222	
Norwich	Eastern Daily Press	1870	Daily	0307-0956	Archant title gained in 2022.
Norwich	Norwich Evening News	1882	Daily	0964-4946	Archant title gained in 2022.
Oxford	Oxford Mail	1928	Daily	0962-8223	
Southampton	Southern Daily Echo	1888	Daily	0969-5702	
Swindon	Swindon Advertiser	1854	Daily	0964-105X	
Weymouth	Dorset Echo	1921	Daily	2515-852X	
Worcester	Worcester News	1935	Daily	1747-9150	
York	The Press	1882	Daily	1757-3289	

== Weekly titles ==
- Andover Advertiser
- Ardrossan and Saltcoats Herald
- Armley & Wortley Advertiser
- Asian Eye
- Avon Advertiser, Salisbury
- Ayrshire Weekly Press
- Banbury Cake
- Barnes, Mortlake & Sheen Times
- Barnet & Potters Bar Times
- Barry & District News
- Basildon Recorder
- Basingstoke Gazette
- Berrow's Worcester Journal
- Bexley News Shopper
- Bicester Advertiser
- Bishops Stortford Citizen
- Blackburn Citizen Group
- Blackpool Citizen Group
- Bolton Journal
- Borehamwood & Elstree Times
- Bradford Target
- Braintree & Witham Times
- Bramhall Community News
- Bramley Advertiser
- Brentford, Chiswick and Isleworth Times
- Brentwood/Billericay Weekly News
- Bridgwater Mercury
- Bridport & Lyme Regis News
- Brighton and Hove Leader
- Bromley News Shopper
- Bromsgrove Advertiser
- Bucks Free Press
- Burnham & Highbridge Weekly News
- Burnley Citizen Group
- Bury Journal
- Bury Times
- Caerphilly Campaign
- Campaign Quicksearch
- Castlepoint/Rayleigh Standard
- Chard & Ilminster News
- Chelmsford and Mid Essex Times
- Cheltenham Independent
- Chester-le-Street Advertiser
- Chorley Citizen
- Clacton & Frinton Gazette
- Colchester & East Essex Express
- Congleton Guardian
- Consett & Stanley Advertiser
- County Independent
- Craven Herald & Pioneer
- Crewe & Nantwich Guardian
- Cummnock Chronicle (Ayrshire)
- Darlington & Stockton Times
- Darlington/Aycliffe Advertiser
- Denbighshire Free Press
- Devizes, Melksham & Vale of Pewsey News
- Dorking Life
- Dorset Advertiser
- Dudley News
- Dunfermline Press
- Durham Advertiser
- Ealing Times
- East London and West Essex Guardian Series (www.guardian-series.co.uk)
  - Chingford Guardian (Chingford)
  - Epping Forest Guardian
  - Epping Forest Independent
  - Waltham Forest Guardian
  - Waltham Forest Independent
  - Wanstead and Woodford Guardian
- Edgware & Mill Hill Times
- Elmbridge Guardian
- Enfield Independent
- Epping, North Weald & Ongar Guardian
- Epsom & Banstead Guardian
- Essex County Standard
- Essex Weekly News
- Evesham Admag
- Evesham Journal
- Falmouth Packet – see Packet Newspapers.
- Fish 4 Jobs Yorkshire
- Gatwick Life
- Gazette & Herald, Wiltshire
- Gloucester Independent
- Gloucestershire County Gazette
- Hackney Gazette
- Halesowen News
- Halstead Gazette
- Hampshire Chronicle
- Ham & High (the original title Hampstead & Highgate Express is retained on the newspaper's "Contact Us" page)
- Haringey Independent
- Harlow Citizen
- Harrow Times
- Harwich & Manningtree Standard
- Helston Packet – see Packet Newspapers
- Hendon & Finchley Times
- Hereford Times
- Hillingdon & Uxbridge Times
- Horley Life
- Ilkley Gazette
- Isle of Wight County Press
- Keighley News
- Keighley & Craven Target
- Kingston Guardian
- Knutsford Guardian
- Lancaster & Morecambe Citizen
- Largs and Millport Weekly News
- Ledbury Gazette
- Leigh Journal
- Leisure Review
- Lewisham News Shopper
- Loughton, Chigwell and Buckhurst Hill Guardian
- Ludlow Advertiser
- Maldon & Burnham Standard
- Malvern Gazette
- Mid Devon Star
- Mid Sussex Leader
- Milford Mercury
- Muswell Hill & Crouch End Times
- New Forest Post
- NewsExtra, Eastleigh & Winchester
- Newton & Golborne Guardian
- North Yorks Advertiser
- Northwich Guardian
- Oswestry & Border Counties Advertizer
- Oxfordshire Herald
- Oxford Star
- Packet Newspapers
- Penarth Times
- Penwith Pirate
- Pontypool Free Press
- Powys County Times
- Preston Citizen Group
- Prestwich & Whitefield Guide
- Property Weekly
- Pudsey Advertiser
- Putney & Wandsworth Guardian
- Putney & Wimbledon Times
- Radcliffe Times
- Reading Chronicle
- Redbridge, Waltham Forest & West Essex Guardian
- Redditch Advertiser
- Redruth/Camborne Packet – see Packet Newspapers
- Redhill & Reigate Life
- Richmond & Twickenham Times
- Romford Recorder
- Runcorn & Widnes World
- St Albans & Harpenden Observer
- St Albans & Harpenden Review
- St Helens Star
- Sale & Altrincham Messenger
- Salisbury Journal
- Sedgemoor Star
- Sidmouth Herald
- Somerset County Gazette
- Southampton Advertiser
- South Bucks Star
- South Coast & Lewes Leader
- Southend Standard
- Southern Property Advertiser
- South Wales Guardian
- Stourbridge News
- Stratford Guardian
- Streatham Guardian
- Stretford & Urmston Messenger
- Stroud News & Journal
- Sunday Herald (Glasgow)
- Surrey Comet
- Sutton & Croydon Guardian
- Swanage & Wareham Advertiser
- Swindon Star
- Target Series (Bradford)
- Taunton Star
- Teddington and Hampton Times
- Tenbury Wells Advertiser
- Tewkesbury AdMag
- The Cleveland Clarion
- The Impartial Reporter
- The Oxford Times
- The Romsey Advertiser
- The Shuttle
- The South Lakes Citizen
- The Watford Free
- Thurrock Gazette
- Tivyside Advertiser (Cardigan, Ceredigion)
- Tottenham & Wood Green Independent
- Truro Packet – see Packet Newspapers
- Waltham Abbey Guardian
- Walton & Weybridge Guardian
- Wandsworth Guardian
- Warrington Guardian
- Watford Observer
- Wear Valley Advertiser
- Welwyn & Hatfield Review
- West Craven Town Crier
- Western Telegraph, Pembrokeshire
- Westmorland Gazette
- Weymouth & Dorchester Advertiser
- Wharfedale & Airedale Observer
- Whitchurch Herald
- Widnes World
- Wilts & Gloucestershire Standard
- Wiltshire Star
- Wiltshire Times Group
- Wimbledon Guardian
- Wimbledon News
- Winsford & Middlewich Guardian
- Wirral Globe
- Witney Gazette
- Yeovil Express
- York Advertiser
- York Star
