= Your Local Guardian =

Your Local Guardian is a mass rebranding of a number of local newspapers published by Newsquest, which adopted the common name Your Local Guardian and the similarly designed masthead with each newspaper adding the name of the location it covers. Each weekly outlet covers mostly its own local news, community, sport, leisure, job opportunities as well as homes, cars, entertainment and local events. The original Your Local Guardian goes to Croydon Guardian that kept the main website yourlocalguardian.co.uk.

The newspapers now known as Your Local Guardian include:

== Sutton & Croydon Guardian ==
This was a result of a merger of:

- Croydon Guardian (for London Borough of Croydon, South London, and surrounding areas Hounslow, Kingston, Sutton, Merton, Wandsworth, London & Surrey)
- Sutton Guardian (for regions of Sutton, Cheam, Carshalton, Hackbridge, and Wallington)

Other sister publication covering other localities and also known as Your Local Guardian include:

- Bromley News Shopper
- Wimbledon Guardian
- Streatham Guardian
- Wandsworth Guardian later Wandsworth Times
- Lewisham News Shopper (for the London Boroughs of Lewisham and Greenwich)
- Epsom Guardian

== East London and West Essex Guardian ==
This is a result of the Guardian Series of the Chingford, Wanstead and Woodford and Waltham Forest editions merged in 2018 under the banner Your Local Guardian that includes:

- Chingford Guardian
- Epping Forest Guardian
- Waltham Forest Guardian
- Wanstead and Woodford Guardian

== See also ==
- List of newspapers published by Newsquest
- News Shopper
