= Urmston (disambiguation) =

Urmston is a town in England. Urmston may also refer to:

== People ==
- Chadwick Stokes Urmston (born 1976), American musician
- Harriett Urmston (1828–1897), British missionary in India

== Other uses ==
- Urmston (ward), ward in England
- Urmston Grammar, grammar school in England
- Urmston Musical Theatre, amateur theatre company in England
- Urmston railway station, railway station in England
- Urmston Road, body of water in Hong Kong
- Urmston Urban District, local government district in England
- Stretford and Urmston (UK Parliament constituency),
- Stretford & Urmston Advertiser, newspaper in England
- Stretford & Urmston Messenger, newspaper in England
- All Saints' Church, Urmston, church in England
