= Brent & Kilburn Times =

British newspaper

Brent and Kilburn Times

- Type: Weekly newspaper
- Owner: USA Today Co.
- Founder: Rowland Bassett
- Publisher: Newsquest
- Founded: 1868
- Language: English
- Headquarters: London, England
- Circulation: 9,832 (as of 2023)
- Website: kilburntimes.co.uk

The Brent and Kilburn Times is a British weekly newspaper published by Newsquest in the London Borough of Brent, currently published on Thursdays. It provides local news in Kilburn, Wembley and other surrounding areas.

== History ==
The paper dates back to the first issue of the Kilburn Times on 14 March 1868. It was founded by Rowland George Bassett (c. 1842-1906) and was based in Kilburn. Another paper, the Willesden Chronicle and Herald, was launched in 1877; a year later the two papers merged and the new office and printing works was based on High Road, Willesden. At the time, the Kilburn Times was heavily favoured by the working class and the Irish community, as opposed to its more middle class rival Harrow Observer.

A national press guide published in 1875 called the Kilburn Times one of the "largest, cheapest and most influential newspapers in the west and north west of London", and "it is undeniably the best advertising medium in the district."

The Kilburn Times launched a new website in 2010. The other paper, later renamed the Willesden & Brent Chronicle and then the Willesden & Brent Times, ended publication in 2011 as it was amalgamated with the Kilburn Times to create the Brent & Kilburn Times.

== Other newspapers overspilling in the area ==
- Camden New Journal
- Hampstead & Highgate Express
- Harrow Times
