= Wembley =

Suburb of London, England

Coordinates: 51.5528°N 0.2979°W

- Suburb in London
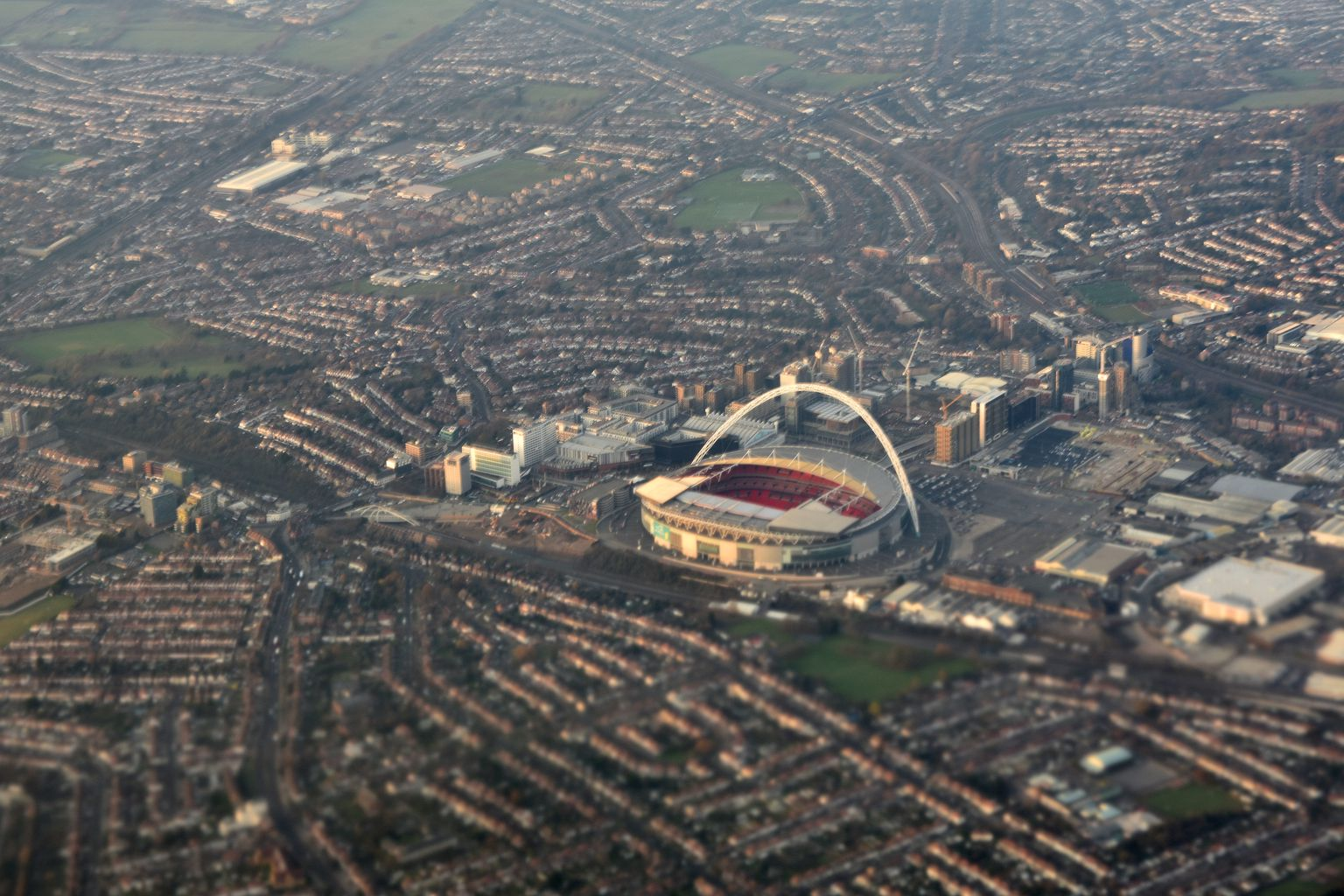
- An aerial view of Wembley, showing part of High Road, the industrial estate, Wembley Arena and Wembley Stadium

- Location within Greater London
- Population: 102,856 (2011 Census)
- OS grid reference: TQ175855
- London borough: Brent
- Ceremonial county: Greater London
- Region: London
- Country: England
- Sovereign state: United Kingdom
- Post town: WEMBLEY
- Postcode district: HA0, HA9
- Dialling code: 020
- Police: Metropolitan
- Fire: London
- Ambulance: London
- UK Parliament: Brent West
- London Assembly: Brent and Harrow

Wembley (/ˈwɛmbli/) is a district in the London Borough of Brent, north-west London, 8 miles (13 km) northwest of Charing Cross. It includes the wards of Alperton, Barn Hill, Kenton, Northwick Park, Preston, Sudbury, Tokyngton and Wembley Central, Wembley Hill and Wembley Park. The population was 133,616 in 2021, an increase of 20,000 since 2011.

Wembley was for over 800 years part of the parish of Harrow on the Hill in Middlesex. Its heart, Wembley Green, was surrounded by agricultural manors and their hamlets. The small, narrow, Wembley High Street is a conservation area. The railways of the London & Birmingham Railway reached Wembley in the mid-19th century, when the place gained its first church. Slightly south-west of the old core, the main station was originally called Sudbury, but today is known as Wembley Central. By the 1920s, the nearby long High Road hosted a wide array of shops and Wembley was a large suburb of London. Wembley then, within three decades, became an integral outer district of London, in density and contiguity. Wembley formed a separate civil parish from 1894, incorporated as a municipal borough of Middlesex in 1937. In 1965, when local government in London was reformed, the area merged with the Municipal Borough of Willesden, which was separated by the River Brent, to create the London Borough of Brent, one of the 32 local government districts of Greater London.

The estate of Wembley Park was largely pleasure grounds when the Metropolitan Railway reached this part in 1894. It was chosen to host the British Empire Exhibition in 1924, resulting in the development of landmarks including the Empire Stadium, later known as Wembley Stadium, which became an iconic football stadium. Suburban protection of public parkland and low-to-mid building density of all but high-rise western Wembley Park means most of Wembley is integral to and archetypal of the once well-advertised – mainly Middlesex – Metroland. After years of debate, the 1923 stadium was replaced by a modernised stadium with a grand, skyline arch which opened in 2007; it is home to the England national football team, hosts latter and/or final stages of annual competitions such as the FA Cup and has the greatest capacity nationwide. In the early 21st century the London Designer Outlet pedestrianised plaza was built.

== History ==
Wembley (civil parish then Metropolitan Borough from its inception) population
◄ Split from Harrow on the Hill
1901	4,519
1911	10,696
1921	16,187
1931	48,561
◄ From abolition, 1 April 1934, of Kingsbury Urban District (1,827 acres (7.39 km^{2})) until 1965 about, that is if static as at 1931, 16,636 residents, absorbed
1939	112,563
1951	131,384
1961	124,892
Note no 1941 census due to war
source: UK census/The 1939 Register

=== Toponymy ===
Wembley is derived from the Old English proper name "Wemba" and the Old English "lea" for meadow or clearing. The name was first mentioned in the charter of 825 of Selvin. A further instance may be seen in the Plea Rolls of the Common Pleas, as Wambeleye.

=== The old manor ===
The village of Wembley grew up on the hill by the clearing with the Harrow Road south of it. Much of the surrounding area remained wooded. In 1547 there were but six houses in Wembley. Though small, it was one of the wealthiest parts of Harrow. At the dissolution of the monasteries in 1543, the manor of Wembley fell to Richard Andrews and Leonard Chamberlain, who sold it to Richard Page, Esq., of Harrow on the Hill, the same year. There was a mill on Wembley Hill by 1673.

The Page family continued as lords of the manor of Wembley for several centuries and eventually commissioned Humphry Repton (1752–1818) the landscape gardener to design what is now Wembley Park. Wembley Park thus derived its name from Repton's habit of referring to the areas he designed as "parks".

The former Barley Mow pub was recorded in 1722 thus was the earliest long-lasting pub of Wembley.

=== Railways, parish formed and development ===
In 1837, the London & Birmingham Railway (now part of the West Coast Main Line) was opened from London Euston through Wembley to Hemel Hempstead, and completed to Birmingham Curzon Street the following year. The changing names of the local station demonstrated the increasing importance of the 'Wembley' name. 'Sudbury' station opened in 1845, renamed as 'Sudbury and Wembley' in 1882, renamed as 'Wembley for Sudbury' in 1910, renamed as 'Wembley Central' in 1948, at the time of the Olympic Games.

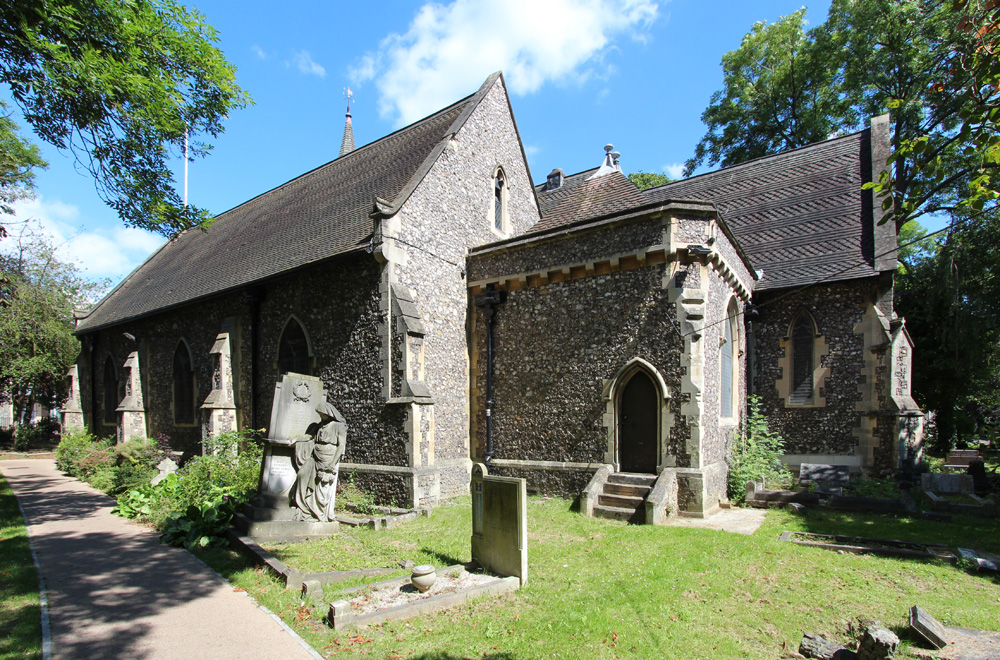
St John the Evangelist church was built in 1846

To modernise the service, a new Watford DC line was built alongside the main lines and Bakerloo line trains, and electric trains to Broad Street started in 1917. Electric trains to London Euston began running in 1922. Since 1917, there have been six platforms at what is now Wembley Central station. In 1880, the Metropolitan Railway opened its line from Baker Street through the eastern side of Wembley, but only built a station, Wembley Park, in 1894. There are now three physically separate services, the London to Aylesbury Line, the Metropolitan line and the Jubilee line. Only the latter two services have platforms at Wembley Park station.

Anne and Frances Copland, who in 1843 inherited Sudbury Lodge and its lands, gave a plot for a church to serve the southern part of Harrow parish. In spite of less support from local farmers, who preferred part of Lord Northwick's property on Wembley Hill, the sisters' offer was accepted since they would bear all the cost of building. The church of Saint John the Evangelist, Wembley, designed by George Gilbert Scott and W. B. Moffatt, was consecrated in 1846, in which year Wembley became a parish. It was built of flint with stone dressings, in the Gothic style, and comprised chancel, nave, northeast chapel, and wooden bell turret. A north aisle was added in 1859 and a south aisle in 1900; extensions were made to the west to designs of G. P. Pratt in 1935. It has one church bell.

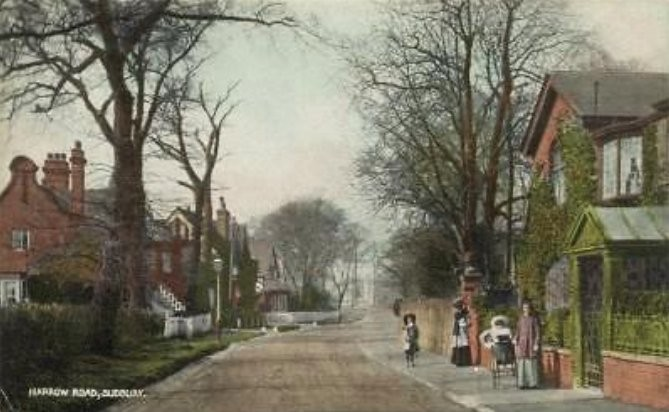
Harrow Road, c. 1910, showing Sudbury Park Farm on the left and Crabs House on the right (now buildings of Barham Park)

In November 1905, the Great Central Railway (now, in this section, part of the Chiltern Main Line) opened a new route for fast expresses that by-passed the congested Metropolitan Railway tracks. It ran between Neasden Junction, south of Wembley, and Northolt Junction, west of London, where a new joint main line with the Great Western Railway began. Local passenger services from London Marylebone were added from March 1906, when new stations were opened, including 'Wembley Hill', next to what later became the site of Wembley Stadium – the national stadium of English sport – which opened for the FA Cup Final of April 1923, remaining open for 77 years until it closed for reconstruction in October 2000. After a long planning and redevelopment process dogged by a series of funding problems and construction delays, the new stadium finally opened its doors in March 2007. Wembley Hill station was renamed 'Wembley Complex' in May 1978, before getting its present name of 'Wembley Stadium' in May 1987.

Wembley was also served by tram (route 62) and later trolleybus (route 662) which ran through the Harrow Road from Sudbury to Paddington until the abandonment of the networks. The route is now mostly served by bus route 18 which is also one of the busiest bus routes in all of London today.

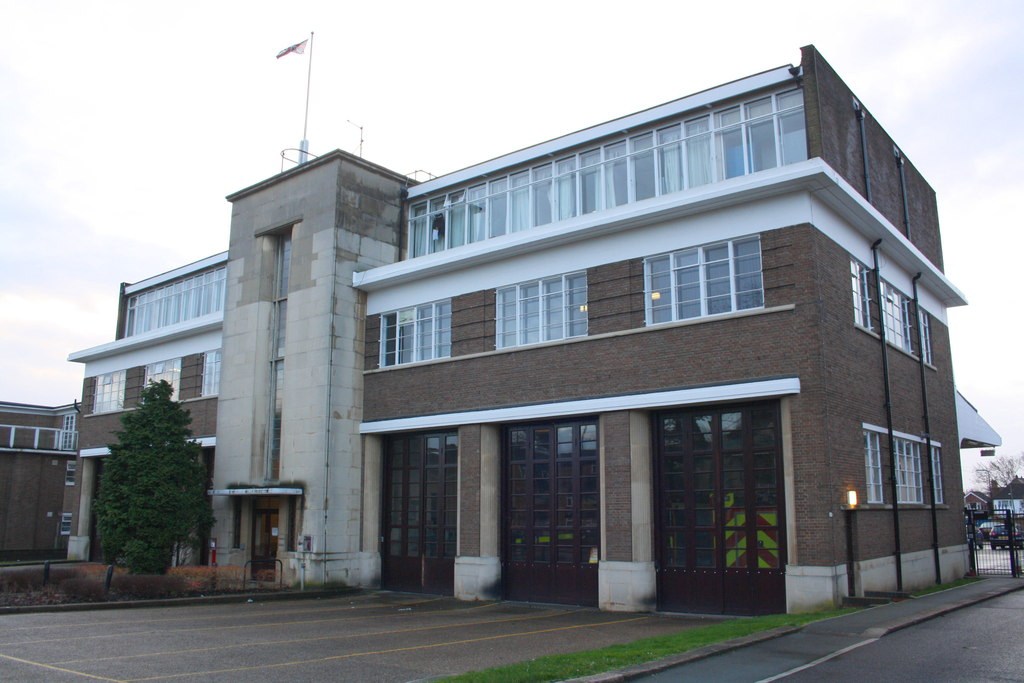
Wembley Fire Station

The 1937-built fire brigade headquarters of Middlesex County Council on Harrow Road, in Moderne style, is now a fire station of the London Fire Brigade. It is statutorily recognised and protected in the initial category, Grade II, of listed building.

Wembley, in common with much of northwest London, had an extensive manufacturing industry, but much of it closed in the 1980s. Its factories included Glacier Metals (bearings), Wolf Power Tools, Sunbeam Electrical Appliances, Griffin & George (laboratory equipment) and GEC (whose research laboratories, opened in 1923, were one of the first of their type in the United Kingdom).

=== Empire Exhibition and the Stadium ===
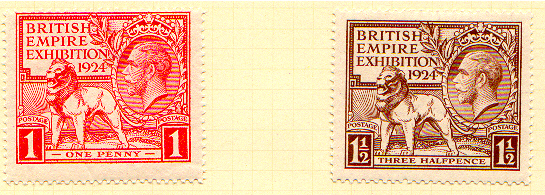
British Empire Exhibition postage stamps

What had been Wembley Park hosted the British Empire Exhibition of 1924–1925. Until the 2000s, remnants of the many reinforced concrete buildings, including the original Wembley Stadium, remained, but nearly all have now been removed, to make way for redevelopment.

Most of the rest of Wembley's housing consists of inter-war semi-detached houses and terraces and of modern apartment blocks, with a significant minority of detached houses.

Expansion in the town centre continued. In 1929 the Majestic Theatre was opened, later becoming Odeon Wembley cinema. It closed in 1961 and was demolished, replaced by a C&A store (today a Wilko store). Another cinema in the town was an ABC cinema originally opened as The Regal in 1937, on Ealing Road, which operated until 1976. After this it operated for some years as an independent cinema showcasing Bollywood films. The building was demolished in 1987.

=== Post-war ===
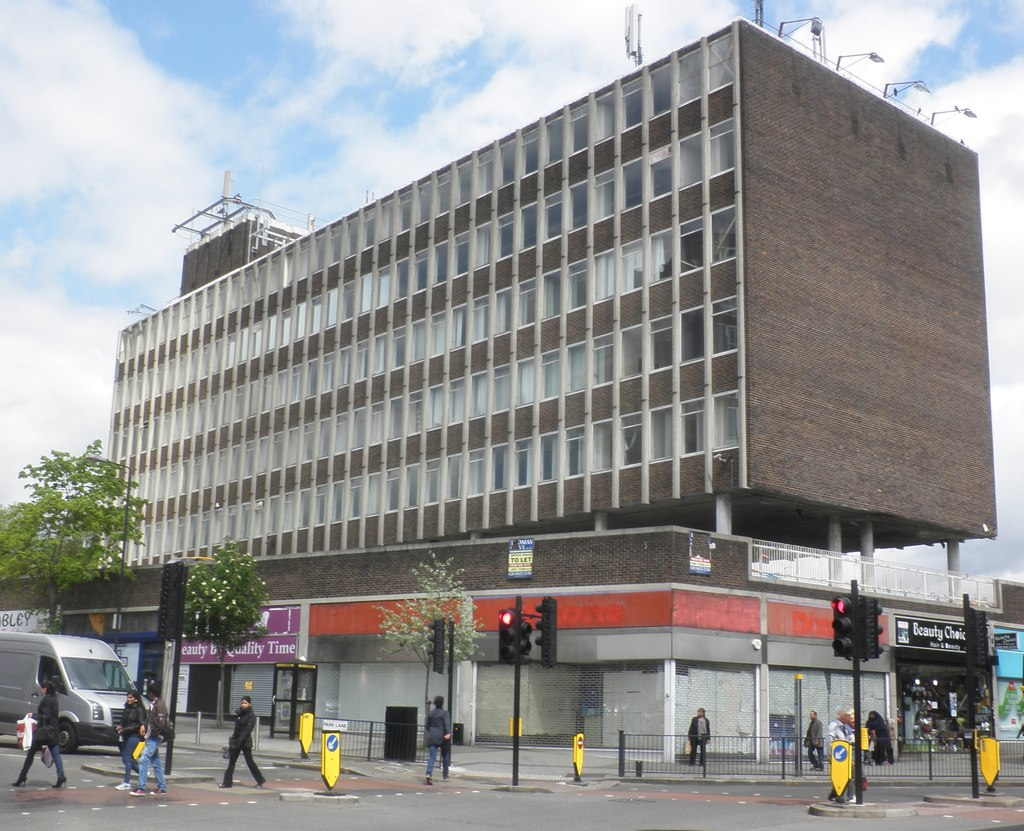
Chesterfield House, demolished in 2017

During the 1960s, rebuilding of Wembley Central station, a block of flats, an open-plan shopping plaza, and a car park were constructed on a concrete raft over the railway. The retail centre of Wembley (the High Road and north end of Ealing Road) has suffered from chronic traffic congestion and from the opening of neighbouring purpose-built shopping centres, first Brent Cross Shopping Centre in the 1970s and later the Harrow and Ealing Broadway shopping centres.

Following continuing decline, Wembley had become unattractive and increasingly derelict by the century's end. However the large Indian community in the town maintained a growing jewellery market with their shops on Ealing Road.

A British Army recruitment centre led away from the High Road and came under attack by an IRA bomb in 1990, seeing a soldier die and four people injured (see 1990 Wembley bombing).

=== Recent regenerations ===
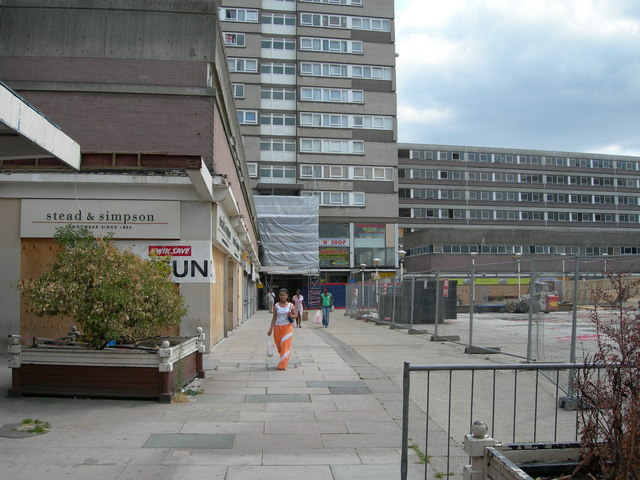
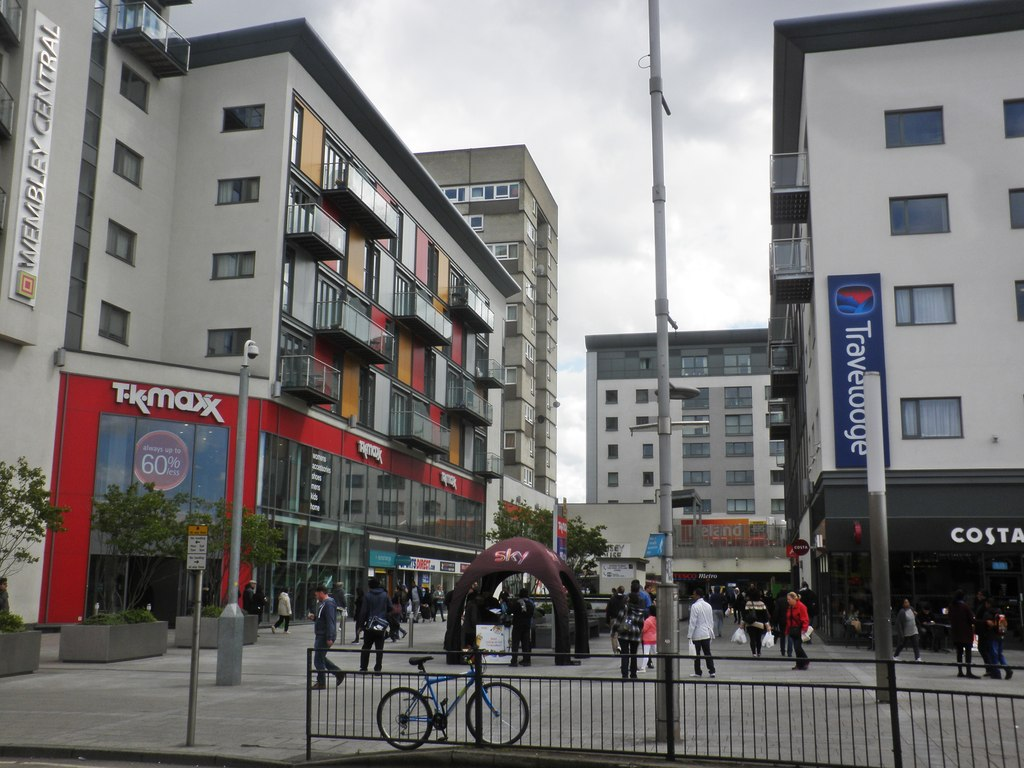
Central Square during vacancy in 2006 (left) and in 2015 (right) after regeneration

The town's regeneration is one of the major development projects in London in the early 21st century, as specified in the London Plan published by the Mayor of London Ken Livingstone in 2004. A shopping plaza along High Road, an attractive shopping district in the 1950s, suffered slow decline by the 1980s and was therefore poorly maintained. Its Marks & Spencer department store closed in 2005 after 71 years trading.

In a bid to reverse Wembley's fortunes, in the mid-2000s plans were created and approved to completely regenerate the place, carried out by construction company St. Modwen. The first phase, including construction of eighty-five homes, reconstruction of the plaza as a new public square and opening of new retail units including a TK Maxx, was completed in 2009. The rest was completed in phases until 2015 after nine years' time, with additional retail and housing units. The local Argos store also moved to a new unit in the redeveloped Central Square.

Purpose-built Brent Civic Centre near the stadium was completed in 2013, with all Brent administration moving to this complex. As a result, other offices were closed. The Chesterfield House block on Park Lane that was used as council offices, built in the 1960s replacing a Methodist church that moved further down the road, was demolished in 2017 and replaced by 21 and 26 storey blocks of apartments. Brent House, an office complex on High Road, was sold by the council sold Brent House to a developer called Henley Homes who demolished the building and also replaced it with residential apartments. Mahatma Gandhi House on Wembley Hill Road, another council office block, was also sold off. The listed Brent Town Hall was also disposed and became a French school, Lycée International de Londres Winston Churchill.

The regeneration project is focused on the "Wembley Park" site which includes Wembley Stadium and Wembley Arena, about a mile northeast from Wembley town centre. The Original Wembley Stadium closed in October 2000 and was demolished in 2003. The new Wembley stadium was designed by a consortium including engineering consultant Mott MacDonald and built by the Australian firm Multiplex. It cost £798 million and opened in 2007. Grade II-listed Wembley Arena, now the SSE Arena, has been sensitively refurbished in keeping with its Art Deco style. In 2004, Brent Council approved a mixed use plan by Buro Happold for the development of 55 acres (223,000 m^{2}) adjacent to the stadium, which was presented by Quintain Limited.

== Governance ==
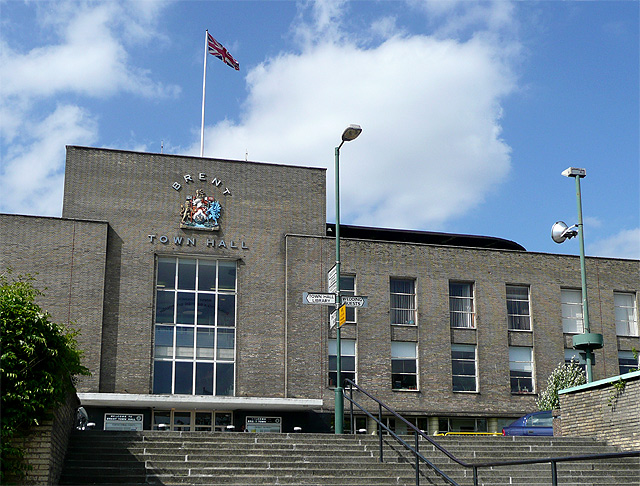
Brent Town Hall was the headquarters of the Borough of Wembley (1940-1965) and Brent (1965-2013).

Wembley falls within the UK Parliament constituency of Brent West, currently represented by Barry Gardiner MP (Labour). It falls within the London Assembly constituency of Brent and Harrow.

Wembley formed part of the large ancient parish of Harrow on the Hill in the Gore hundred of Middlesex. In 1894 Wembley was split from Harrow, creating a new parish and urban district. It included Alperton, Preston, North Wembley, South Kenton, Tokyngton, Sudbury, Wembley Park and Northwick Park. The urban district included the neighbouring parish of Kingsbury until 1901 and again from 1934.

In 1937 it was incorporated as the Municipal Borough of Wembley. Wembley Town Hall on Forty Lane, built in 1938, became Brent Town Hall when the municipal boroughs of Wembley and Willesden were amalgamated in 1965 to form the London Borough of Brent and transferred to Greater London.

=== Willesden merger and split proposal ===
Brent proved to be one of the more unpopular of the mergers occurring during the creation of the modern London boroughs. Reasons for this included the limited road links between the two main areas of Wembley and Willesden (with the A4088 and A404 Harrow Road, the only major road links across the Brent valley boundary), the lack of a focal point or 'heart' for the borough and the contrasting characteristics; with Willesden more inner-city in nature, and Wembley more suburban. Widening schemes for the North Circular Road, which passed along the Brent valley, close to the boundary between the two, increased this sense of separation. The clash quickly turned political amid the plans to build Chalkhill Estate, as Wembley was Conservative while Willesden was Labour; the balance of power between the two parties contributed to the borough council becoming a byword for polarised politics.

The unpopularity persisted and in 1989 more than ten thousand people signed a petition calling for Wembley to regain its independence or else join with the London Borough of Harrow with which it had historic administrative links, had better transport integration and had shared common suburban interests. The 1994, the Boundary Commission considered this, and other requests, considering a wide range of options including restoring independence to the districts, or joining them to different neighbouring boroughs – an option the Commission preferred.

Wembley and Harrow were felt to be a natural match, and the London Borough of Harrow supported these proposals and called for a boundary rationalisation with Barnet so that the A5 Road (Watling Street) formed the enlarged borough's entire eastern boundary. Willesden was harder to satisfactorily match with a neighbour, with Ealing considered the most natural choice, the main problem being the lack of a focal point, with the industrial areas of Park Royal, Old Oak Common and North Acton forming a relatively ill-connected barrier between the two. The Commission concluded that there was insufficient justification for the disruption caused by the changes, and that such changes should only be considered during a comprehensive review of London's boundaries.

== Geography ==
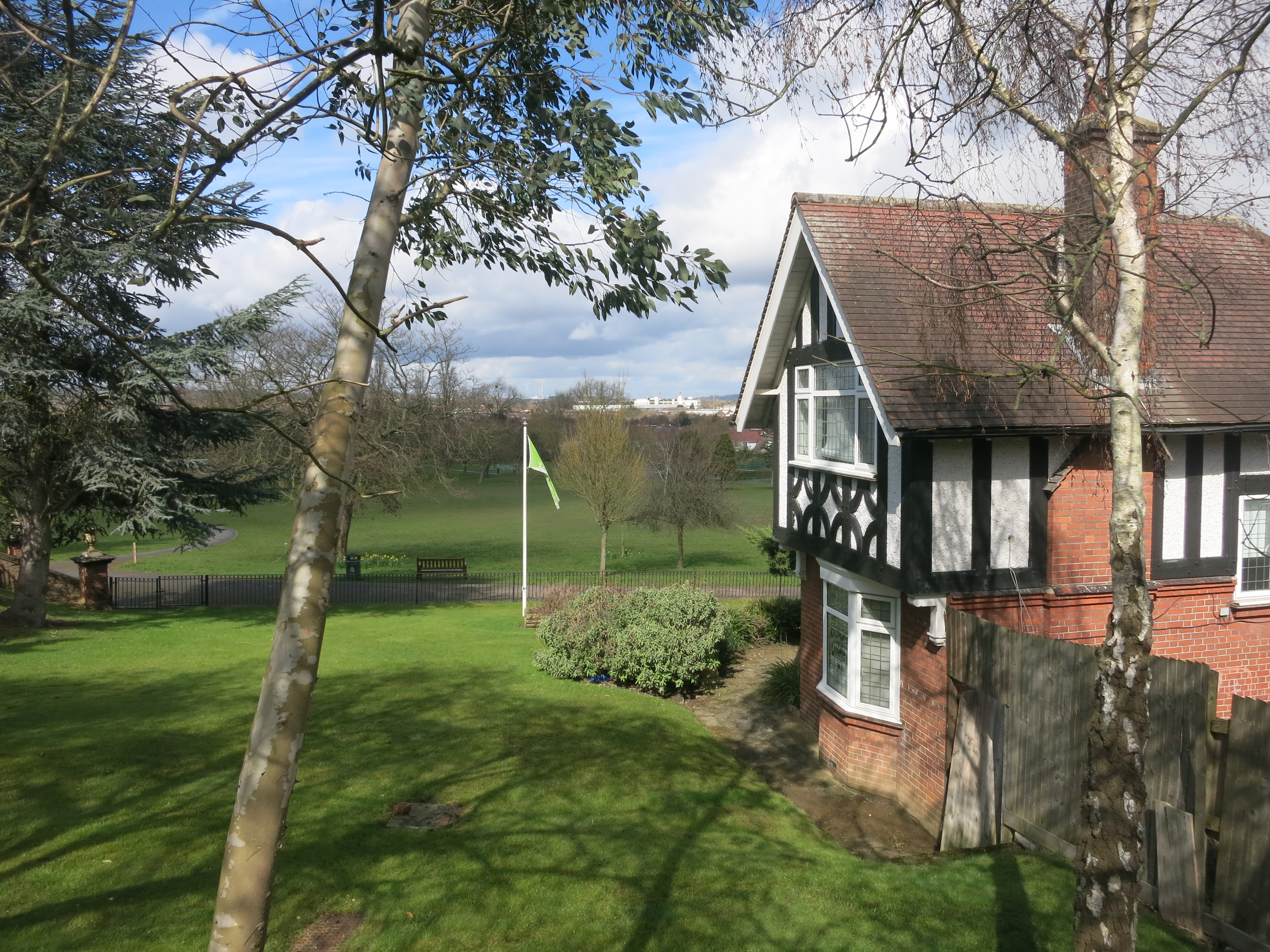
A house at King Edward VII Park, Wembley

Until the nineteenth century, Wembley was rural. In broadest terms Wembley has eight main green spaces, all but the golf course being public (no farms or private parks exist). The formal five are King Edward VII Park, set out in 1914 slightly north of the centre (10.5 hectares), Barham Park (10.5 hectares), One Tree Hill Park, Sudbury Green and Brent River Park / Tokyngton Recreation Ground (20.26 hectares) has been restored, returning the river to a more natural course. The informal three are Horsenden Hill, Vale Farm sports ground (30 hectares) and partly horse-grazed Barn Hill (19.9 hectares), east of which is its Kingsbury continuation: Fryent Country Park.

Sudbury Golf Course abuts the Paddington Arm of the Grand Union Canal, with a towpath running into central London. Sudbury Squash and Tennis Club has outdoor tennis courts, an indoor squash court, and a clubhouse. Wembley is a short distance away from the Welsh Harp reservoir and open space, created in the early 19th century by damming the River Brent to provide water for the Grand Union Canal.

Wembley is made up of six wards: Wembley Central, Alperton, Tokyngton, Barnhill, Preston and Sudbury. The town takes up the south-western quarter of the borough of Brent, being west of Harlesden and Willesden and south of Kenton. It is also east of Greenford and Northolt in the neighbouring London Borough of Ealing. The area is identified in the Mayor of London's London Plan as one of thirty-five major centres in Greater London. Wembley is part of both HA0 and HA9 post codes, and has its own post town.

== Demographics ==
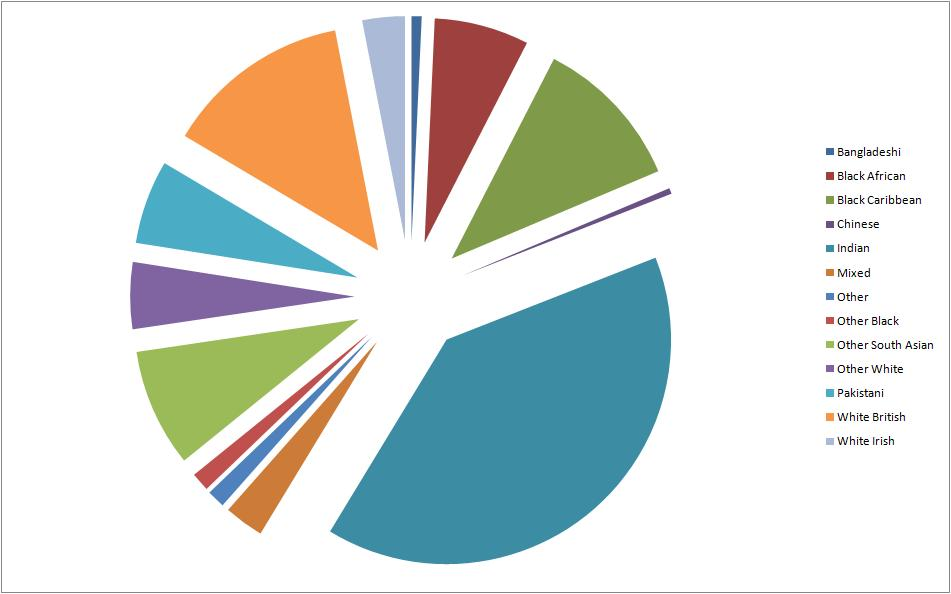
A pie chart showing the ethnic makeup of central Wembley in 2001

Wembley is known for its high degree of ethnic and religious diversity, and the population includes a large number of people of Asian, Afro-Caribbean and Eastern European origin. According to the 1991 census, 49.2% of the Wembley Central ward identified themselves as Asian (39% Indian). The ward along with neighbouring Tokyngton (eastern Wembley) and Alperton were in the top 10 most diverse in London. In the 2001 census, 78.6% of the ward identified themselves as being of black or minority ethnic (BME) groups. The White British population of Wembley Central (792 people, 5.3% of the population) in the 2011 census makes it the sixth least White British ward in London (seventh in the country). Other ethnicities include 7.0% Other White, 66.2% Asian (46.2% Indian), and 13.9% Black. In 2011, 86% of Wembley Central ward was of BAME background, which is the highest in Brent and 5th highest in Greater London. In Wembley the lowest BAME ward was Northwick Park, 68.8%.

The 2011 census also showed that, in the Wembley Central ward, the unemployment rate stood at 5.3%. Of the 4,380 households, 2,065 of the properties were tenure owned, 1,469 was privately rented and 684 was socially rented from the council. The largest religion was Hinduism (45%) followed by Christianity (25%). The median age was 32. By far the most spoken foreign language was Gujarati. Wembley Central only covers Wembley town centre and the whole district is represented by five other wards.

There are varying levels of social deprivation in the area. Places such as the central area and Chalkhill have had relatively high deprivation, with the latter having been troubled for a long time. In more recent years, regeneration has helped these areas fare better albeit with a higher general cost of living. Some parts of the town meanwhile are among the least deprived in the borough, especially Barn Hill estate and North Wembley's Sudbury Court Estate.

== Media ==
Local news in Wembley is provided by the Brent & Kilburn Times and the Harrow Times in print and online forms.

== Economy ==
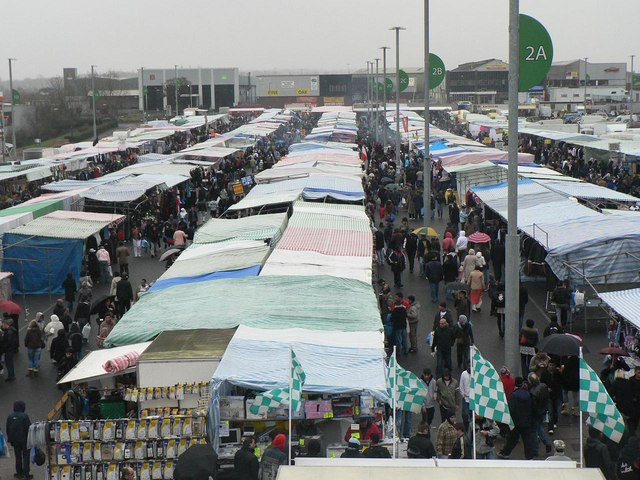
The former Sunday Market traded at the stadium car park for 41 years.

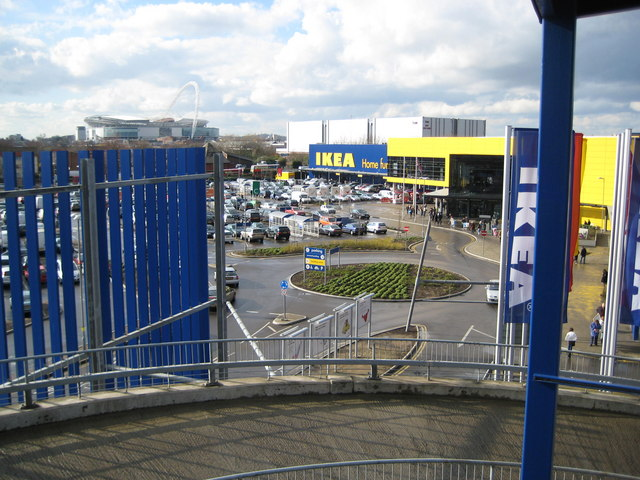
Wembley IKEA store, Brent Park retail area

The main shopping area was generally centred on Wembley High Road, Central Square, and Ealing Road. Unlike typical British high streets Wembley does not have a town centre network or pedestrianised high streets, with almost all commercial high street businesses along a 1000-yard stretch of road (High Road). In 1971 the High Road was seen as being the 11th best place to shop in London. However, it had fallen to 24th place by 1987. Ealing Road remains important as a centre of South Asian jewellery and gold shops, attracting people from as far afield as Leicester, but otherwise the focus of shopping has shifted north and east to the more recent development of London Designer Outlet in Wembley Park, which is part of the Stadium's complex and also includes a fully pedestrianised street near the Stadium. The regenerations were co-funded by Brent Council to add an attractive shopping destination.

The Wembley Sunday Market was a popular market held weekly from the 1970s until 2014 and run by Wendy Fair Markets. The market was ousted by the landowners, Quintain, in favour of the London Designer Outlet development. The market was then set up at the former Unisys tower near Stonebridge Park station before it was closed within a year by the council citing traffic disruption.

IKEA Wembley is in the Brent Park retail area near North Circular Road, Neasden. It opened in 1988 and was the Swedish retailer's second store in the UK after the initial store in Warrington.

The Air France-KLM European Sales and Service Centre, which is a sales channel for 15 European countries, is in Brent Civic Centre in Wembley Park.

== Sport and leisure ==
Wembley has two local non-League football clubs, Wembley F.C. and South Kilburn F.C., that both play at Vale Farm stadium in nearby Sudbury. Nearby is Vale Farm Sports Centre.

There once were two golf clubs in Wembley. Wembley Golf Club, founded in 1896, was situated north of the Metropolitan Railway line in what is now the Fryent Country Park. The club closed in the late 1920s. Wembley Park Golf Club was founded in 1912 in Sir Edward Watkin's Wembley Park pleasure gardens, improving on the 9-hole course that had opened, along with Watkin's Wembley Park, in 1896. The course itself became the site of the British Empire Exhibition.

The rugby union club, Wasps RFC, was based at Repton Avenue in Sudbury from the 1920s until 1996.

== Landmarks ==
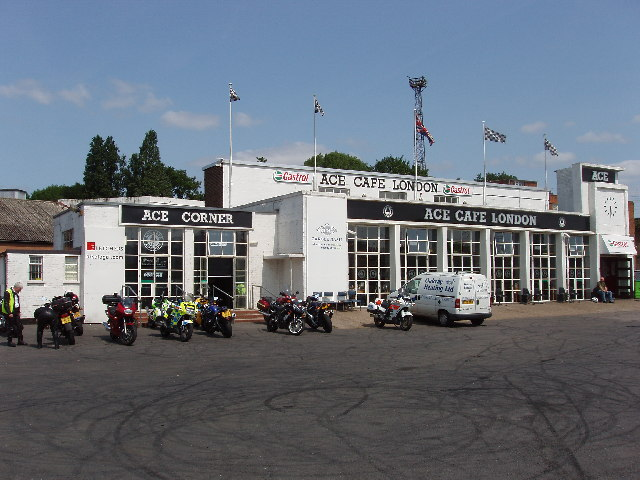
The famous Ace Cafe is on the North Circular near Wembley.

Apart from Wembley's earliest church, which is to St John the Evangelist of 1846 (see above), another listed building is the former Saint Andrew's Presbyterian Church on Ealing Road. It was designed by Thomas Collcutt and Stanley Hemp and built in 1904. Constructed mainly of brick, the design was influenced by the Arts and Crafts Movement. It was given Grade II category listing in 1993, shortly after it was purchased to become Central Mosque Wembley, having been vacant for fifteen years. To the south on Ealing Road is the Shree Sanatan Hindu Mandir, a major mandir opened in 2010.

The Catholic church of Saint Joseph, completed in 1957, was listed in 2016.

The Ace Cafe is unusually a transport café, opened in 1938 and re-opening in 1997 after decades of closure. This venue has been used to hold and plan car and bike events by motoring enthusiasts, nationally and internationally.

Wembley Point, formerly Station House, is a 21-storey building next to Stonebridge Park station. It was Brent's first skyscraper, built in 1965, and is visible from a radius of several miles. The building has had various uses, including partly as a gym and offices.

Wembley's only English Heritage blue plaque is on Forty Lane, commemorating the comedian and entertainer Arthur Lucan.

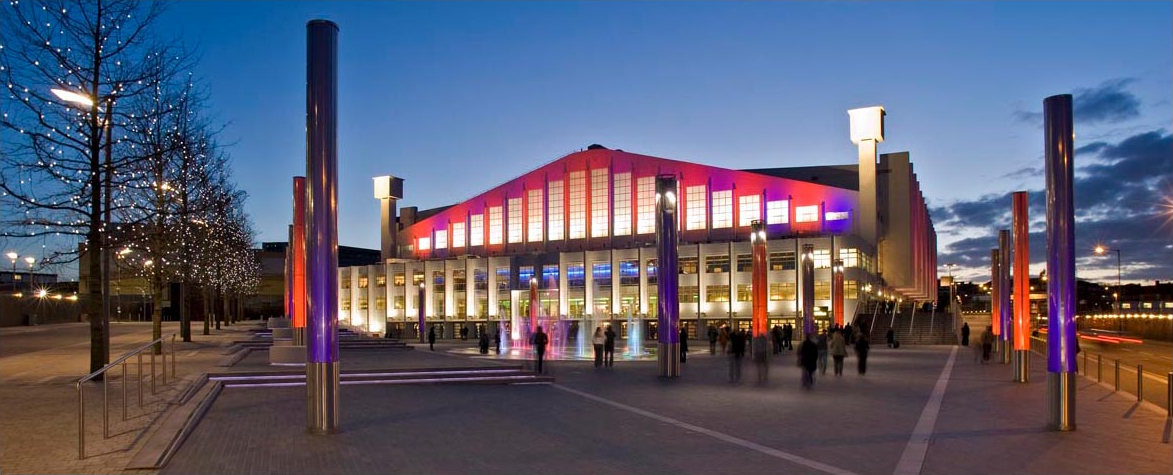
The SSE Arena concert venue opened in 1934, originally as a swimming pool.

The London Growth Plan identified Wembley as one of London's Internationally Significant Visitor Destinations. The prime landmark is Wembley Stadium, rebuilt 2003–07 at a cost of £827 million, which is approached via the White Horse Bridge designed by the London Eye architects. About half of the stadium's width northwest is the SSE Arena, a Grade II-listed concert venue built in 1934 as the Empire Pool, a multi-use facility built for the 2nd Empire Games and much renovated. The former Wembley (later Brent) Town Hall is likewise listed on Barn Hill remotely facing Wembley Stadium; it has now been refurbished as a French school, the Lycée International de Londres Winston Churchill. The London Borough of Brent's council chamber and main offices occupy Brent Civic Centre, Engineers Way, Wembley Park.

== Transport ==
=== Tube/train ===
Numbering as listed left of stations

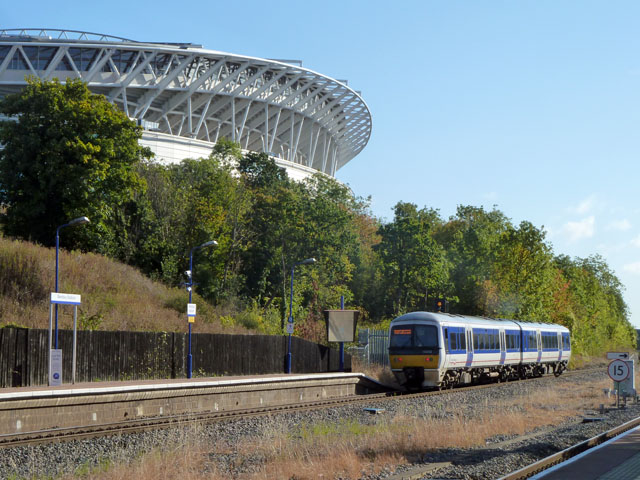
A Chiltern Railways Class 165 leaves Wembley Stadium station.

Stations in the town are:

1. Wembley Stadium (Chiltern Railways)
2. Wembley Central (Bakerloo line, Southern, West Midlands Trains and Watford DC line)
3. North Wembley (Bakerloo line and Watford DC line)
4. Wembley Park (Jubilee line and Metropolitan line)
5. Sudbury Town (Piccadilly line)
6. Preston Road (Metropolitan line)
7. Alperton (Piccadilly line)
8. Stonebridge Park (Bakerloo Line and Watford DC line)

=== Buses ===
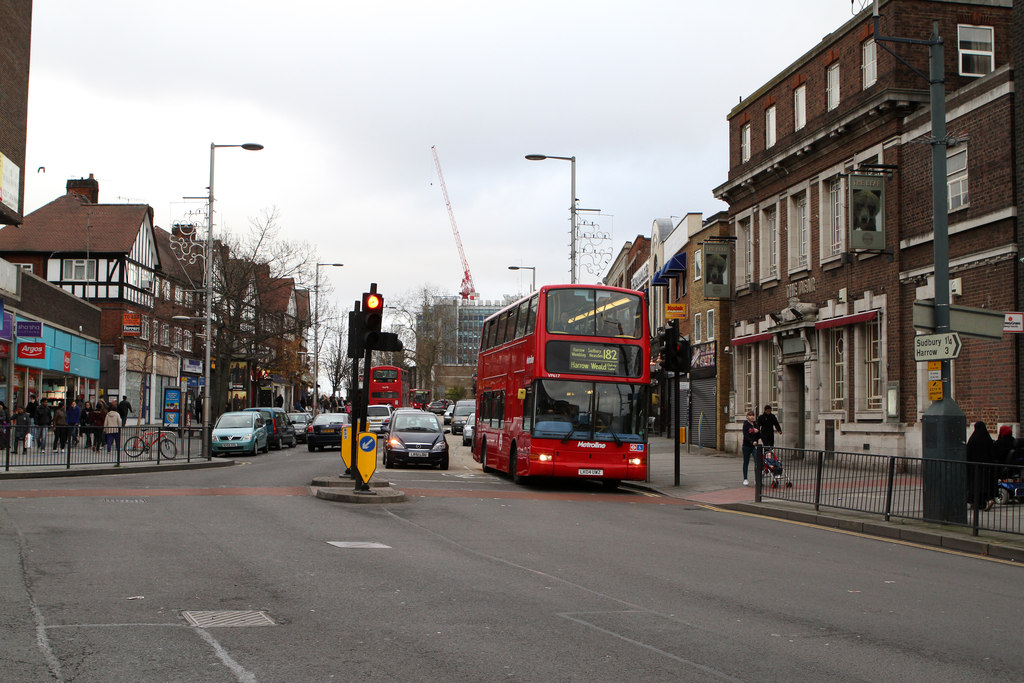
View of High Road near Park Lane; on the right is the town's former post office, now a public house

Wembley has numerous Transport for London bus routes that run through its centre on High Road, namely routes 18, 79, 83, 92, 182, 204, 223, 224, 297, 483, H17, and night route N18.

=== Canal ===
The Paddington Arm of the Grand Union Canal runs through the south of Wembley.

=== Road ===
Wembley lies very close to the A406 North Circular Road. The A404 Harrow Road passes through its centre. The town centre is served by three pay-and-display car parks.

=== SSE Arena access ===
Wembley Arena is served by Wembley Park station on the London Underground via Olympic Way, Wembley Stadium on the Chiltern Railways line from London Marylebone to Birmingham Snow Hill, and Wembley Central (walking via the White Horse Bridge). Bus route 92 stops directly outside.

The onsite parking facilities are close by, with a multistorey car park called Red Parking and a surface level car park on the eastern flank of the Stadium called Green Parking. Disabled parking is available at a reduced rate but on a first-come first-served basis.

== Notable people ==
- British Actor Ricardo P. Lloyd, grew up in Wembley
- Politician Luciana Berger (born 1981), The Independent Group MP, grew up in Wembley.
- Drummer Charlie Watts, founding member of The Rolling Stones, was born in Wembley.
- Engineer and Formula One aerodynamicist, John Barnard, who is credited with introducing the first semi-automatic gearbox, the first carbon fibre composite chassis and the "coke bottle" shape of the rear bodywork, was born in Wembley in 1946.
- Actor Riz Ahmed, star of satirist Chris Morris's black comedy Four Lions (2010), was born in Wembley. His TV comedy Bait was partially set there.
- Scientist John D Barrow, Professor of Mathematical Sciences at Cambridge University, cosmologist, Templeton prize winner and author of many popular science books and the award-winning play Infinities was born in Wembley in 1952 and attended Barham Primary School.
- Diana Churchill (actress), (born Wembley, 1913)
- Composer Peter Fribbins was born, and grew up, in Wembley.
- British ambassador to Israel Matthew Gould grew up in Wembley.
- Astrologer Russell Grant lived in Wembley.
- Scholar Vivian H. H. Green (1915–2005), the model for author John le Carré's spymaster character George Smiley, was born in Wembley.
- Actor and comedian Lenny Henry lived in Wembley.
- Actor and musician Gary Holton (1952–1985), Wayne in Auf Wiedersehen, Pet and frontman of Heavy Metal Kids, lived in Wembley at the time of his death.
- Footballers Raheem Sterling, Jerel Ifil, and Jerome Thomas lived in Wembley.
- Musician John Lingwood, drummer in Manfred Mann's Earth Band, was born in Wembley.
- The actor Arthur Lucan (Arthur Towle), famous for his performances as 'Old Mother Riley', lived at 11 Forty Lane, Wembley, as did his wife and co-star, Catherine 'Kitty' McShane.
- Rock drummer Keith Moon of The Who, was born in Wembley.
- Singer Maxine Nightingale, best known for her soul hit records in the 1970s, was born in Wembley.
- Figure-skater Valda Osborn was born in Wembley.
- Nurse, journalist, broadcaster and novelist Claire Rayner lived in Wembley.
- Dancer, author, musician and bandleader Victor Silvester was the second son of J. W. P. Silvester, vicar of St. John the Evangelist Anglican church, Wembley.
- Chunkz- youtuber and part of Beta squad, was born in wembley and attended wembley high technology college
- Musician Harvey Shield grew up in Wembley.
- Mick Whelan, head of the ASLEF trade union, lives in Wembley.
- Sir Henry Cooper, British Heavyweight Champion, after the key bout with Cassius Clay, 1963, retired to the town of the venue; he opened a greengrocer's shop at the top of Ealing Road, Wembley.

== See also ==
- Wembley Point Woman, unidentified decedent found at the base of the Wembley Point tower in 2004

== Gallery ==
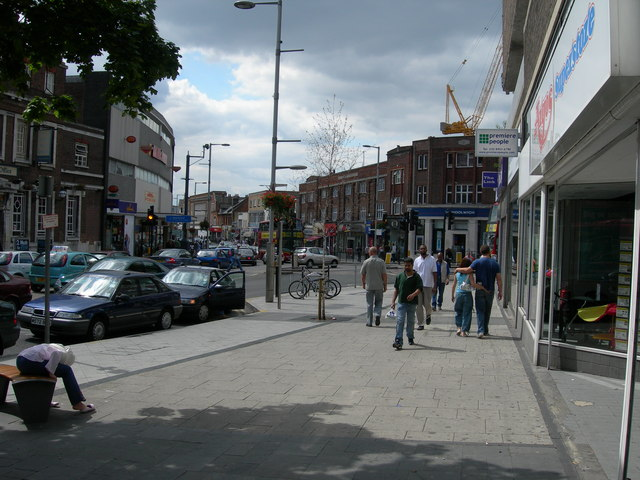
High Road, looking west towards the junction with Park Lane

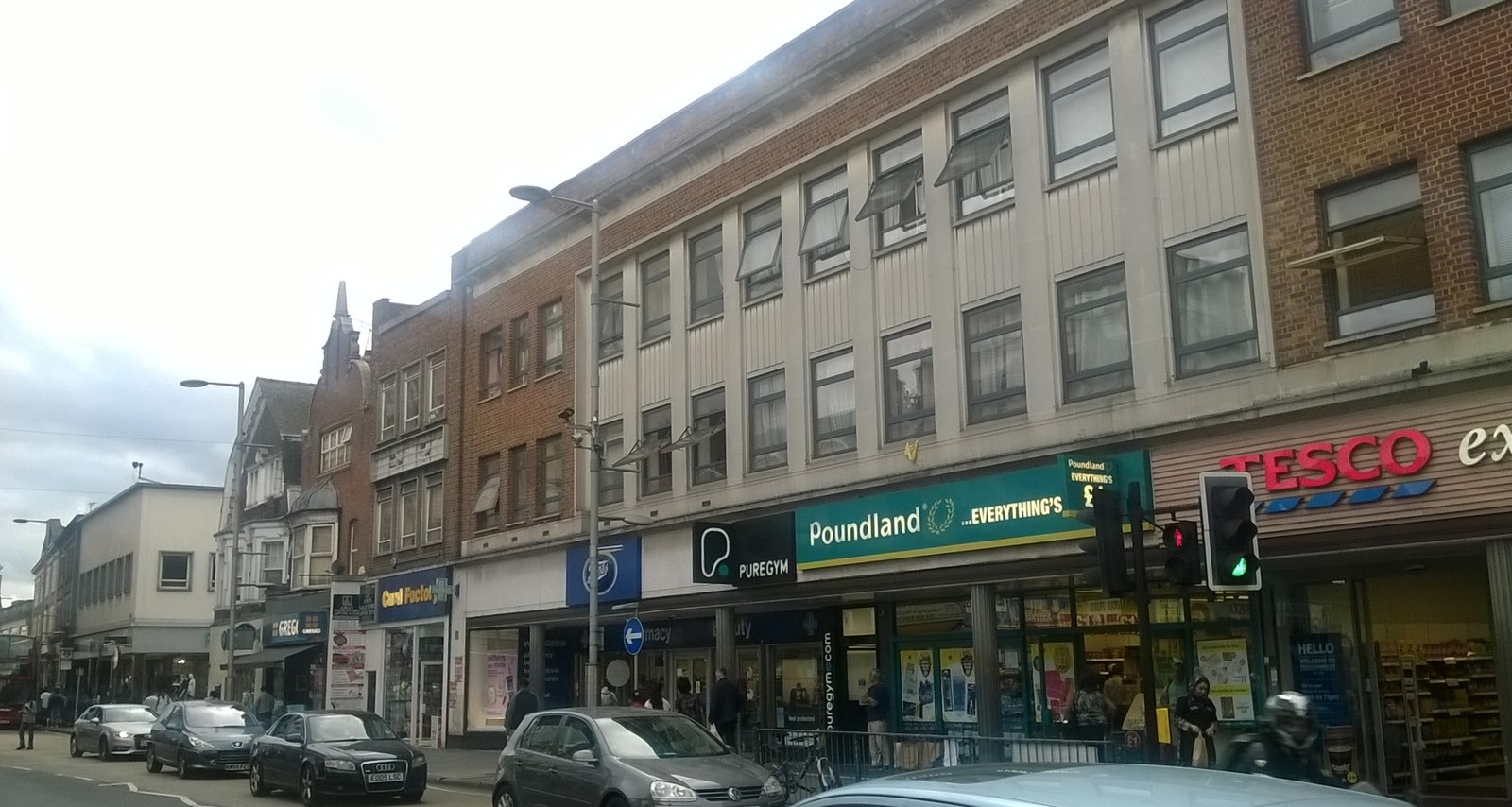
Building built as Marks and Spencer outlet, mainly divided in four vertically

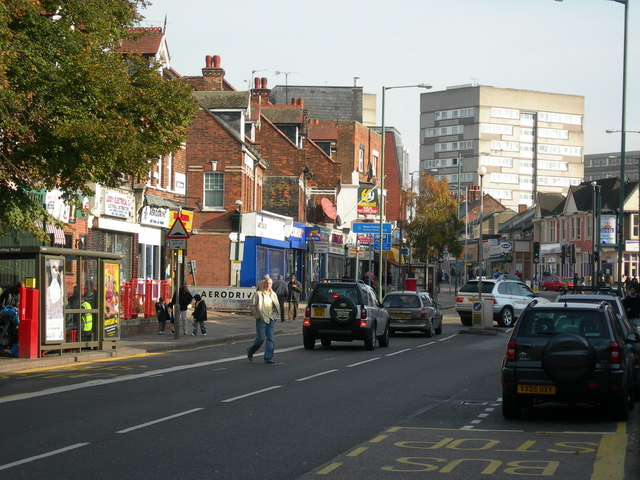
Western section of High Road, looking east

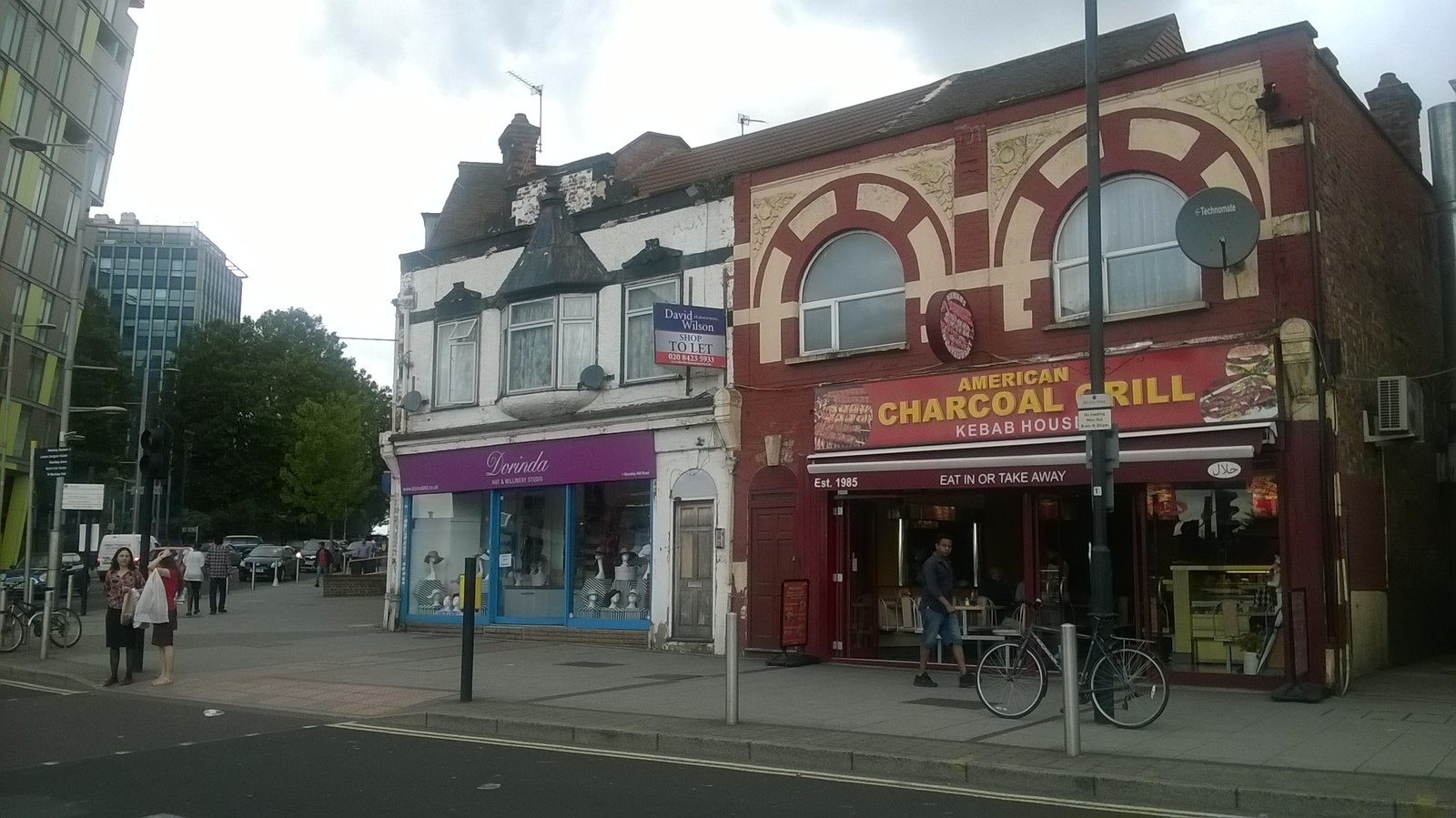
Shops near the High Road/Wembley Hill Road junction

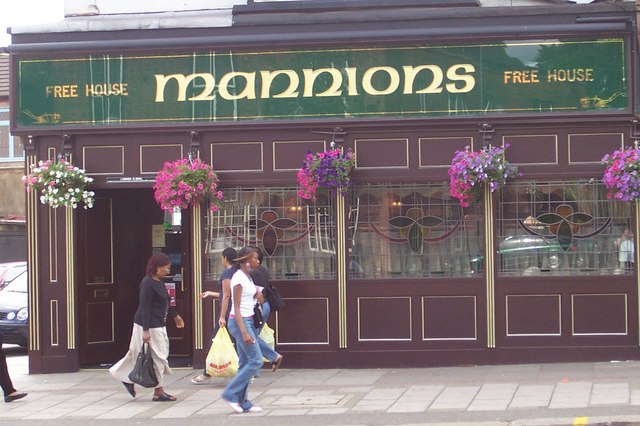
Mannions Free House, Irish pub, on High Road

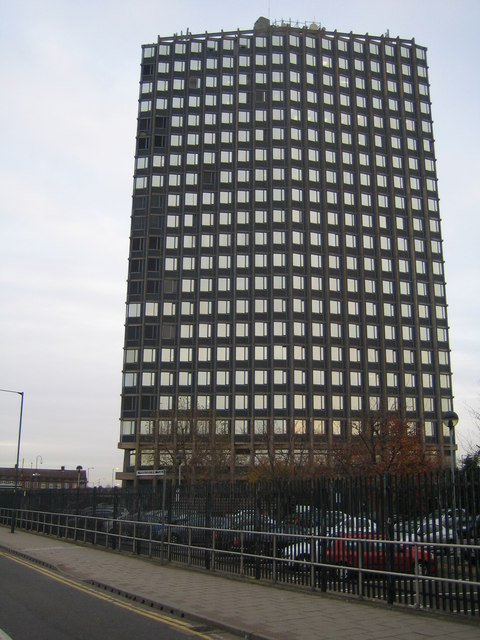
Wembley Point skyscraper, next to the North Circular Road

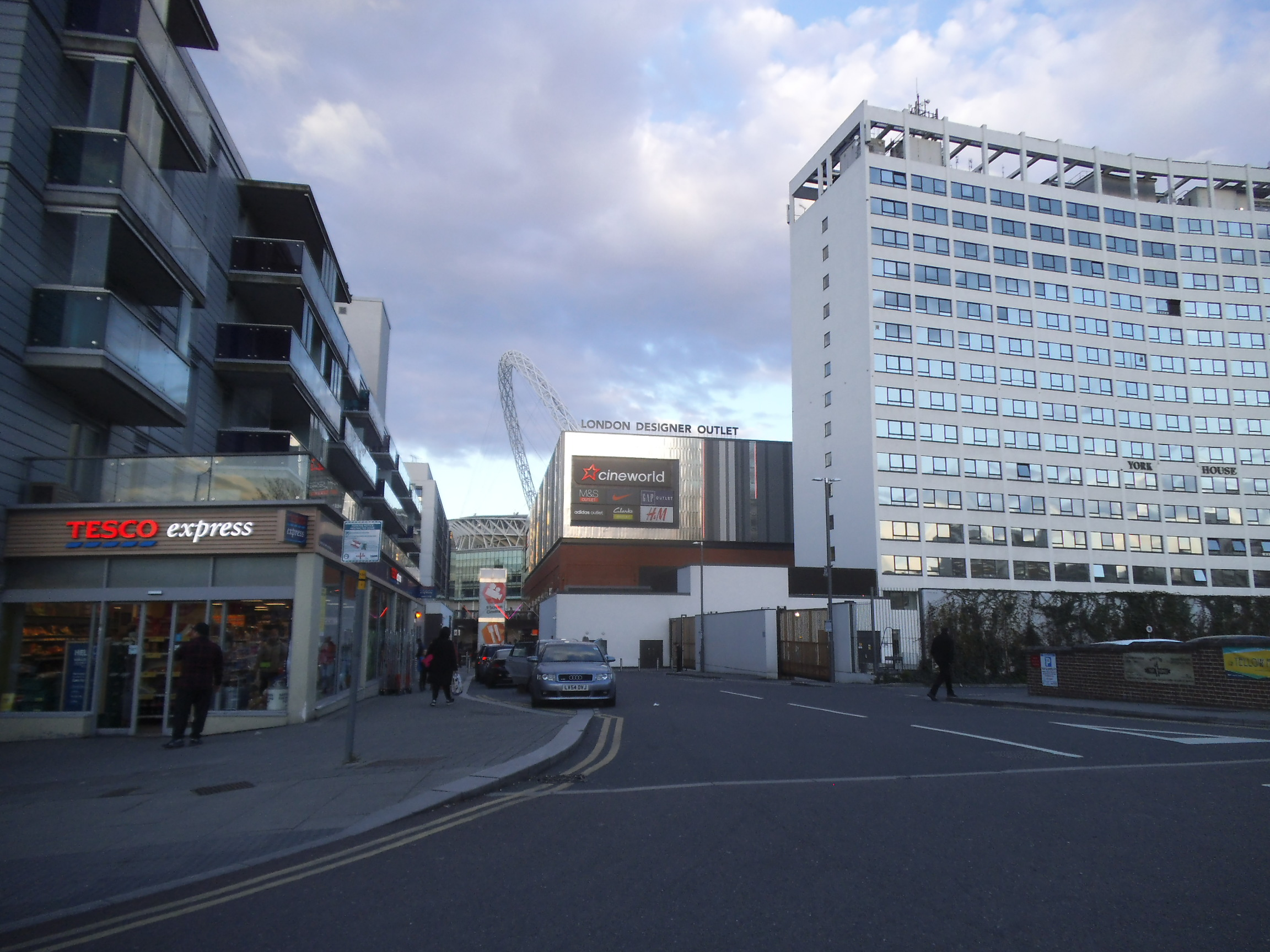
York House and London Designer Outlet

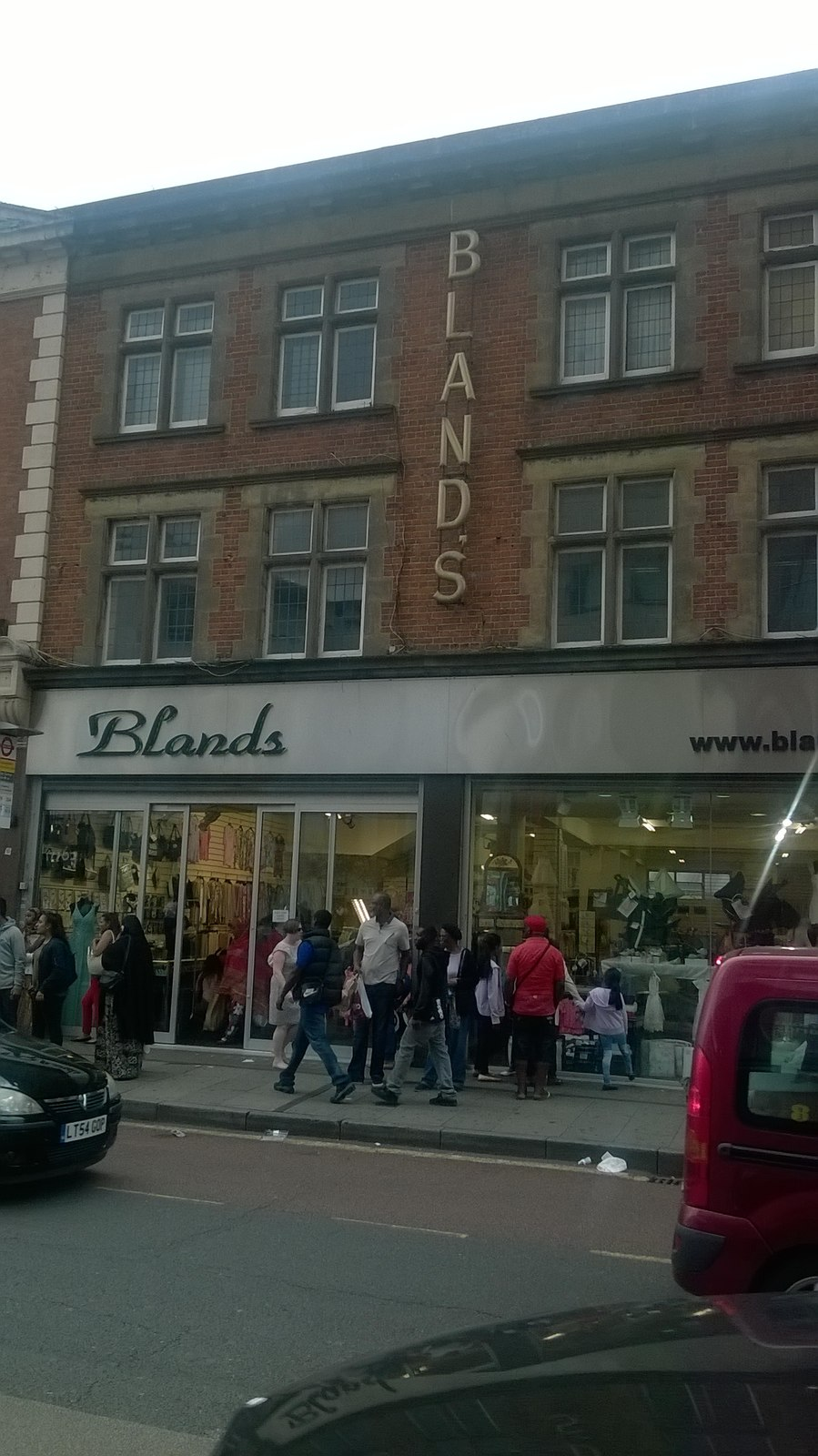
Bland's, a small department store on High Road that traded from 1911 to 2017

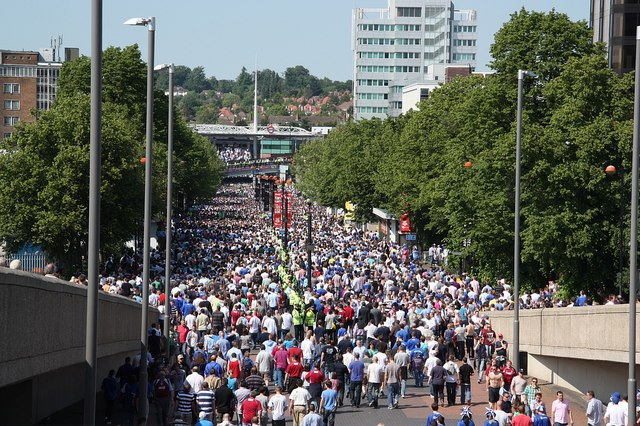
Wembley Way connects, for pedestrians, Wembley Park Station and Wembley Stadium

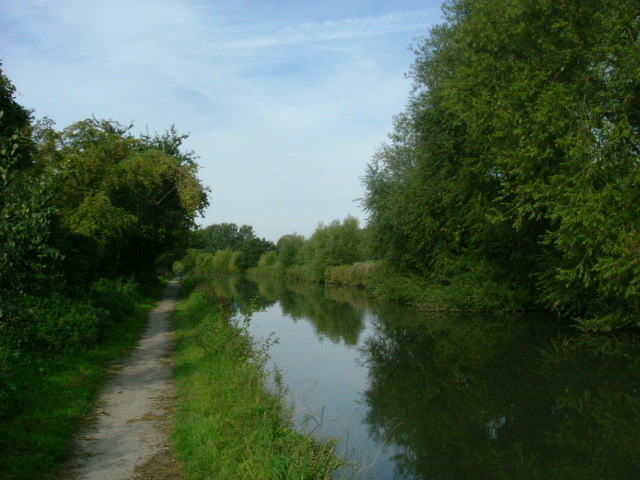
Grand Union Canal Towpath, by Sudbury Golf Course

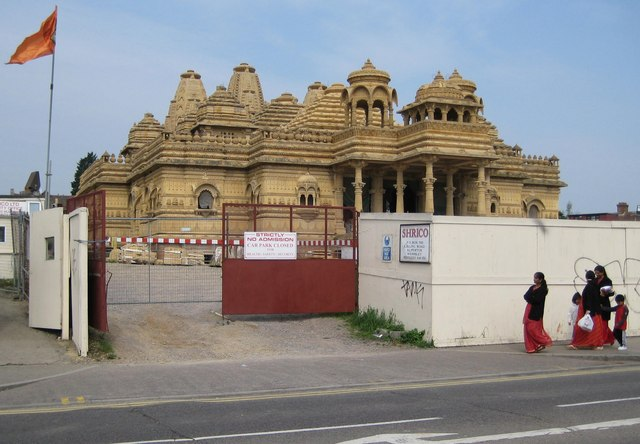
Shree Sanatan Hindu Mandir

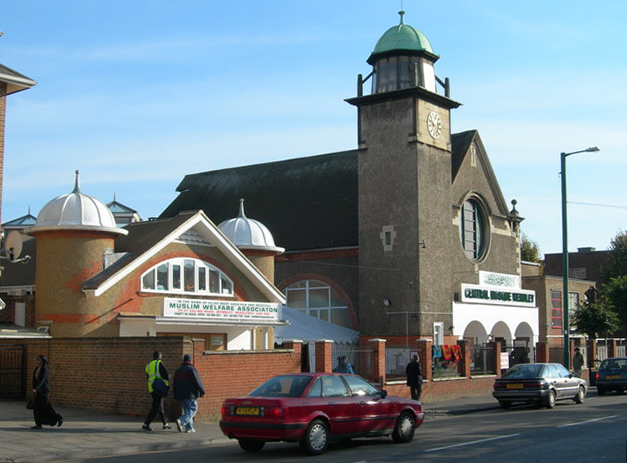
Central Mosque, Wembley

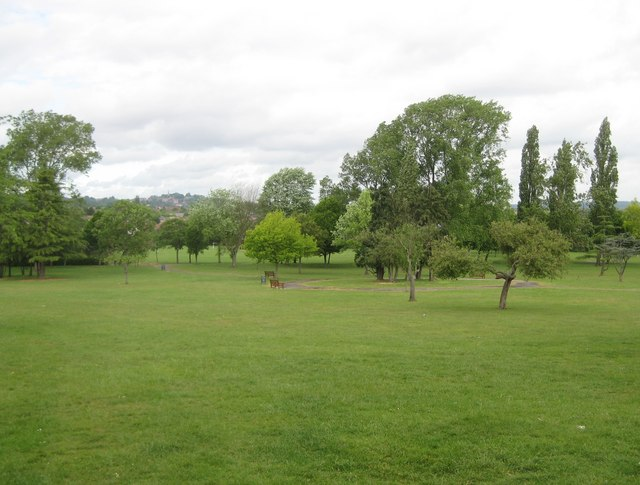
King Edward VII Park

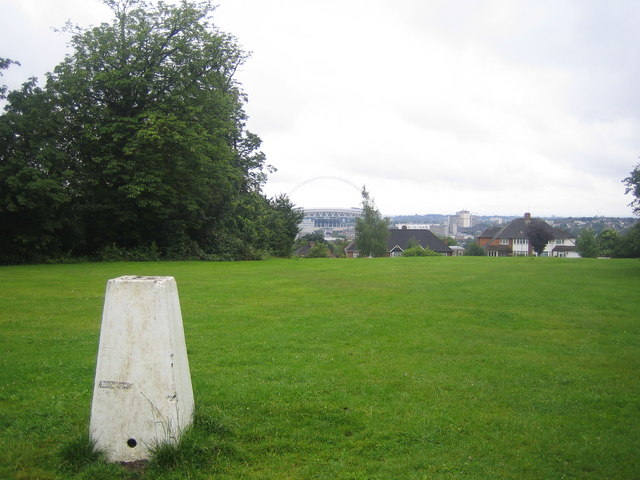
Barn Hill public open space
