= Leathley Mill =

Mill in Leathley, North Yorkshire, England

Coordinates: 53°55′32″N 1°39′00″W

Leathley Mill is a historic building in Leathley, a village in North Yorkshire, in England.

The watermill was built in the mid 18th century to grind corn. It lies on the River Washburn, alongside the contemporary miller's house. The mill was altered in the 19th century, and was grade II* listed in 1966. Later in the century, it was converted into housing.

The mill is built of gritstone with a corrugated asbestos roof. It has a T-shaped plan, consisting of a three-storey main range, and a two-storey range at right angles. The main range contains a wagon entrance and an arched mill entrance to the right. At the rear is an outshut with a corrugated iron roof over the mill race and an undershot wood and iron waterwheel. The well-preserved interior includes the original floors and stairs, trap doors, corn bins, and the main shaft and cogs of the waterwheel.

The mill house is grade II listed. It is built of gritstone, with quoins, and a stone slate roof with shaped kneelers and stone coping. The doorway is in the centre, and the windows are recessed, with flat-faced mullions and plain surrounds.

== See also ==
- Grade II* listed buildings in North Yorkshire (district)
- Listed buildings in Leathley
