= Harrow Observer =

Weekly tabloid newspaper reporting on the London Borough of Harrow

- Type: Weekly newspaper
- Launched: 1855; 171 years ago
- Ceased publication: 2014; 12 years ago
- Language: English
- Headquarters: Uxbridge, England (2009–2014)
- Country: North West London, England, United Kingdom
- Circulation: 9,017 (as of 2008; 18 years ago)
- ISSN: 0964-3168
- Website: harrowobserver.co.uk

The Harrow Observer was a paid-for local weekly tabloid newspaper covering stories from the London Borough of Harrow. It had separate editions for Pinner, Harrow, Stanmore and Wembley & Willesden. The former newspaper titles were retained by its owners, Reach plc, as branding for the Harrow, Pinner and Wembley sections of their getwestlondon news website, which is now MyLondon.

== History ==
The Harrow Observer has documented a variety of events over the years, from rail crashes to royal visits, court cases to council estates. It began life as the four-page, two pence The Harrow Monthly Gazette and General Advertiser. The paper first hit newsstands on 1 April 1855, fulfilling the dream of local estate agent and civic leader William Winkley Junior, who published it from a small shop in High Street, Harrow on the Hill. By the 1880s, the publication had grown into a broadsheet and the cover price had risen by half a penny.

The Gazette lost its monopoly in April 1895 when non-conformist Robert A Smith launched the alternative Wealdstone, Harrow and Wembley Observer. In 1921, Oswald Mosley, then MP for Harrow, took over as editor of the Harrow Observer and under his command the two rivals merged. After several changes of owner, the newspaper came into the hands of Westminster Press, under whose tenure a 20-page midweek edition was published in 1967. The sister free paper, the Leader series, came into existence in 1983 and three years later the Harrow Observer switched from a broadsheet to tabloid format.

A large swathe of the photographic negatives archive was destroyed in a fire in 1992 and dark room developing became extinct when digital photography was introduced in 1998. Trinity Mirror, the UK’s largest publisher, acquired the title in 2002 after a takeover and the editorial team moved to their sixth home in Lyon Road, Harrow. Its weekly circulation in early 2008 was recorded as 9,017.

Due to declines in the print market, the title became a digital-only publication, and the print edition of the newspaper closed with its final publication on 18 December 2014. Its off-shoot paper Wembley & Willesden Observer was also closed down.

== See also ==
- Harrow Times
- Brent & Kilburn Times
- Watford Observer
- Hillingdon & Uxbridge Times
- Edgware & Mill Hill Times
