= Hampshire Chronicle =

English weekly newspaper published in Hampshire from 1772

- Front page, 7 October 2010
- Type: Weekly newspaper
- Owner: Newsquest
- Founder: James Linden
- Founded: 1772
- Circulation: 4,481 (as of 2023)
- Website: hampshirechronicle.co.uk

The Hampshire Chronicle is a local newspaper based in Winchester, Hampshire, England. The first edition was published on 24 August 1772, making it now one of the oldest still-operating publications in England.

== History ==
The paper was founded by James Linden and was originally based in Southampton, moving to Winchester in 1778. From 1807 until 2004, its offices were at 57 High Street, Winchester. It is now based at 5 Upper Brook Street, Winchester.

For many years the paper included national and international news, before trains allowed London papers to reach Hampshire. It now concentrates on news from Winchester and central Hampshire.

The paper has been published every week without fail since the first week. Publication days have varied, moving from Monday to Saturday in 1844, then to Friday in the 1970s and to Thursday in November 2005.

Photographs became a regular feature of the paper in the 1940s.

The paper covers news, advertising and sport from Winchester and the surrounding districts.

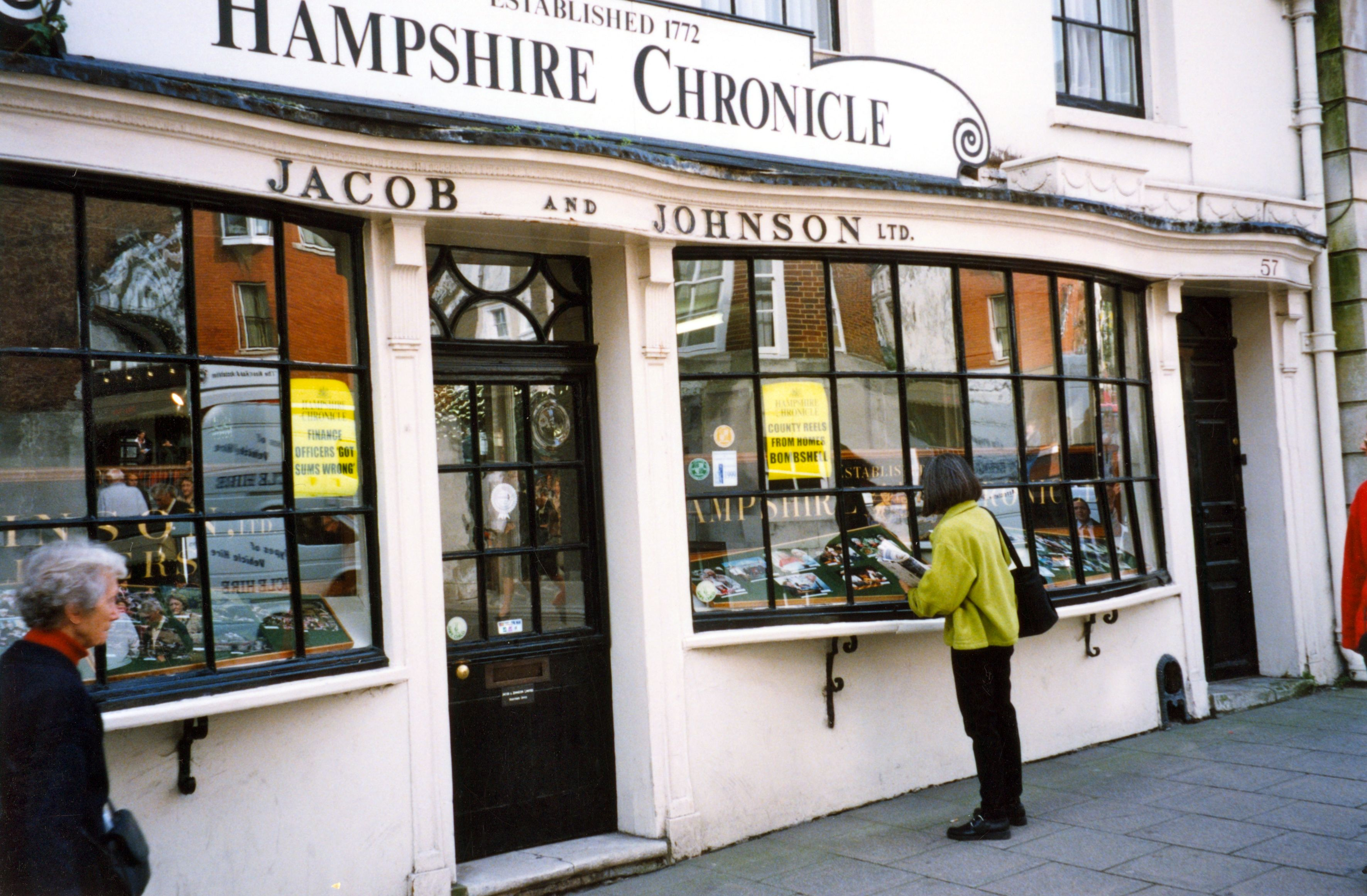
Exterior of Chronicle office, 1999

Until 19 April 1991, the Hampshire Chronicle was printed at its own offices, 57 High Street Winchester. From the following week, it was printed at Newsquest's Print Centre, in Test Lane, Redbridge, Southampton, until this closed and print production moved to Newsquest's Weymouth print centre.

The Hampshire Chronicle is owned by Newsquest, which is the second largest publisher of regional and local newspapers in the UK, and is itself part of the US group Gannett.

Sister newspapers in the area include the Romsey Advertiser, Southern Daily Echo, Basingstoke Gazette, Andover Advertiser, and the Salisbury Journal.

Its archives can be found at the Hampshire Record Office, run by Hampshire County Council, in Winchester.
