= Listed buildings in Leathley =

Leathley is a civil parish in the county of North Yorkshire, England. It contains 21 listed buildings that are recorded in the National Heritage List for England. Of these, one is listed at Grade I, the highest of the three grades, two are at Grade II*, the middle grade, and the others are at Grade II, the lowest grade. The parish contains the village of Leathley and the surrounding countryside. Most of the listed buildings are houses and associated structures, and the others include two churches, a mounting block, a set of stocks, a mill and mill house, a bridge, a group of almshouses, a stand-pipe, three mileposts and a telephone kiosk.

== Key ==
Grade	Criteria
I	Buildings of exceptional interest, sometimes considered to be internationally important
II*	Particularly important buildings of more than special interest
II	Buildings of national importance and special interest

== Buildings ==
Name and location	Photograph	Date	Notes	Grade
St Oswald's Church; 53.91874°N 1.64843°W		12th century	The church has been altered and extended through the centuries, including a restoration in 1869. The church is built in gritstone with a stone slat roof, and consists of a nave, north and south aisles, a south porch, a chancel with a north organ chamber and a south vestry, and a west tower. The tower is Norman, and has four stages. It is unbuttressed, and has quoins, slit windows in the middle stages, and above are round-arched bell openings and a pyramidal roof.	I
Manor House; 53.91687°N 1.64862°W	—	17th century	The house is in gritstone, with quoins, a moulded floor band, a coved eaves cornice, and a stone slate roof. There are two storeys and three bays. On the front is a gabled porch, and a doorway with a moulded surround. To the left of the doorway is a sash window, above it is a Venetian window, and the other windows are mullioned. In the right return is a doorway with a dated lintel.	II
Stocks; 53.91869°N 1.64805°W		17th century (possible)	The stocks are near the east gate of St Oswald's Church. They are in gritstone, and consist of two pillars and the lower rail intact. The left pillar is about 1.5 metres (4 ft 11 in) high, and has a square section, and a faceted ball finial. The right pillar is broken.	II
The Cottage; 53.92122°N 1.64273°W	—	17th century	The house is in gritstone, with quoins, and a stone slate roof with shaped kneelers and stone coping. There are two storeys and three bays. The doorway on the extreme left has a shallow-arched lintel, and elsewhere there are double-chamfered mullioned windows, some with hood moulds.	II
Ye Widgeons Roost; 53.91866°N 1.64899°W	—	17th century	The house is in gritstone, and has a stone slate roof with shaped kneelers and stone coping. There are two storeys, four bays, and a rear outshut. On the front is a porch, and the windows are mullioned.	II
Stables, Leathley Hall; 53.91670°N 1.64098°W	—	Early 18th century	The stable block is in gritstone, with chamfered quoins, a string course, an eaves band, and a hipped stone slate roof. There are two storeys and seven bays, the outer bays projecting as shallow wings. The ground floor has garage and stable doors, a blocked cross window, and sash windows. In the upper floor are two-light mullioned windows.	II
Leathley Hall; 53.91696°N 1.64132°W		Early to mid 18th century	The house is in gritstone, with chamfered quoins, a string course, and an M-shaped stone slate roof, hipped on the right and with stone coping on the left. There are two storeys, a double depth plan, and a front range of nine bays, the middle three bays projecting under a gable. In the centre are double doors with a fanlight, flanking columns and an open pediment. The windows are sashes in moulded architraves.	II
Archway and wall, Leathley Hall; 53.91746°N 1.63951°W		Early to mid 18th century	The archway is in stone, and has a round-arched head, single-block jambs, voussoirs, a large keystone and a cornice, and above it is a stone block. The flanking wall is in brick with stone coping. It is about 20 metres (66 ft) long, 3 metres (9.8 ft) high, and ramped up over the archway.	II
Corn Mill; 53.92566°N 1.64996°W	—	Mid 18th century	The mill is in gritstone with a corrugated asbestos roof. It has a T-shaped plan, consisting of a three-storey main range, and a two-storey range at right angles. The main range contains a wagon entrance and an arched mill entrance to the right. At the rear is an outshut with a corrugated iron roof over the mill race and an undershot wood and iron waterwheel.	II*
Fishpool Farm; 53.92326°N 1.64806°W	—	Mid 18th century	The house is in gritstone, with quoins, and a Westmorland slate roof with shaped kneelers and stone coping. There is a square plan, with two storeys and two bays. The central doorway has a plain surround, the windows in the ground floor are casements, and in the upper floor are mullioned windows.	II
Mounting block 53.91862°N 1.64810°W	—	18th century	The mounting block is near the east gate to St Oswald's Church. It is in gritstone, and has five steps on the left side and three on the right side. The left side is about 60 centimetres (24 in) above the ground.	II
Pool Bridge; 53.90520°N 1.63063°W	cntre	18th century	The bridge carries the A658 road over the River Wharfe. It is in sandstone, and consists of seven segmental arches, two over the river, and the others over the flanking ramps. On the east side are simple recessed arches and triangular cutwaters, and the west side has rusticated voussoirs and round-nosed cutwaters. Both sides have rectangular intermediate piers, a central canted pier, and cylindrical end piers with domed tops.	II
The Millhouse; 53.92535°N 1.64980°W	—	18th century	The house is in gritstone, with quoins, and a stone slate roof with shaped kneelers and stone coping. The doorway is in the centre, and the windows are recessed, with flat-faced mullions and plain surrounds.	II
Almshouses; 53.91874°N 1.64721°W		1769	A school and almshouses, later almshouses, in gritstone with a stone slate roof. In the centre is a two-storey two-bay block flanked by single-story four-bay wings. The central doorway has a moulded surround, a pulvinated frieze and a cornice, and it is flanked by sash windows in plain surrounds. Above it is a tablet with an inscription, and a large semicircular window with a plain surround and a sill band. The wings contain doorways with fanlights, and sash windows.	II
Methodist Church, wall, gate and steps 53.92028°N 1.64469°W		1826	The chapel is in gritstone with a hipped stone slate roof, and it has a square plan. The double doors and sash windows have plain surrounds, and above the doorway is an inscribed and dated plaque. To the south and east of the chapel are ramped retaining walls, containing a square-headed gateway and a door with decorative hinges. The gate is reached by three semicircular stone steps incorporating an iron boot scraper.	II*
Stand-pipe; 53.91830°N 1.64769°W		Early to mid 19th century	The stand-pipe is in cast iron and about 40 centimetres (16 in) stands above the ground. It consists of a fluted column with an animal's head finial to the spout, and a round fluted head with moulding and a bud finial.	II
Milepost, Leathley Lane; 53.91999°N 1.64833°W		19th century	The milepost on the east side of Leathley Lane (B6161 road), is in gritstone with a cast iron plate. It has a triangular plan and a rounded top, and is about 60 centimetres (24 in) high. The top is inscribed "Dudleyhill Killinghall & Harrogate Road" and "Leathley", on the left face is the distance to Killinghall, and on the right face to Bradford.	II
Milepost near Riffa Farm; 53.91228°N 1.62316°W		19th century	The milepost on the southeast side of the A658 road is in gritstone with a cast iron plate. It has a triangular plan and a rounded top, and is about 60 centimetres (24 in) high. The top is inscribed "Dudleyhill Killinghall & Harrogate Road" and "Leathley", on the left face is the distance to Bradford, and on the right face to Harrogate.	II
Milepost near junction with Harrogate Road; 53.90939°N 1.64048°W		19th century	The milepost on the south side of Leathley Lane (B6161 road), is in gritstone with a cast iron plate. It has a triangular plan and a rounded top, and is about 80 centimetres (31 in) high. The top is inscribed "Dudleyhill Killinghall & Harrogate Road" and "Leathley", on the left face is the distance to Killinghall, and on the right face to Bradford.	II
Leathley Lodge; 53.91370°N 1.64886°W		Mid to late 19th century	The lodge is in chamfered rusticated stone on a rock-faced rusticated plinth, with deep corbelled eaves, and a Westmorland slate roof. It is in cottage orné style, with one storey and an octagonal plan. The porch is gabled, and the windows are mullioned, with three lights and hood moulds.	II
Telephone kiosk 53.91881°N 1.64776°W		1935	The K6 type telephone kiosk was designed by Giles Gilbert Scott. Constructed in cast iron, it has a square plan and a dome, and there are three unperforated crowns in the top panels.	II
