= Little Chapel, Leathley =

Building in Leathley, North Yorkshire, England

Coordinates: 53°55′13″N 1°38′41″W

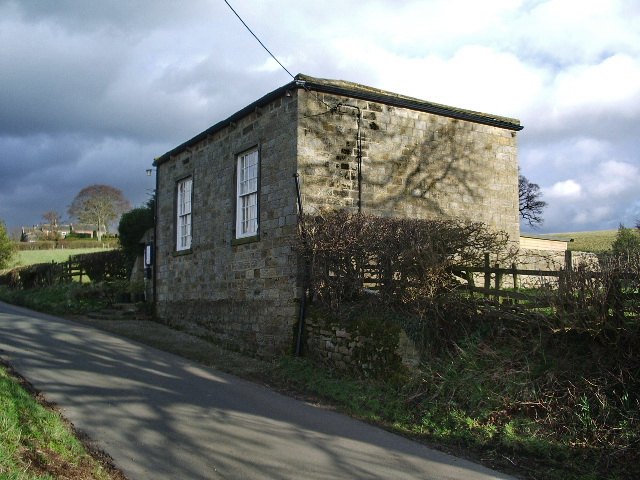
The building, in 2008

The Little Chapel is a historic building in Leathley, a village in North Yorkshire, in England.

The Wesleyan Methodist Church constructed the chapel in 1826. It could seat 114 worshippers, and by 1851 had more than 60 at a typical Sunday morning service. The doors were replaced and many of the windows altered in the 20th century. The building was grade II* listed in 1985. The chapel closed around the end of the century, and in 2003 it was converted into an observatory. In 2014, it was advertised for sale for £150,000 with the potential to convert it into a holiday let.

The chapel is built of gritstone with a hipped stone slate roof, and it has a square plan. The double doors and sash windows have plain surrounds, and above the doorway is an inscribed and dated plaque. To the south and east of the chapel are ramped retaining walls, containing a square-headed gateway and a door with decorative hinges. The gate is reached by three semicircular stone steps incorporating an iron boot scraper. Inside, the original stepped wooden pews survive, along with a wooden pulpit, communion rail, choir benches and panelling.

== See also ==
- Grade II* listed churches in North Yorkshire (district)
- Listed buildings in Leathley
