= Gazette & Observer =

The Gazette & Observer, in full the Ilkley, Wharfedale and Aireborough Gazette & Observer, was a weekly newspaper published by Wharfedale Newspapers of Ilkley, West Yorkshire, England, and part of the Newsquest group. It began publication on 10 February 2011 as a merger of the two previous local papers, the Ilkley Gazette and the Wharfedale & Airedale Observer. However, three months later, the paper was spun off into the two previous titles after customer dissatisfaction.

The paper covered the towns of Wharfedale and the upper Aire valley including Otley, Pool in Wharfedale, Leathley, Yeadon, Guiseley, Rawdon and Horsforth. The bulk of the newspaper was now produced in Ilkley and Bradford. Publication day was Thursday, and circulation was approximately 10,300, with a readership of almost 26,000 and cover price of 75p.
