= Wharfedale & Airedale Observer =

Daily newspaper reporting on parts of northern England

- Yorkshire's National Newspaper
- Type: Weekley newspaper
- Owner: Wharfedale Newspapers (Newsquest Group)
- Founded: June 4, 1880
- Headquarters: Ilkley, England
- Circulation: 10,300 (as of 2017)
- Sister newspapers: Ilkley Gazette
- ISSN: 0961-1932
- Website: www.wharfedaleobserver.co.uk

The Wharfedale Observer, in full Wharfedale & Airedale Observer, is a weekly newspaper published every Thursday of the week by Wharfedale Newspapers of Ilkley, West Yorkshire, England, and part of the Newsquest group. It was briefly known as the Gazette & Observer, in full the Ilkley, Wharfedale and Aireborough Gazette & Observer when it was a combination with the Ilkley Gazette; in that format it began publication on 10 February 2011, but three months later the paper was split off back into the separate newspapers after customer dissatisfaction.

The paper covered the towns of Wharfedale and the upper Aire Valley including Otley, Pool in Wharfedale, Leathley, Yeadon, Guiseley, Rawdon and Horsforth. The bulk of the newspaper was now produced in Ilkley and Bradford. As of 2017 circulation was approximately 10,300, with a readership of almost 26,000 and a cover price of 75p. In 2024 the price was £1.60
