= Southern Daily Echo =

Daily tabloid newspaper covering Hampshire, England

- Southern Daily Echo, 23 June 2009
- Type: Daily newspaper
- Format: Tabloid
- Owner: USA Today Co.
- Publisher: Newsquest
- Editor: Ben Fishwick
- Founded: 1888
- Political alignment: Neutral
- Language: English
- Headquarters: 4 Ocean Way, Southampton SO14 3JZ
- Circulation: 5,385 (as of 2024)
- Sister newspapers: Hampshire Chronicle, Romsey Advertiser, Bournemouth Daily Echo
- ISSN: 0969-5702
- Website: dailyecho.co.uk

The Southern Daily Echo, more commonly known as the Daily Echo or simply The Echo, is a regional tabloid newspaper based in Southampton, covering the county of Hampshire in the United Kingdom. The newspaper is owned by Newsquest, one of the largest publishers of local newspapers in the country, which is in turn owned by Gannett. It began publication in August 1888 and a website has been in existence since 1998.

Publication of the print edition is from Monday to Saturday and there is one edition a day, down from six editions a day in 2006. The Echo was initially a daily newspaper before becoming an evening paper and changing its name to the Evening Echo on 1 July 1958. It returned to being the Daily Echo again on 10 January 1994.

The Echo is currently the only paid-for local newspaper covering the city of Southampton.

On Saturdays, the Daily Echo produced the Sports Pink until 2017. This was used for the reporting of sport stories regularly involving local sports team Southampton Football Club. This was one of only two surviving 'local football papers' which used to be common throughout the UK. It ceased circulation towards the end of 2017 after 119 years.

Local sister publications include the Hampshire Chronicle, Basingstoke Gazette, Romsey Advertiser and Bournemouth Daily Echo and previously a free weekly newspaper called the Southampton Advertiser was also published. The Hampshire Independent, originally founded in 1835, was merged with the Echo in 1923.

In 2021, the newspaper moved to offices in the Ocean Village area of Southampton city centre. Previously, it had spent almost 24 years in a purpose-built print facility and office building called Newspaper House in the Redbridge area of Southampton, since 1997, with district offices in Winchester. Previously, there were also district offices in Hythe, Fareham, Lymington and Romsey. Newspaper House and the print centre were sold in 2020. The former city centre offices of the Daily Echo are now the site of the Above Bar entrance to the Westquay Shopping Centre, which opened in 2000.

The Southern Daily Echo was named Newspaper of the Year 2009 and 2011, and Campaigning Newspaper of the Year 2011 at the annual EDF Energy South East and London Media Awards.

The newspaper's website, dailyecho.co.uk, won Website of the Year at the 2012 EDF Energy South East and London Media Awards.

The current editor is Ben Fishwick, who has been in post since January 2022.

== Former editors ==
- Ben Fishwick – 2022 -
- Katie Clark – 2021 (acting)
- Gordon Sutter – 2017-2021
- Ian Murray – 1998-2017
- Duncan Jeffery – 1986-1990
- James Henry Goldsmith – 1891 - 1910
