= Waltham Forest Guardian =

Weekly local newspaper

Coordinates: 51°36′30″N 0°0′4″W

- Type: Weekly newspaper
- Owner: Newsquest
- Editor: Victoria Birch
- Founded: 1876
- Ceased publication: 2018
- Language: English
- Headquarters: Observer House, Caxton Way, Watford, WD188RJ
- Website: www.guardian-series.co.uk

Waltham Forest Guardian is a weekly local newspaper sold every Thursday in the London boroughs of Waltham Forest and Redbridge.

The paper is published by Newsquest, as part of its East London and West Essex Guardian Series (also branded as Your Local Guardian), which includes papers covering neighbouring areas, such as the Epping Forest Guardian and the Wanstead and Woodford Guardian.

The newspaper's weekly circulation is 2,508 copies, according to ABC figures for July to December 2017.

== History ==
=== Early days ===
The newspaper was founded in 1876 under the name The Walthamstow and Leyton Guardian.

In 1935 the Walthamstow Guardian opened new headquarters in Forest Road.

The newspaper group merged with the Epping Gazette series in 1942.

In 1978 the company moved to new headquarters in Forest Road, Walthamstow. Production later moved to an office in Larkshall Road, Highams Park.

=== Relocation from Waltham Forest ===
In 2009 production of the newspaper moved out of Waltham Forest for the first time in its history, with staff relocating to an office in nearby Epping in Essex. The newspaper subsequently relocated again to a Newsquest office in Watford.

In May 2015 Newsquest announced it was moving some of the newspaper's production to a 'subbing hub' in Weymouth, Dorset. The publisher said the move was an investment in the 'installation of a new editorial system to improve operational efficiency within the business and save costs'.

But just over a year later, in August 2016, the move was dubbed a 'failed experiment' by the National Union of Journalists after Newsquest announced it was cutting 19 jobs at the Weymouth site and again moving production of its newspapers back to local regions. The Weymouth office was then closed in June 2017.

Publication ceased in 2018.

== People ==
=== Notable former staff ===
- Jeff Powell, veteran sports writer at the Daily Mail
- Anton Antonowicz, who became an award winning war correspondent with the Daily Mirror
- Dorothy Byrne, Channel 4's head of news
- Andy Simpson (Daily Mail letters editor)
- Steve Gardner, who died from cancer, was an accomplished and respected TV journalist, who also started out on this local East London newspaper.

=== Editors ===
- Rex Pardoe 1970s
- John Yates 1980s
- Peter Dyke 2000s
- Pat Stannard (Wanstead and Woodford) 2000s - 2008
- Amanda Patterson (group editor) 2007 - 2012
- Anthony Longden (editorial director) 2008 - 2012
- Tim Jones (group editor) 2012 - 2017
- Victoria Birch (group editor) 2017–present
