= St Oswald's Church, Leathley =

Church in Leathley, North Yorkshire, England

Coordinates: 53°55′07″N 1°38′54″W

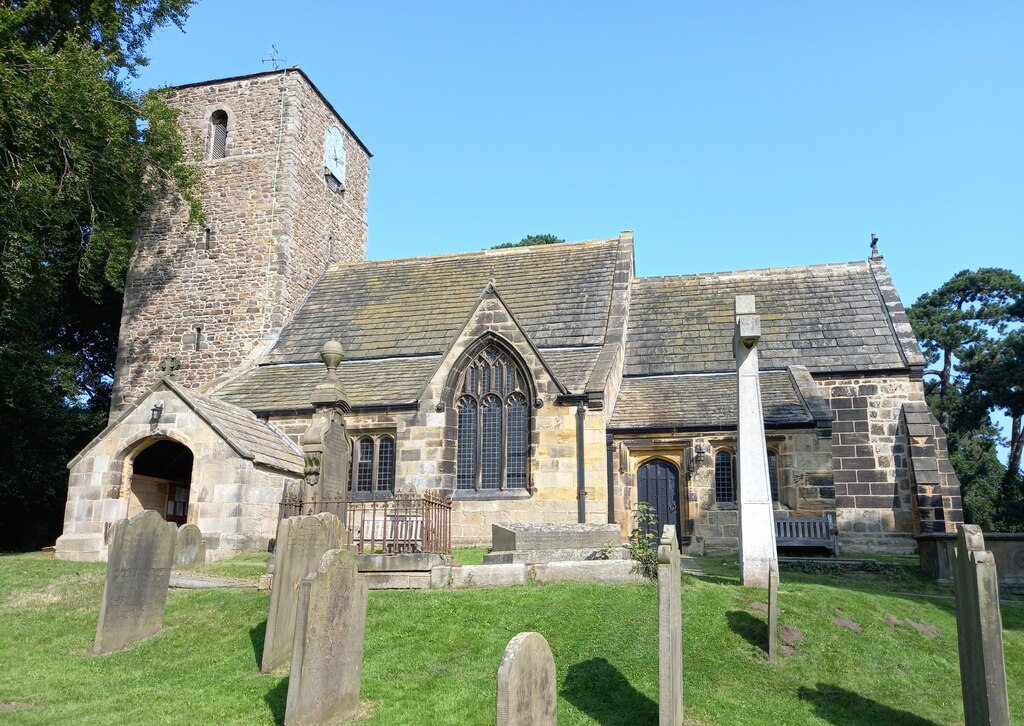
The church, in 2021

St Oswald's Church is the parish church of Leathley, a village in North Yorkshire, in England.

The church was built in the 12th century, from which period survive the tower, parts of the nave, and the chancel arch. The church was altered in about 1500. It was restored in 1869, the work including a new roof, new pews, and the addition of an organ. The building was grade I listed in 1966.

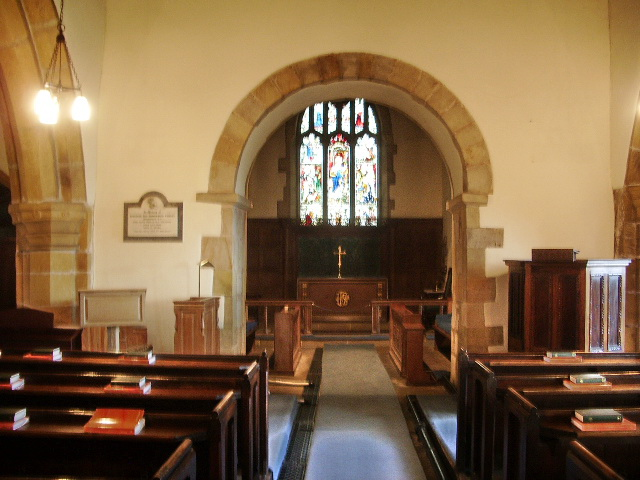
View from the nave into the chancel

The church is built of gritstone with a stone slat roof, and consists of a nave, north and south aisles, a south porch, a chancel with a north organ chamber and a south vestry, and a west tower. The tower is Norman, and has four stages. It is unbuttressed, and has quoins, slit windows in the middle stages, and above are round-arched bell openings and a pyramidal roof. The door at the west end of the nave has 12th-century iron hinges and decoration. There is also a piscina and several memorials.

== See also ==
- Grade I listed buildings in North Yorkshire (district)
- Listed buildings in Leathley
