= Leathley Almshouses =

Building in Leathley, North Yorkshire, England

Coordinates: 53°55′07″N 1°38′50″W

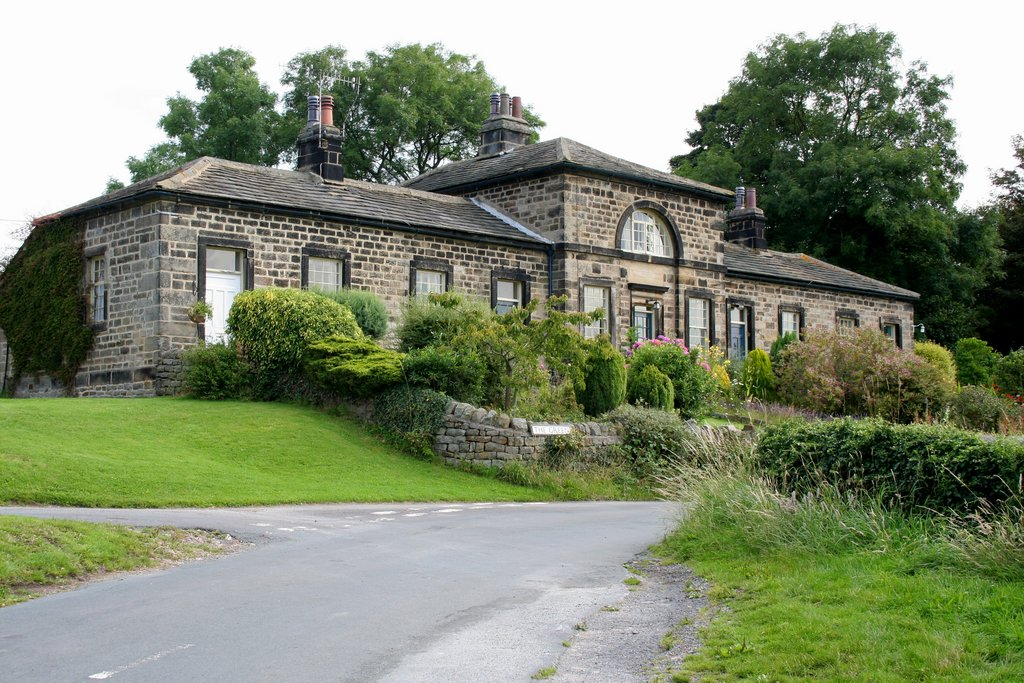
The building, in 2009

Leathley Almshouses is a historic building in Leathley, a village in North Yorkshire, in England.

The almshouses were constructed in 1769, for Ann Hitch, with four apartments flanking a school room. In the 20th century, the school closed, and the entire building has since been used as almshouses. The building was grade II listed in 1966.

The building is constructed of gritstone with a stone slate roof. In the centre is a two-storey two-bay block flanked by single-story four-bay wings. The central doorway has a moulded surround, a pulvinated frieze and a cornice, and it is flanked by sash windows in plain surrounds. Above it is a tablet with an inscription, and a large semicircular window with a plain surround and a sill band. The wings contain doorways with fanlights, and sash windows.

== See also ==
- Listed buildings in Leathley
