= Romsey Advertiser =

- Romsey Advertiser, October 1, 2010
- Type: Weekly newspaper
- Owner: Newsquest
- Editor: Kimberley Barber
- News editor: Andrew Napier
- Staff writers: Megan Stanley, Christopher Atkinson, Eve Thompson and Sophie Day
- Founded: 1896
- Circulation: 2,439 (as of 2023)
- Sister newspapers: Hampshire Chronicle, Southern Daily Echo, Andover Advertiser
- Website: romseyadvertiser.co.uk

The Romsey Advertiser is a local weekly newspaper for the town of Romsey and surrounding areas, in Hampshire, England. The paper is published every Friday. It includes local news, sport, property, classified advertising and leisure news.

It is produced from the offices of its sister title, Hampshire Chronicle, at its office in Upper Brook Street, Winchester. It used to be based at 21a Market Place in Romsey.

== History ==
It was established in 1896 as part of the Andover Advertiser. It became a separate publication in 1901.

Photographs became a regular feature in the 1960s. Colour was introduced in the early 1990s. It was a broadsheet paper until 2007, when it became compact-sized.

Until April 1991, the Romsey Advertiser was printed at the Hampshire Chronicle offices, 57 High Street Winchester. After that it was printed at Portsmouth Printing and Publishing Ltd. It was printed at Newsquest's Print Centre, in Test Lane, Redbridge, Southampton, until that closed and is now printed at Newsquest's Print Centre in Weymouth.

The Romsey Advertiser is owned by Newsquest, which is the second largest publisher of regional and local newspapers in the UK, and is itself part of the US group Gannett. Sister newspapers in the area include the Hampshire Chronicle, Andover Advertiser, Basingstoke Gazette, Southern Daily Echo and the Salisbury Journal.
