= Elmbridge Guardian =

Local newspaper published in Surrey, England

- Elmbridge Guardian front page, taken on 26 September 2013
- Type: Free weekly newspaper
- Format: Compact (Tabloid)
- Owner: Newsquest Media Group
- Ceased publication: 2014
- Headquarters: Twickenham, London
- Circulation: 21,964 (July 2012 - December 2012)
- Price: Free
- Website: elmbridgeguardian.co.uk

The Elmbridge Guardian was a weekly free local newspaper covering the borough of Elmbridge, in Surrey. It published once a week, on a Thursday, and was distributed free of charge.

It was available as a free, paperless Elmbridge Guardian e-newspaper, downloadable from Elmbridge Guardian e-newspaper and delivered straight to email inboxes each Thursday morning.

The paper was also sold for 60p at some newsagents and shops around the borough.

It had an average distribution of 21,964, including 2,700 free pick up copies at supermarkets and estate agents.

The paper was delivered to homes in Esher, Thames Ditton, Long Ditton, Hinchley Wood, Claygate, East Molesey, West Molesey, Weybridge, Walton, Hersham, Cobham and Oxshott.

The newspaper was owned by regional newspaper publisher Newsquest Media Group's South London arm along with other Guardian titles including the Kingston Guardian and the paid-for Surrey Comet.

The paper closed in 2014.
