= Wanstead and Woodford Guardian =

Local newspaper in London, England

- Type: Weekly newspaper
- Owner: Newsquest
- Founded: 1876
- Ceased publication: 2018
- Language: English
- Headquarters: Ilford, London Borough of Redbridge
- Circulation: 1,405 (as of 2017)
- Sister newspapers: Ilford Recorder, Redbridge Guardian, East London and West Essex Guardian Series

Wanstead and Woodford Guardian is a local newspaper sold every Thursday in the London Borough of Redbridge.

The paper is published by Newsquest, as part of its East London and West Essex Guardian Series (also branded as Your Local Guardian), which includes papers covering neighbouring areas, such as the Epping Forest Guardian and the Waltham Forest Guardian.

The newspaper's weekly circulation is 1,405 copies, according to ABC figures from July to December 2017.

Publication ceased in 2018.

== Editors ==
- Amanda Patterson (group editor) 2007 - 2012
- Anthony Longden (editorial director) 2008 - 2012
- Tim Jones (group editor) 2012 - 2017
- Victoria Birch (group editor) 2017–present
