= Sale & Altrincham Advertiser =

- Type: Weekly newspaper
- Format: Tabloid
- Owner: MEN Media
- Language: English
- Headquarters: Mitchell Henry House; Hollinwood Avenue; Chadderton; OLDHAM; OL9 8EF
- Website: Sale & Altrincham Advertiser

The Sale & Altrincham Advertiser was a weekly free newspaper delivered to homes in Sale, Altrincham, Timperley, Bowdon, Partington and Hale, in the Metropolitan Borough of Trafford in Greater Manchester, England. Published every Thursday, it was one of two sister MEN Media publications covering Trafford: the other is the Stretford & Urmston Advertiser, and together they replaced the Trafford Metro in October 2010.

The newspaper ceased publication in 2015.
