= Kingston Guardian =

- The Kingston Guardian front page from September 26, 2013
- Type: Weekly free newspaper
- Format: Compact (Tabloid)
- Owner: Newsquest Media Group
- Ceased publication: 30 September 2016
- Headquarters: Sutton, London; England
- Circulation: 30,546 (July 2012 - Dec 2012)
- Website: Kingston Guardian

The Kingston Guardian was a weekly free local newspaper covering the Royal Borough of Kingston upon Thames, in South West London, ceasing to be published in September 2016. It was published once a week, on a Thursday, and distributed free of charge.

It was available as a free, paperless Kingston Guardian e-newspaper and delivered straight to email inboxes each Thursday morning.

The newspaper was also sold for 60p at some newsagents and shops around the borough. It had an average distribution of 30,546, including 1,249 free pick-up copies at supermarkets and estate agents. It was delivered to homes in Kingston upon Thames, Norbiton, Surbiton, Tolworth, New Malden, Old Malden, Worcester Park, Hook and Chessington. It was owned by regional newspaper publisher Newsquest Media Group's South London arm, along with other Guardian titles including the Elmbridge Guardian and the paid-for Surrey Comet. Owing to cuts from Newsquest, the publication ceased to be printed on 30 September 2016, and became part of an amalgamated Surrey Comet.
