= Times series =

Four newspapers in north London

The Times series is a group of north London newspapers published weekly by Newsquest in the London Borough of Barnet and surroundings.

== Titles ==
Logo used for series

The series has included:

- Barnet Borough Times (previously Barnet & Potters Bar Times)
- Borehamwood & Elstree Times
- Edgware & Mill Hill Times (defunct)
- Harrow Times
- Hendon & Finchley Times (defunct)

The newspapers are mostly distributed free with a small amount sold. The total readership of the four titles as of October 2014 was 72,707.

== Sport ==
In 2013, the Times claimed to have been banned from reporting on the matches of Barnet Football Club.
