= Surrey Comet =

- Surrey Comet front page from August 2012
- Type: Weekly newspaper
- Format: Compact (Tabloid)
- Owner: Newsquest Media Group
- Editor: Andrew Parkes
- Founded: 1854
- Headquarters: Sutton, London, England
- Circulation: 15,502 (as of 2023)
- Website: www.surreycomet.co.uk

The Surrey Comet is a weekly local newspaper covering the Royal Borough of Kingston upon Thames, in South West London, and surrounding areas. It is now a free sheet but can also be purchased. It was founded in 1854 and is among the oldest London newspapers and the oldest newspaper covering Surrey. The newspaper is published once a week, every Friday, and is sold in Kingston upon Thames, Norbiton, Surbiton, Tolworth, New Malden, Old Malden, Worcester Park, Hook and Chessington.

== History ==
The Surrey Comet was founded in 1854 by Thomas Philpott, a printer from Surbiton, after he experienced a religious vision. He aimed to "expose the bad and promote the good". Subjects for the paper included The Crimean War and the cholera epidemic of 1854.

The first Surrey Comet front page from 5 August 1854

Philpott was forced to sell to Russell Knapp in 1859 due to ill health. When Knapp died suddenly in 1867 his wife Mary Ann ran the business for 33 years, before merging with rival operator and former Comet editor William Drewett, who ran the Kingston and Surbiton News, forming Knapp Drewett.

The mid-weekly Surrey Comet masthead from 1934 showing the incorporation of The Surbiton Times and Surrey County Journal. The paper at this time covered Hampton Wick, Wimbledon, Cheam, Teddington and Twickenham

The Kingston and Surbiton News continued as the mid-week Surrey Comet, published on a Wednesday until at least the late 1980s.

In 1982, the Comet was acquired by Argus Press and moved from its historic home in Church Street, Kingston, to a former furniture factory in Lower Ham Road (later renamed Skerne Road).

In 1993 it was bought by Reed Regional Newspapers, who in turn sold it to Newsquest, a management buyout group in 1996.

During its existence it has interviewed notable personalities, including a 34-year-old Alan Turing on the development of his 'electronic brain' at the nearby National Physical Laboratory in Teddington.

Alan Turing, then 34, spoke to the Surrey Comet in 1946 about his idea for 'an electronic brain' - the precursor of the modern computer

== Recent events ==
Today, the Surrey Comet is owned by Newsquest with an office in Sutton, London. It is sold for 55p at newsagents and other shops in and around the borough. In 2012, it had an average distribution of 5,777 per issue, including 2,348 copies distributed at colleges, libraries and cinemas.

The Surrey Comet has a number of sister publications, including the weekly Richmond and Twickenham Times, the Elmbridge Comet and the free Your Local Guardian series, including the Kingston Guardian.
