= Borehamwood & Elstree Times =

Hertfordshire's local newspaper

- Owner: USA Today Co.
- Publisher: Newsquest
- Language: English
- ISSN: 1753-3279
- OCLC number: 500337581
- Website: borehamwoodtimes.co.uk

The Borehamwood & Elstree Times is a local newspaper circulated in Elstree and Borehamwood, Hertfordshire, England. It is owned by the Newsquest Media Group and part of the north London Times series.
