= Chelmsford and Mid Essex Times =

UK newspaper

- Type: Weekly newspaper
- Format: Tabloid
- Owner: Newsquest Media Group
- Publisher: Newsquest (Essex) Ltd.
- News editor: Daren Francis
- Founded: 1862
- Language: English
- Website: chelmsfordweeklynews.co.uk

The Chelmsford and Mid Essex Times, formerly the 'Chelmsford Weekly News', is a weekly newspaper covering the Chelmsford and central area of Essex. The re-branded edition was launched on 22 June 2017.
