= Tivyside Advertiser =

Tivy-Side Advertiser
- Type: Weekly newspaper
- Format: Tabloid
- Owner: Newsquest
- Editor: Steve Adams
- Founded: ~1866 (as Cardigan and Tivyside Advertiser)
- Headquarters: Haverfordwest, Pembrokeshire
- Country: West Wales, United Kingdom
- Circulation: 2,037 (as of 2023)
- Website: tivysideadvertiser.co.uk

The Tivy-Side Advertiser is a Welsh newspaper that serves the Cardigan, Newcastle Emlyn, the Teifi Valley regions and parts of Pembrokeshire in West Wales. It is published by Newsquest weekly in print with an online edition. The editor in 2018 was Steve Adams, while Welsh post-punk singer Richard 'Fflach' Jones of the band Ail Symudiad used to work at the paper as a printer.

The newspaper was launched in or before 1866 as the Cardigan & Tivyside Advertiser.
