= Sutton & Croydon Guardian =

Free local newspaper published in the London Boroughs of Sutton and Croydon

- Front page of the Sutton & Croydon Guardian on 1 July 2021
- Type: Weekly free newspaper
- Format: Tabloid
- Owner(s): Newsquest Media Group
- Headquarters: Croydon, London, UK
- Circulation: 18,028 (as of 2023)
- Website: yourlocalguardian.co.uk

The Sutton & Croydon Guardian, also known as Your Local Guardian, is a weekly free local newspaper published by Newsquest that covers the South London boroughs of Sutton and Croydon, as well as surrounding areas. The newspaper is published every Wednesday and is distributed free of charge locally. It is sold for 60 pence at newsagents and other shops in and around the boroughs.

== History ==
The Croydon Guardian was launched in 1986 by regional newspaper publisher Newsquest Media Group's South London arm. The newspaper, like many other local papers, has a high average advertising content percentage of around 77% according to the Audit Bureau of Circulations. There are over 25 editions to the newspaper for different districts in the borough, although a Mitcham edition, which is in the London Borough of Merton is also published.

In 2019, the owner Newsquest merged the Sutton Guardian and Croydon Guardian to create the Sutton & Croydon Guardian.

As of May 2024, the main reporters include Amy Clarke, Ezekiel Bertrand, Berk Uyal, Poppy Huggett, and Mary O'Donovan.
