= Stretford & Urmston Advertiser =

- Type: Weekly newspaper
- Format: Tabloid
- Owner: MEN Media
- Language: English
- Headquarters: Mitchell Henry House; Hollinwood Avenue; Chadderton; OLDHAM; OL9 8EF
- Website: Stretford & Urmston Advertiser

The Stretford & Urmston Advertiser is a weekly free newspaper delivered to homes in Stretford, Urmston, Davyhulme and Flixton, in the Metropolitan Borough of Trafford in Greater Manchester, England. Published every Thursday, it is one of two sister MEN Media publications covering Trafford; the other is the Sale & Altrincham Advertiser, and together they replaced the Trafford Metro in October 2010.
