= News Shopper =

Local newspapers in south-east London

The News Shopper titles are local newspapers published in South East London and North West Kent by Newsquest.

There are five local editions: Bexley Borough, Bexley & North Kent, Bromley, Dartford & Gravesend, and Lewisham & Greenwich.

== Beginnings ==
The paper was founded in 1965 by a group of five men: advertising salesman Richard Addison, Gerald McKnight, onetime editor of the Sunday Dispatch; David English, later to become Sir David English, and South African millionaire lawyers Rayne Kruger and Anthony Aaronson.

The paper was founded with one manager, one reporter, one advertising representative, a secretary, a part-time distribution manager, photographer and fashion writer, and 140 boys to deliver the 29,000 copies. The newspaper office, in Orpington, was above a hairdressers in Chislehurst Road.

The paper was distributed for free, an unusual step at the time. Early contributors included Norris McWhirter and Ross McWhirter. The paper was bought by Rupert Murdoch in 1969.

The News Shopper titles have been merged into one website which covers south east London and north east Kent.
