= The Messenger (Trafford) =

- Type: Weekly newspaper
- Format: Tabloid
- Owner: USA Today Co.
- Publisher: Newsquest
- Language: English
- Headquarters: The Wellsprings Civic Centre, Bolton, BL1 1AR
- Website: messengernewspapers.co.uk

The Messenger is a weekly free newspaper covering the Metropolitan Borough of Trafford in Greater Manchester, England.

It was formed in 2018 from the merger of the Sale & Altrincham Messenger and the Stretford & Urmston Messenger.

The Sale & Altrincham Messenger was delivered to homes in Sale and Altrincham. The Stretford & Urmston Messenger was delivered to homes in Stretford, Urmston and Davyhulme.

It is published by Newsquest.
