= Salisbury Journal =

Local British newspaper

- Type: Weekly newspaper
- Owner: Newsquest
- Founded: 1729
- Language: English
- Headquarters: Salisbury, England
- Circulation: 6,330 (as of 2023)
- Website: www.salisburyjournal.co.uk

The Salisbury Journal is the local newspaper for the Salisbury area of England.

== History ==
Founded in 1729, it was revived by William Collins in 1736, who used it to oppose the government of Sir Robert Walpole. Benjamin Collins took over the publication of the Journal after his brother's death. In the 19th century, it was known as the Salisbury and Winchester Journal.

The Beinecke Library of Yale University owns an almost unbroken run of the Journal, from No. 1, 27 November 1736 to the end of the eighteenth century. The run of the Journal in the British Newspaper Archive begins in 1762.

The newspaper is now part of the Newsquest publishing company. It contains, among other things, local news, local sport reports, cars for sale, assorted classified advertisements and government and utility notices. It is published weekly on a Thursday.
