= Leathley =

Village and civil parish in North Yorkshire, England

Coordinates: 53°55′07″N 1°38′52″W

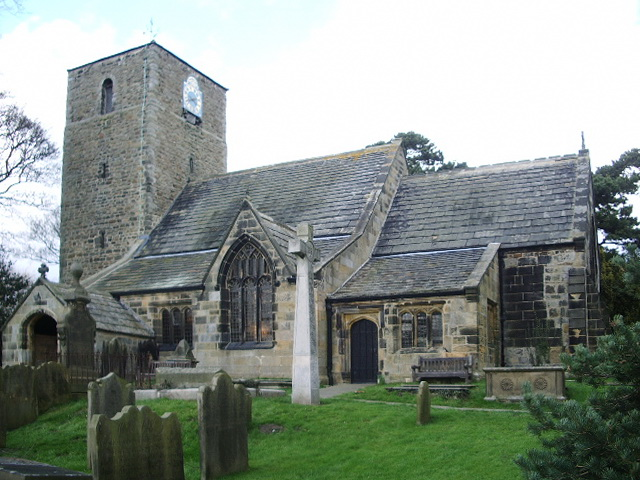
- The Parish Church of St Oswald, Leathley, built circa 1100, enlarged in the 1470s and renovated in 1869

- Location within North Yorkshire
- Population: 181 (2011 Census)
- OS grid reference: SE232471
- Civil parish: Leathley
- Unitary authority: North Yorkshire
- Ceremonial county: North Yorkshire
- Region: Yorkshire and the Humber
- Country: England
- Sovereign state: United Kingdom
- Post town: Otley
- Postcode district: LS21
- Police: North Yorkshire
- Fire: North Yorkshire
- Ambulance: Yorkshire

Leathley is a village and civil parish in the county of North Yorkshire, England, the parish includes the townships of both Castley and Leathley. It is near the border with West Yorkshire and the River Wharfe, 1 mile north-east of Otley. The B6161 runs through the village, connecting Leathley with Killinghall in the North and Pool-in-Wharfedale in the south.

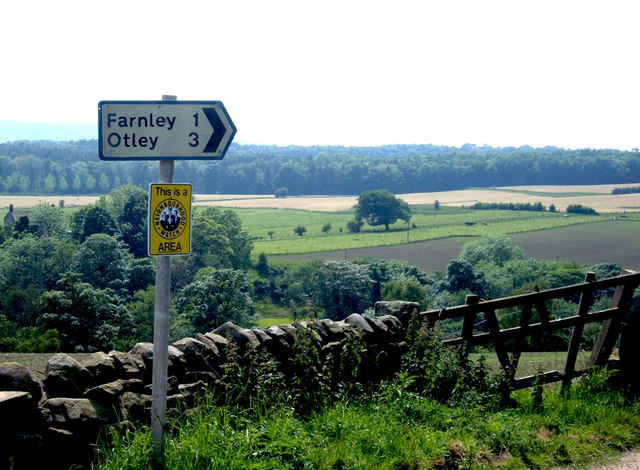
Washburn Valley

According to the 2011 census Leathley had a population of 181 people.

In 1870–72, John Marius Wilson's Imperial Gazetteer of England and Wales described Leathley as:

a village, a township, and a parish in Otley district, W. R. Yorkshire. The village stands on an affluent of the river Wharfe, 3 miles NW of Arthing. ton r. station, and 3 NE of Otley; and is. a picturesque place.

Later in the 1880s Leathley was described by John Bartholomew as:

3 miles NE. of Otley – par., 2089 ac., pop. 237; township, 1565 ac., pop. 150; contains the seat of Leathley Hall

Until 1974 it was part of the West Riding of Yorkshire. From 1974 to 2023 it was part of the Borough of Harrogate, it is now administered by the unitary North Yorkshire Council.

The name Leathley originates from the old English meaning 'slope wood/clearing' referring to the rural nature of the landscape.

== History ==
From information transcribed from the early 1820s St Oswald's Church, Leathley and the school in the parish of Leathley were described:

" The Church is a rectory in the deanry of the Ainsty. Here is a School House and four Alms Houses, founded in 1769, for the master, to teach the children of the township of Leathley, reading, writing, English grammar."

In John Marius Wilson's Imperial Gazetteer of England and Wales written between 1870 and 1872, he describes the property ownership in Leathley the Parish church and other key features of a developing community:

"The manor and much of the land belong to F. H. Fawkes, Esq. Leathley Hall is the seat of the Rev. A. Fawkes."

"The church is very ancient, of various dates; comprises nave, three aisles, and transept, with a Norman tower; and contains several mural monuments. There are a Methodist chapel, an endowed school, a national school, and an hospital."

== Population ==
The Parish register of 1821 concluded that the township of Leathley had a population of 312 persons. Between the period from the 1821 parish register to the 1921 census the total population of the civil parish of Leathley decreased gradually to 127 persons. However the total population rose between 1921 and 1951 to 241 persons, reaching a high of 245 persons in the 1931 census statistics, as a result of an increase in agricultural industry during this period. Between the period of 1961 to 2011 census data shows that the population of Leathley civil parish has declined gradually from 214 persons to 181. As shown in the Parish of Leathley total population time series graph.

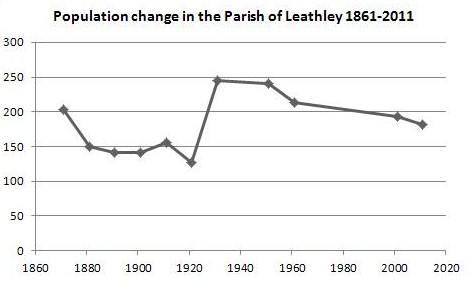
Population change in the Civil Parish of Leathley 1861–2011

== Occupation and employment ==
Before the industrial revolution Leathley Civil Parish was focused on agricultural industry with agriculture accounting for over 73 per cent of employment of males aged over 20 in 1831. In 1881, occupation figures again show that agriculture was the parish's main occupation with around 34 per cent of all industry relating to agriculture.

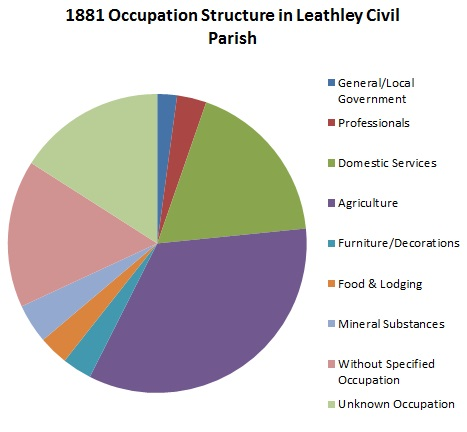
The Occupation Structure of Leathley Civil Parish in 1881

However, as the 2011 census data shows Leathley has changed its industry dependency, according to the 2011 census data under 14 per cent of workers in Leathley Civil Parish are in the agricultural sector, with industries such as finance and education becoming employers in the area.

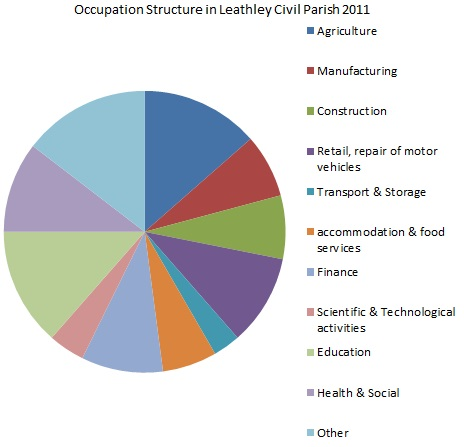
The Occupation Structure in Leathley Civil Parish in 2011

== See also ==
- Listed buildings in Leathley
