= Basingstoke Gazette =

British newspaper

- Type: Weekly newspaper
- Owner(s): Newsquest
- Circulation: 3,772 (as of 2023)
- Website: basingstokegazette.co.uk

The Basingstoke Gazette is a local newspaper for Basingstoke, Hampshire, England. The newspaper is published once a week, on a Thursday. A Wednesday edition branded as the Basingstoke Extra, distributed free of charge, ceased to be published in 2017.

The newspaper is owned by regional newspaper publisher Newsquest.
