= Epping Forest Guardian =

Local newspaper in England

- Owner: USA Today Co.
- Publisher: Newsquest
- Language: English
- Country: United Kingdom
- Sister newspapers: East London and West Essex Guardian
- Website: www.eppingforestguardian.co.uk

The Epping Forest Guardian is a local newspaper sold every Thursday in the Epping Forest District in Essex, England.

The paper is published by Newsquest. It is the sister paper to the East London and West Essex Guardian (also branded as Your Local Guardian).

The newspaper's weekly circulation is 3,495 copies, according to ABC figures from July to December 2017.

== Editors ==
- Amanda Patterson (group editor) 2008 – 200?
- Anthony Longden (group editor) 200?- 2012
- Tim Jones (group editor) 2012 – 2017
- Victoria Birch (group editor) 2017–present
