= Harrow Times =

British newspaper

- Type: Weekly newspaper
- Owner: Newsquest
- Founded: 1997
- Language: English
- Headquarters: Observer House, Watford, England
- Circulation: 15,188 (as of 2023)
- Website: harrowtimes.co.uk

Harrow Times is a British weekly local newspaper published by Newsquest, covering the London Borough of Harrow and surrounding areas.

The Harrow Times has been published since March 1997. The newspapers first front page featured a photo of Queen Elizabeth II visiting Kingsbury High School and coverage about the death of 26 year old Adam Wayne Henderson, who died whilst in police custody at Uxbridge police station.

It also has an online edition. Since the closure of Harrow Observer, the Times is the only printed paper for Harrow.
