= List of newspapers in London =

This list of newspapers in London is divided into papers sold throughout the region and local publications. It is further divided into paid for and free titles. The newspaper industry in England is dominated by national newspapers, all of which are edited in London, although The Guardian began as the Manchester Guardian. For a list of the national newspapers available in London see List of newspapers in the United Kingdom.

== Regional ==
Title	Publisher	Published	Format
City A.M.	City A.M. Ltd	Weekdays (morning)	Tabloid
MyLondon	Reach plc	Online	Tabloid
Evening Standard	Alexander Lebedev and Evgeny Lebedev (75.15%); Daily Mail and General Trust (24.9%)	Weekdays (evening)	Tabloid
Metro	Daily Mail and General Trust	Weekdays (morning)	Tabloid

== Local ==
=== Paid for ===
Title	Publisher
Barnet & Potters Bar Times	Newsquest
Croydon Advertiser	Reach plc
Docklands and East London Advertiser	Newsquest
Ealing Gazette	Reach plc
Enfield Gazette	Tindle
Fulham & Hammersmith Chronicle	Reach plc
Harrow & Wembley Observer	Reach plc
Hounslow Borough Chronicle	Reach plc
Islington Gazette	Newsquest
Newham Recorder	Newsquest
Richmond and Twickenham Times	Newsquest
Roar News	King's College London
Romford Recorder	Newsquest
Southwark News	Southwark Newspaper Ltd
Surrey Comet	Newsquest
The Art Newspaper	Umberto Allemandi
The Beaver	London School of Economics
Uxbridge Gazette	Reach plc
Waltham Forest Guardian	Newsquest

=== Free ===
Title	Publisher	Published	Format
Barking & Dagenham Yellow Advertiser	Tindle		
Bexley Mercury	Street Runners Ltd		
Bexley News Shopper	Newsquest		
Brent & Wembley Leader	Reach plc		
Bromley News Shopper	Newsquest		
Camden Gazette	Newsquest		
Camden New Journal	New Journal Enterprises		
Coombe Monthly [covers Borough of Kingston]	Independent	Monthly	
Croydon Post	Reach plc		
Ealing Leader	Reach plc		
Ealing Informer	Reach plc		
East London Advertiser	Newsquest	Weekly	
Enfield Advertiser	Tindle		
Enfield Independent	Newsquest		
Fitzrovia News	Fitzrovia Community Newspaper Group		
Haringey Advertiser	Reach plc		
Haringey Community Press	Social Spider CIC		
Harrow Leader	Reach plc		
Harrow Informer	Reach plc		
Havering Yellow Advertiser	Reach plc		
Hounslow, Chiswick & Whitton Informer	Reach plc		
Ilford & Redbridge Yellow Advertiser	Reach plc		
Islington Tribune	New Journal Enterprises		
Lewisham News Shopper	Newsquest		
London Turkish Gazette	Iliffe Print Cambridge	Thursday	
Mitcham, Morden & Wimbledon Post	Tindle		
Streatham, Clapham & West Norwood Post	Tindle		
Sutton and Croydon Guardian	Newsquest	Wednesday (morning)	Tabloid
Sutton & Epsom Post	Reach plc		
Uxbridge & Hillingdon Leader	Reach plc		
Westminster Extra	New Journal Enterprises		
Wharf Life	Massey Maddison Limited		

=== Defunct ===
Title	Period	Publisher
Barnet Press	1861–2017	
City Press	1857 – 20th century	W H & L Collingridge Ltd
Daily Post	1719–1771	Daniel Defoe
East London Observer	1857–1944	
Kingston Guardian	–2016	Newsquest
London Chronicle	1757–1823	
London Evening News	1855 - 1859	
London Evening Post	1727–1797	
London Lite	2004–2009	Associated Newspapers
The London Paper	2006–2009	News International
London Weekly	2010–2011	
Morning Star	1856–1869	
Public Advertiser	18th century	
South London Press	1865-2025	
Sport	2006-2017	Wireless Group
The Echo	1868–1905	
The Evening News	1881–1980, 1987	Harmsworth brothers
The Star	1888–1960	
The Tart	2007–2009	TartMedia Group
The True Sun	1832–1837	
The Wharf	1998-2018	Trinity Mirror
West London Observer	1855–1984	
Whitehall Evening Post	1718–1801	

=== Printed papers moved online ===
Title	Printed period	Publisher
London Student	1979 - 2015	University of London Union

== See also ==
- Media in London
- Directory of London Newspapers with Logos
