= Media in London =

London is a major international communications centre with a virtually unrivalled number of media outlets. Almost all of the major media organisations in the UK are based in London. Much of the British media is concentrated in London and is sometimes accused of having a "London bias". All the major television networks are headquartered in London including the BBC, which remains one of the world's most influential media organisations, and the largest broadcaster in the world. Partly to counter complaints about London bias, the BBC announced in June 2004 that some departments are to be relocated to Manchester. Other networks headquartered in London include ITV, Channel 4, Channel 5, CNN International and Sky UK. Like the BBC, these produce some programs elsewhere in the UK, but London is their main production centre. Local programming, including news, is provided by the regional services of the main networks: e.g. BBC London News on BBC One and ITV London on ITV.

There is a huge choice of radio stations available in London. Local citywide stations include music-based stations such as Absolute Radio, Capital London, Smooth London, Kiss, Magic Radio, Heart London, Radio X and Greatest Hits Radio London. Popular news/talk stations include BBC Radio London, LBC and LBC News.

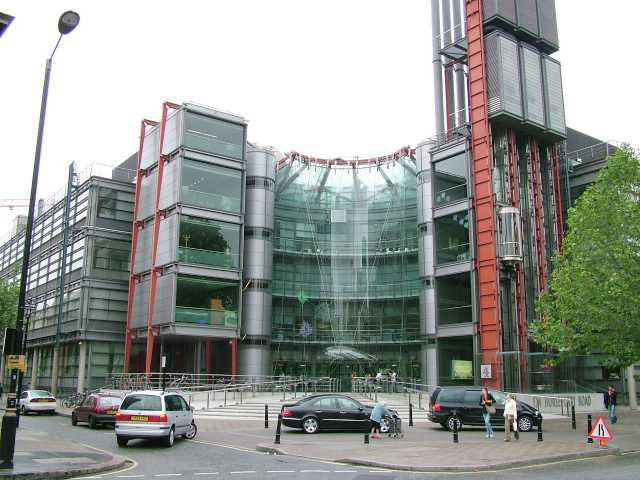
Channel 4's headquarters in Horseferry Road

The London newspaper market is dominated by London editions of the national newspapers, all of which are edited in London. Until the 1970s, most of the national newspapers were concentrated in Fleet Street, but in the 1980s they relocated to new premises with automated printing works. Most of these are in East London, most famously the News International plant at Wapping. The move was resisted strongly by the printing trade union SOGAT 82, and strike action at Wapping in 1986 led to violent skirmishes. The last major news agency in Fleet Street, Reuters, moved to Canary Wharf in 2005, but Fleet Street is still commonly used as a collective term for the national press.

London has two citywide daily newspaper titles - the Evening Standard and Metro, both of which are available on the streets and at London tube and railway stations. The Evening Standard became a free newspaper in October 2009 after 182 years as a paid-for publication. There is also a freesheet covering financial news, City A.M. The independent weekly listings guide Time Out Magazine has been providing concert, film, theatre and arts information since 1968. There are a vast number of local newspapers in the London area, often covering a small section of the city as well as two free magazines, Sport and Shortlist

London is at the centre of British film and television production industries, with major studio facilities on the western fringes of the conurbation and a large post-production industry centred in Soho (see Soho media and post-production community). London is one of the two leading centres of English-language publishing alongside New York. Globally important media companies based in London range from publishing group Pearson, to the information agency Reuters, to the world's number one advertising business group, WPP.

== See also ==
- Economy of London
- Hollywood and the United Kingdom
- List of companies based in London
- Media of the United Kingdom
