= London Weekly =

English newspaper

The London Weekly was a free newspaper that was first published in London on 5 February 2010 and ceased publication in October 2011. It had launched its website on 20 December 2009.

Plans for the London Weekly were announced shortly after the two established London free newspapers, News International's The London Paper and Associated Newspapers-owned London Lite, ceased publication and the new ownership of the London Evening Standard had announced plans to switch to free distribution. Early reports about the venture contextualised it as a serious competitor to the Standard.

Lack of clarity about the London Weekly's ownership and staffing, along with criticism of its standards of design and content, raised speculation that the publication was part of an elaborate publicity stunt or hoax. It emerged, however, that the newspaper was genuine, albeit with limited staffing.

The London Weekly was published by Global Publishing Group, a partnership between five private investors. Global Publishing Group said it had raised £10.5 million to finance the launch.

The launch edition of the London Weekly was heavily criticised by readers and media insiders. Among many gaffes, the front page included a prominent misspelling of the name of cricketer Phil Tufnell and the launch edition's lead story was nearly identical to a press release that had issued earlier in the week by rugby club London Wasps.
