= Comrade Corbyn =

2016 book by Rosa Prince

Comrade Corbyn: A Very Unlikely Coup
- Cover of the first edition
- Author: Rosa Prince
- Language: English
- Subjects: Jeremy Corbyn; 2015 Labour Party leadership election
- Published: London
- Publisher: Biteback Publishing
- Publication date: 2015
- Publication place: United Kingdom
- Media type: Print
- ISBN: 978-1-84954-996-7
- Dewey Decimal: 324.24107092

Comrade Corbyn: A Very Unlikely Coup is a 2016 book by British journalist Rosa Prince, published by Biteback Publishing. It is an unauthorised biography of Jeremy Corbyn, who was the Leader of the Opposition in the United Kingdom from 2015 to 2020.

== Background ==
Jeremy Corbyn, the left-wing Member of the House of Commons of the United Kingdom for Islington North since 1983 announced his candidacy for the 2015 Labour Party leadership election. He struggled to obtain the required nominations from fellow MPs and was initially seen as a fringe candidate and an outsider. However, he was subsequently elected as leader in a landslide, with nearly 60% of the vote.

The book was published by Biteback Publishing, a publisher jointly owned by Conservative Party activist and blogger Iain Dale and Conservative Party Member of the House of Lords Michael Ashcroft. It was authored by Rosa Prince, a journalist with the Conservative and right-wing newspaper The Daily Telegraph.

== Synopsis ==
Comrade Corbyn is a biography of the political career of Corbyn, including his unexpected and successful run for the Labour leadership. The book also examines his early life in rural Shropshire, his support for contentious causes such as Palestinian freedom and a peace process in Northern Ireland.

== Reception ==
Critical reception was mixed. In The Guardian, Zoe Williams broadly criticised Comrade Corbyn. She suggested that much of the "revelations" were sourced from the Daily Mail. Williams was critical of the gossip and lack of serious political analysis, noting that instead a former "remote associate" was quoted claiming Corbyn's flat was "an absolute tip". Williams did praise the more objective analysis of Corbyn's support for causes in Northern Ireland and Palestine. Williams described some elements of the book as "meticulously uninterested, slightly spiteful analysis". In The Independent, Andy McSmith defended the book. He wrote that "with all due respect to Corbyn-loving acolytes – this is not a hatchet job. It is an affectionate portrait of a man she (the author) obviously thinks has landed himself in the wrong job". Pointing to criticism of Prince's book from Corbyn's followers, McSmith said that "when the Corbyn era is over ... I doubt if its author will be accused of being 'spiteful'. I think the verdict will be that she was rather kind".

Jeremy Corbyn told his local newspaper, the Islington Tribune, that "I've seen the book. It's riddled with inaccuracies. I found 14 in the first eight pages I read. Dates, places, names, people, all things that could have been checked if the research had been done properly". He noted that "I think it generally lacks an analysis of the politics of Britain at the time. It's a disappointing book. She had no approval from me, for the writing of it or approaching people to undertake interviews". Corbyn also suggested Prince had been impolite in the way she dealt with Corbyn and his family, stating "I'm pleased she notes my politeness. I wish she had shown the same politeness to me. She might care to adopt that characteristic herself".
