= Ted Young (journalist) =

British journalist and editor

Ted Young (born 1961) is a British journalist and former editor of Metro. He is currently an editorial director at Cover Media and is also on the complaints committee of the Independent Press Standards Organisation (IPSO).

Young stepped down as editor of Metro in March 2023, after being appointed to the role in 2014. Earlier in his career he was night editor for The Sun, editor of London Lite, editor of MailOnline and online editor of the New York Daily News.

== Early life ==
Young was born in Dar es Salaam, Tanzania. The son of a diplomat, he grew up in Nigeria, India, Iceland and Seychelles. He was educated at Eastbourne College in East Sussex and Fitzwilliam College, Cambridge.

== Newspaper career ==
Young has worked for the Harrow Observer (1983), The Northern Echo (1985), Today (1988), Daily Mail (1995), The Sun (1999), Daily Express (2002), London Lite (2005–2009), MailOnline (2009–2012), the New York Daily News Online (2012–2014) and Metro (2014–present).

=== Richard Desmond incident (Daily Express) ===
In 2004 Young left the Daily Express after allegedly being punched by its then-owner Richard Desmond. Desmond, who denied attacking Young, was reportedly unhappy that a story about the death of 1960s pop star Carl Wayne had not been included in the newspaper. Young took the Daily Express to an employment tribunal in 2005 but a settlement was reached the day before the hearing was due to begin. The terms of the settlement were not made public but press reports claimed Young was paid "a six-figure sum".

=== New York Daily News Online ===
Young was hired as editor of the New York Daily News Online by the newspaper's then editor-in-chief and fellow Briton Colin Myler in May 2012.

During Young's time as web editor, it became the second most-visited newspaper website in the US, surpassed only by The New York Times. Young received press attention during 2012's Hurricane Sandy for managing to edit the New York Daily News overnight despite a power cut and flooding to its offices in New York City.

=== Metro ===
Young was appointed editor of Metro in April 2014, replacing Kenny Campbell. A month before he joined the newspaper, parent company DMGT separated production of Metro newspaper and www.metro.co.uk, moving management of the website to MailOnline. This meant Young's editorship would be focused entirely on the print and tablet editions. A different editorial team was established to run the website.

Following a series of changes under Young, including a redesign and an expansion of its publication regions, Metro became the highest circulation newspaper in the UK in March 2018.

Young was asked to appear before the UK Parliament's Home Affairs Select Committee in April 2018, alongside other national newspaper editors, as part of its inquiry into the relationship between the media and hate crime in British society. He told MPs that Metro newspaper had tried to reduce racial tensions following terror attacks. Young told the committee: 'Mistakes happen but we definitely as a paper try to be proactive in promoting racial harmony and a sense of national togetherness, especially in times of crisis.'

He left the role in March 2023 amid redundancies and cutbacks at the newspaper.
