= The Tart =

London-based satirical newspaper

- Type: Satirical newspaper / webzine
- Format: Tabloid
- Owner: TartMedia Group
- Editor: Ben Cooper
- Founded: 2007
- Headquarters: London
- Website: Inactive

The Tart was a free London-based satirical newspaper, and later an online webzine.

== History ==
The precursor of The Tart was a Bristol University newspaper edited by Tobes Kelly in the first six months of 2007. The Tart was set up as a response to a perceived lack of variety in the student newspaper market, and Kelly's desire to revive student satire through enabling and encouraging students to collaborate regardless of university campus borders. The Tart's tone was satirical, and has been described as "tolerant, witty and parodying the folly of those in the public eye". The newspaper was part of the TartMedia Group, which is owned by Kelly.

A website was established in August 2007, and The Tart was distributed across ten university campuses during termtime in late 2007, including Oxford University, Cambridge University, Bristol University, Warwick University and London School of Economics.

After receiving a positive response from trial distributions to London commuters, the decision was taken to move out of the student market. After securing significant funding, The Tart launched for London commuters in January 2008, and enjoyed a brief run in the capital, at a time when other now-defunct London freesheets such as London Lite and thelondonpaper were also distributed as part of a brief "old-fashioned newspaper war".

The paper's income was affected by the economic downturn, and midway through 2008, The Tart decided to focus on an online webzine. In summer 2008, it relaunched with a new website and editorial team.

The website closed in June 2009.
