= City Press =

City Press may refer to:

- City Press (London), a defunct newspaper in London, England, publishing in the 19th and early-20th centuries
- City Press (South Africa), a newspaper in South Africa
- City News Bureau of Chicago, a news agency
