= Hazell, Watson and Viney =

English printer and publisher

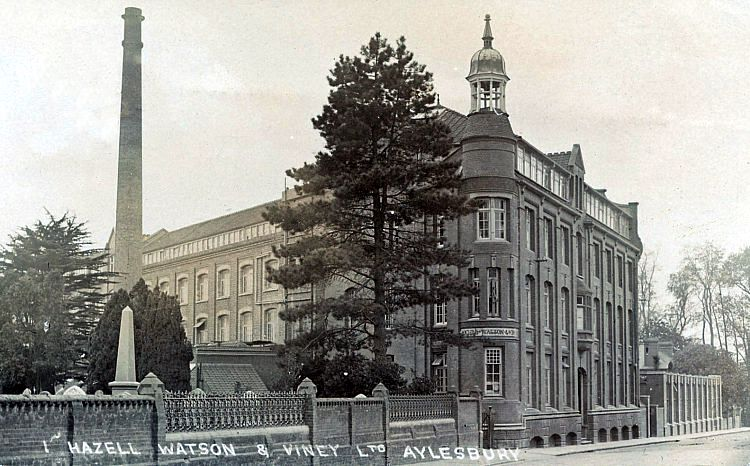
The printing works of Hazell, Watson and Viney, built in 1878 on Tring Road

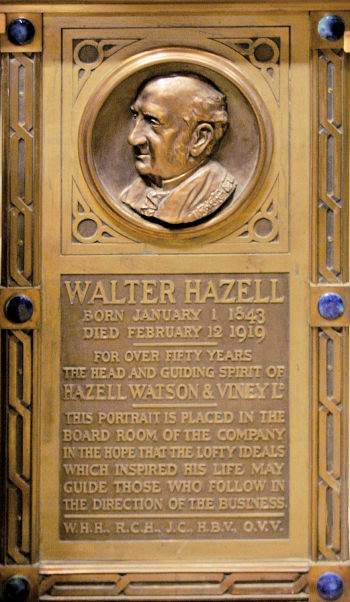

Hazell, Watson and Viney was an English printing and publishing firm with works in Aylesbury that operated from 1839 to c. 1991.

== History ==
The company started as a printing business established by a certain William Paul in Kirby Street, Hatton Garden in 1839. In 1843 it was sold to George Watson, then working as a jobbing printer and stationer at Tring in Herts. He bought a new Hopkinson & Cope press, modernised the plant by introducing steam power and considerably expanding the enterprise, initially printing the temperance magazine "Band of Hope Review". His printing contracts soon included the monthly "The British Workman and Friends of the Sons of Toil". To these were added "Eclectic and Congregational Review", "Alexandra Magazine", "Woman's Social and Industrial Advocate" and "Family Mirror". Walter Hazell (1843-1919) joined the firm in 1863 and it became known as Watson and Hazell. Hazell launched the "Illustrated Photographer" and "Amateur Photographer", and also printed the "Marylebone Mercury", the "East London Observer" and the "Bucks Independent".

In 1867 the firm opened a branch in Aylesbury and in 1873 another branch in the Strand, London. When John Elliott Viney joined the firm as a partner in 1875, it became Hazell, Watson and Viney. A merger with Ford and Tilt of Long Acre Street, London in 1884, saw the firm changed its name again, this time to Hazell, Watson and Viney, Ltd, valued at £138,000. The 1890s saw the printing of some sixty newspapers and periodicals at Kirby Street. The legal and commercial printing division was located in Long Acre Street while books were mainly produced at Aylesbury. In 1869 the head office was moved from Kirby Street to Charles Street, in 1889 to Creed Street, Ludgate Hill, and finally in 1901 to Long Acre Street. The Kirby Street works were closed in 1920 and moved to Aylesbury and Long Acre Street. In 1878 the Aylesbury branch was moved to Tring Road in Aylesbury, undergoing periodic expansion from 1885 onwards. By 1939 the firm's employees numbered 1700.

Walter Hazell, born on 1 January 1843, was the only surviving son of Jonathan Hazell. As chairman he played an active part in the company's affairs for some fifty years, and was a social reformer and Women's Suffrage supporter who wrote several pamphlets on social issues. He was also the Liberal Member of Parliament for Leicester between 1894 and 1900, and was instrumental in introducing an employees' sick fund in 1874, one of many such welfare schemes that marked the firm as progressive. The Buckinghamshire County Museum has a portrait of his son. "Hazell's Magazine", which appeared from 1886, was one of the company's first in-house publications. Several generations of the Viney family played a major part in the running of the company. Hazell's grew after World War II as part of the Hazell Sun group of companies, and in 1963 became the British Printing Corporation, one of the most influential printing and publishing organisations in Britain. The company no longer operates in Aylesbury and has been dissolved.
