= Southwark News =

Weekly newspaper in Southwark, London

- Type: Local weekly newspaper
- Format: Tabloid
- Owner: Southwark Newspaper Limited
- Editor: Kevin Quinn
- Managing editor: Chris Mullany; Kevin Quinn
- Language: English
- Headquarters: The Biscuit Factory; 100 Drummond Road; London SE16 4DG; United Kingdom
- Website: www.southwarknews.co.uk

Southwark News is a weekly local newspaper based in Southwark, south London, England. It is the only independent, paid-for newspaper in London. The newspaper is owned and run by Southwark Newspaper Limited, based in Bermondsey.

Southwark News was founded by Dave Clark as the Bermondsey News in 1987, later expanding to the borough and the surrounding area. It was funded for a time by Barry Albin-Dyer. In 2002, Albin-Dyer offered to sell the company to Chris Mullany and Kevin Quinn, and they bought the business.

== See also ==
- List of newspapers in London
