= Alexandra Brown =

British author and columnist

Alexandra (Alex) Brown
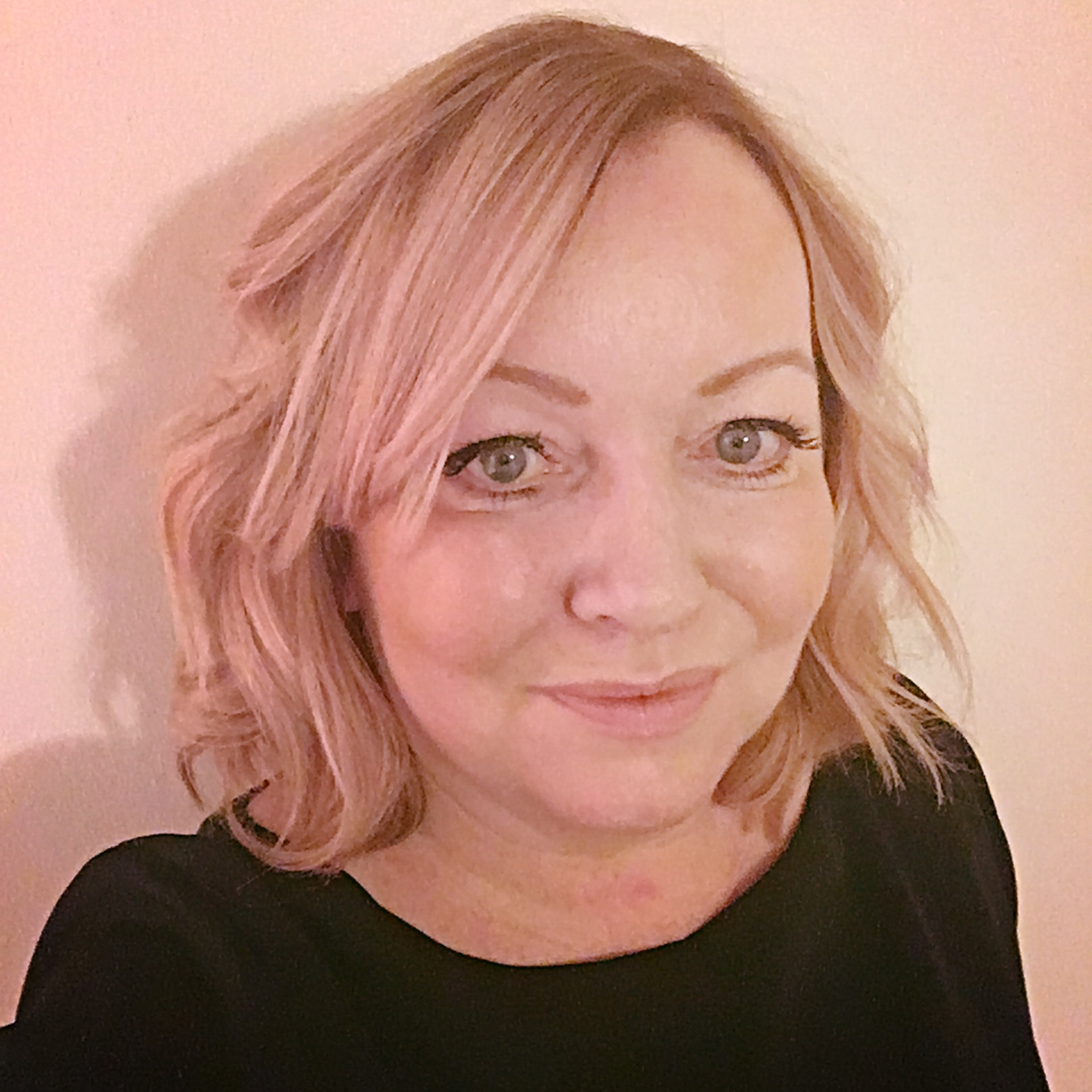
- Born: Brighton, East Sussex, England
- Occupation: Author
- Children: One, daughter
- Writing career
- Language: English
- Genre: Women's literature
- Notable works: "Carrington's" series, "Tindledale" series
- Website: www.alexbrownauthor.com

Alex Brown is a British author and columnist. She has written eleven novels, including the Carrington's series, The Great Christmas Knit Off, The Great Village Show, The Secret of Orchard Cottage, and A Postcard from Italy. Her books are published internationally and have been translated into seven languages.

Formerly the City Girl columnist for The London Paper, she signed a three-book deal with HarperCollins publishers to write the Carrington's series of novels. In 2014 she signed a second three-book deal with HarperCollins to write the Tindledale series.

== Biography ==
Alexandra was born in Brighton and worked in financial services for many years. After leaving the corporate world she won a competition to write the weekly City Girl column for The London Paper.

Alexandra was well known for writing the City Girl column for the London Paper. This role began in 2006 following a competition win. She has also written short stories and articles for a wide range of magazines, including Prima and Cosmopolitan.

She got her first book deal after meeting a HarperCollins editor at a Romantic Novelists' Association party, and they worked together on what was to become the Carrington series. In 2014, HarperCollins signed her to write a further series of three books set in the fictional village of Tindledale.

== Personal life ==
Brown lives by the sea in Kent with her husband, daughter and two very glossy black Labradors.

Brown says she is superstitious and needs to light a candle before she sits down to write.

Brown hobbies involves knitting and attending Northern Soul nights. She also supports charities, working with care leavers and members of society.

== Bibliography ==
- Cupcakes at Carrington's. London: Harper. 2013. ISBN 9780007488230.
- Me and Mr Carrington. London: Harper. 2013. ASIN B00ES2NPBC.
- Christmas at Carrington's. London: Harper. 2013. ISBN 9780007488254.
- Ice Creams at Carrington's. London: Harper. 2014. ISBN 9780007488278.
- The Great Christmas Knit Off. London: Harper. 2014. ISBN 9780007597369.
- The Great Village Show. London: Harper. 2015. ISBN 9780007597390.
- The Secret of Orchard Cottage. London: Harper. 2016. ISBN 978-0007597420.
- Not Just for Christmas. London: Harper. 2016. ASIN B00QSRZOV4.
- The Wish. London: Harper. 2018. ISBN 978-0008206697.
- A Postcard from Italy. London: Harper. 2019. ISBN 978-0008206666.
- A Postcard from Paris. London: Harper. 2021. ISBN 978-0008421984.
- A Postcard from Capri. London: Harper. 2022. ISBN 978-0008422011.
