= Camden New Journal =

British newspaper in London

- The front page of the Camden New Journal on 17 January 2019
- Type: Newspaper
- Owner: New Journal Enterprises
- Founder: Eric Gordon
- Launched: 1982; 44 years ago
- Language: English
- Headquarters: 40 Camden Road; Camden Town; London, NW1 9DR
- City: London
- Country: England
- Circulation: ~70,000 including sister titles (as of 2020)
- Sister newspapers: Westminster Extra, Islington Tribune
- OCLC number: 751714604
- Website: www.camdennewjournal.com
- Free online archives: Camden New Journal e-edition

The Camden New Journal is a British independent newspaper published in the London Borough of Camden. It was launched by editor Eric Gordon in 1982 following a two-year strike at its predecessor, the Camden Journal. The newspaper was supported by campaigning journalist Paul Foot and former Holborn and St Pancras MP Frank Dobson. It carries significant influence locally, due to its high news content, investigations and large circulation.

It is frequently critical of local and national government, which has led to attacks by national government ministers, as well as local councillors, unusually for a local paper. On being awarded its second Press Gazette Free Newspaper of the Year award in 2005, the judges praised how the paper kept its "huge local council on its toes with exclusive after exclusive".

== History ==
The Camden New Journal has its origins in 1872, when the Holloway Press began. In 1875, the newspaper was renamed the North Metropolitan and Holloway Press before becoming the Holloway Press in 1880, the Islington & Holloway Press in 1923, and the North London Press from 1942.

From 1964, separate editions of the North London Press were published for Islington and Camden, before the publications separated in February 1971 to form the Holloway & Islington Journal and the Camden Journal, the former being discontinued in 1974.

The Camden Journal continued until the 1980s when Eric Gordon bought the newspaper from Courier Press for £1 following a 16-month strike that started when nine journalists were dismissed in December 1980 upon the closure of the original Camden Journal. Camden Labour backed the journalists and on 3 January 1981 they helped distribute the first edition of Save the Journal. A campaign was launched that was backed by journalists at the Hornsey Journal and Islington Gazette and NUJ members in Nuneaton, Leamington Spa, Rugby, Haverfordwest, Ammanford and London's suburban papers. The campaign succeeded, with the publication being turned into a free newspaper and re-launched as the Camden New Journal on 25 March 1982.

The paper launched with eight full time admin and editorial staff, and others contributing their services, including sub-editor and designer Renee Oldfield, formerly of the Enfield Gazette, and her husband Irving, retired chief press officer at the National Coal Board, competing against its long established competitors, the St Pancras Chronicle and the Hampstead and Highgate Express. Gordon gradually built on the tiny circulation of the former Camden Journal by combining the usual local paper fare of fetes, deaths and marriages with hard-edged campaigning news stories highlighting social inequity, particularly on issues of class and race. The newspaper occupied a one-room office on the ground floor of 40 Camden Road, Camden Town; these offices had been the base, courtesy of the Town Hall, of the weekly strike paper, Save The Journal.

In 2006, the Camden New Journal – and its sister paper the Islington Tribune – broke the national story that government minister Margaret Hodge had described the war in Iraq as British Prime Minister Tony Blair's biggest mistake.

In 2020, during the COVID-19 pandemic, the Camden New Journal set up a food aid van project in which the paper played a role in getting food to those at risk of going hungry.

As of 2021, the Camden New Journal has a distribution of 50,000, which includes door-to-door deliveries and pick-up bins around the borough of Camden. The newspaper reaches one in every two people in the borough and there is also an e-reader edition.

In March 2023, to mark International Women's Day, Issue 2120 was written exclusively by women. The 'Not Just One Day' edition, edited by Anna Lamche, had articles written by regular journalists Frankie Lister-Fell, Izzy Rowley and Charlotte Chambers, in addition to contributions from notable women such as Hampstead and Kilburn MP Tulip Siddiq, Liberal Democrat politician Luisa Porritt, author Kathy Lette, Camden Council leader Georgia Gould, journalist Joan Bakewell, author Bonnie Greer, writer Joanna Briscoe and Green Party Co-leader Sian Berry AM. The sports pages, written by Catherine Etoe, covered news from sporting events featuring women.

== Content ==
Now part of the New Journal Enterprises group, the newspaper's content is produced at 40 Camden Road in Camden Town, London and covers the areas of Belsize Park, Bloomsbury, Camden Town, Chalk Farm, Covent Garden, Gospel Oak, Hampstead, Holborn, Kentish Town, Kilburn, Primrose Hill, Regent's Park, Somers Town, Swiss Cottage and West Hampstead.

In addition to local news stories, the paper covers arts and features, local politics in the Peeps column and sport. The paper also includes a letters page and a diary page, penned by John Gulliver. Richard Osley has been editor of the publication since 2021.

Current journalists at the Camden New Journal include Dan Carrier, Anna Lamche, Frankie Lister-Fell, Izzy Rowley, Charlotte Chambers, Steve Barnett and Tom Foot. Former contributor Rose Hacker was believed to be the world's oldest columnist; her column ceased with her death in 2008 at the age of 101.

== Awards ==
In 2008, journalist Paul Keilthy was nominated in both the Reporter Of The Year and Feature Writer Of The Year categories at the Press Gazette awards. Richard Osley was also shortlisted for Feature Writer Of The Year. Journalists Dan Carrier and Simon Wroe were nominated in 2009 for the same award. William McLennan was named weekly reporter of the year at the Regional Press Awards 2018. The newspaper was nominated for Newspaper Of The Year for regional newspapers with high circulations.

It was named Free Newspaper of The Year at Press Gazette's national industry awards in 2001, 2003, 2005, 2010, 2018, 2019 and 2021. It was nominated in 2002, 2004 and 2020. In 2020, the award went to sister title the Islington Tribune.

== Editors ==
1982 – 2021: Eric Gordon

2021 – present: Richard Osley

== Eric Gordon ==
The Camden New Journal was launched by Eric Ephraim Gordon in March 1982. Gordon was born on 28 May 1931 and grew up in Wythenshawe, Greater Manchester, where his parents, Samuel and Sarah Gordon, ran a newspaper shop. He had a brother, Jeffrey, and sister, Anita. Gordon's grandparents, Philip (a tailor) and Leah Gordon, emigrated to the United Kingdom in the 1880s from Eastern Europe. Gordon, who was Jewish, subsequently moved to Cheetham, north Manchester where he attended a secular school before being offered a place at Gateshead Yeshivah. He then moved to a Talmudic college in Stamford Hill, London; however, he ran away after two years. On Gordon's eighteenth birthday, he joined the Young Communist League, after being persuaded by his communist brother to reject institutionalised Judaism.

Gordon learnt shorthand and typing in his ambition to become a journalist. After spending three years of National Service in the pathology labs of the Royal Medical Corps, he worked on a series of local newspapers, including the Brighton Evening Argus and the Daily Herald. Gordon married Marie (née Biney) in 1955 and the couple had a son, Kim, in 1965, and daughter, Leigh, in 1970.

In February 1965, Gordon took his wife and son to Beijing to work in the Chinese government's foreign-language publishing house. By 1967, Gordon had been accused of spying in and spent two years under house arrest. The Chinese authorities found notes about the Cultural Revolution, on which he planned to write a book, while Gordon was working in a commune. In 1969, following surgery for cancer, he negotiated a cleverly worded 'confession', admitting to being anti-Marxist and bourgeois, but not a spy. After Gordon's release, he wrote a book, Freedom Is a Word.

Gordon's second marriage was to Samantha (née Harding), with whom he had a second daughter, Elly. Gordon lived in Primrose Hill and died on 5 April 2021, aged 89, after a short illness. He was the Camden New Journal's founding and only editor, celebrating the 2000th issue in 2020, and continued to work on the publication until his death. The Camden New Journal's deputy editor, Richard Osley, wrote, "As editor of one of the last independent titles in the UK, he was proud of the newspaper's freedom from large groups and championed a co-op style structure, warning that papers would struggle to survive if they had to answer to faraway group executives or distant shareholders seeking dividends each year."

=== Legacy ===
Before Gordon's death, he set out a vision to set up a new management structure for the newspaper. He proposed the idea of an outside body of trustees to represent the community and to ensure the newspaper followed, as faithfully as possible, the aims and principles that led to its birth in 1982. Following Gordon's death, the intention is to ensure the newspaper can not be bought by one person who could change its focus towards making a profit; true to Gordon's original aim of only covering the costs to allow for the publication of a "campaigning, open-to-all newspaper".

== Westminster Extra ==
The Westminster Extra, also known as the Extra, began as a pull-out in its sister paper the Camden New Journal as the West End Extra. The Extra was formed by former Camden New Journal editor, Eric Gordon, after seeing a gap in the market for a 'local, free to read and stubbornly independent' newspaper in the West End, and in 1994 the first stand-alone edition was launched. The newspaper was free from dispensers across Covent Garden, Soho, Marylebone and Mayfair, as well as being sold at selected newsagents for 17p. The paper has covered major national events, such as the Admiral Duncan pub bombings in 1999 and the 2005 7/7 bombings, as well as local issues, including the aftermath of the Shirley Porter Homes For Votes scandal.

The Extra covers the entire City of Westminster and is produced from the New Journal's Camden Town office. Despite the paper's name, it also includes Kensington and Chelsea in its list of areas covered. The paper includes a letters page and a diary column, Harrington, named after former literary editor Illtyd Harrington, Ken Livingstone's former deputy on the Greater London Council.

In February 2023, the Extra published its 1,500th edition.

== New Journal Enterprises group ==
The Camden New Journal, Islington Tribune, Westminster Extra, and The Review are all publications of New Journal Enterprises.

The Islington Tribune, launched in 2003, is a widely-read local newspaper in the London Borough of Islington, contributed to by Koos Couvée and Joe Cooper. Former reporters include Joel Taylor, Kim Janssen and Andrew Walker, who works for the BBC, as well as former Camden New Journal deputy editor Andrew Johnson. Peter Gruner, an award-winning environment journalist who previously worked for the Evening Standard, worked for the title until 2015.

The Westminster Extra (formerly known as the West End Extra, a name it retains online), which covers the entire City of Westminster, launched in 2005 and is also produced from the New Journal's Camden Town office. Both are also edited by Tom Foot. Despite the paper's name, it also includes Kensington and Chelsea in its list of areas covered.

== Other newspapers in the neighbouring area ==
- Barnet Times
- Brent & Kilburn Times
- Hampstead & Highgate Express
- Islington Gazette
- Westminster Extra

== See also ==
- Camden New Journal official website
