= Paul Dobraszczyk =

British writer and academic

Paul Dobraszczyk is a British writer and academic whose work addresses architecture, as well as a photographer and visual artist.

== Career ==
Dobraszczyk was educated at Wellingborough School from 1987 to 1992, and then read for a Bachelor of Arts in History of Art and Architecture at the University of Reading from 1995-8. He returned to Reading from 2000-1 to read for a Master of Arts in Visual and Verbal Representation in British Culture 1840-1940. He worked as an editor at ArtBibliographies Modern (ProQuest) after completing the MA. He returned to Reading for a third time to read for a PhD in History of Art and Architecture from 2003-6. His thesis was entitled Into the Belly of the Beast: Spatial Representation and London's Main Drainage System, c. 1848-68. From 2006-10, he was a postdoctoral research fellow in Reading's Department of Typography and Graphic Communication on the Arts and Humanities Research Council project Designing Information for Everyday Life, 1815-1914. He published his first book, Into the Belly of the Beast: Exploring London's Victorian Sewers, with Spire in 2009.

Dobraszczyk taught briefly at Birkbeck before taking up a Leverhulme Early Career Fellowship at the University of Manchester in Art History and Visual Studies from 2011-12. His project was called Function & Fantasy: Victorian Decorative Cast Iron. He held the role of Lecturer in Art History at Manchester from 2013-16. In 2014, he published London's Sewers with Shire Books and Iron, Ornament and Architecture in Victorian Britain: Myth and Modernity, Excess and Enchantment with Ashgate. He took up the role of Lecturer in History & Theory of Architecture at the Bartlett School of Architecture in 2015. In his time at Bartlett, he has published three edited collections (Function & Fantasy: Iron Architecture in the Long Nineteenth Century, Global Undergrounds: Exploring Cities Within, and Manchester: Something Rich and Strange) and four sole-authored monographs: The Dead City: Urban Ruins and the Spectacle of Decay, Future Cities: Architecture and the Imagination, Architecture and Anarchism: Building Without Authority, and Animal Architecture: Beasts, Buildings and Us.
