= Islington Gazette =

Local newspaper published in Islington, London

- Type: Weekly newspaper
- Owner: USA Today Co.
- Publisher: Newsquest
- Founded: 1856
- Circulation: 4,887 (as of 2023)
- Website: islingtongazette.co.uk

The Islington Gazette is a weekly paid-for newspaper covering the London Borough of Islington in north London, England. It was established as the Daily Gazette in 1856, publishing twice weekly from 1926. It was owned by Independent News & Media until 2003, when it was bought by Archant.

The Stoke Newington and Hackney Observer was founded as the North London Observer in 1939 and merged with the Islington Gazette in 1971, which subsequently published as the Islington Gazette and Stoke Newington Observer.

The Gazette celebrated its 150th birthday on 21 September 2006. It is published on Thursdays from offices on Tottenham Lane, Hornsey and covers local news and sport in Islington, Archway, Finsbury Park, Holloway and surrounding boroughs such as Hackney and Haringey.

== See also ==
- Islington Tribune
- List of newspapers in London
