= East London Observer =

Defunct British newspaper

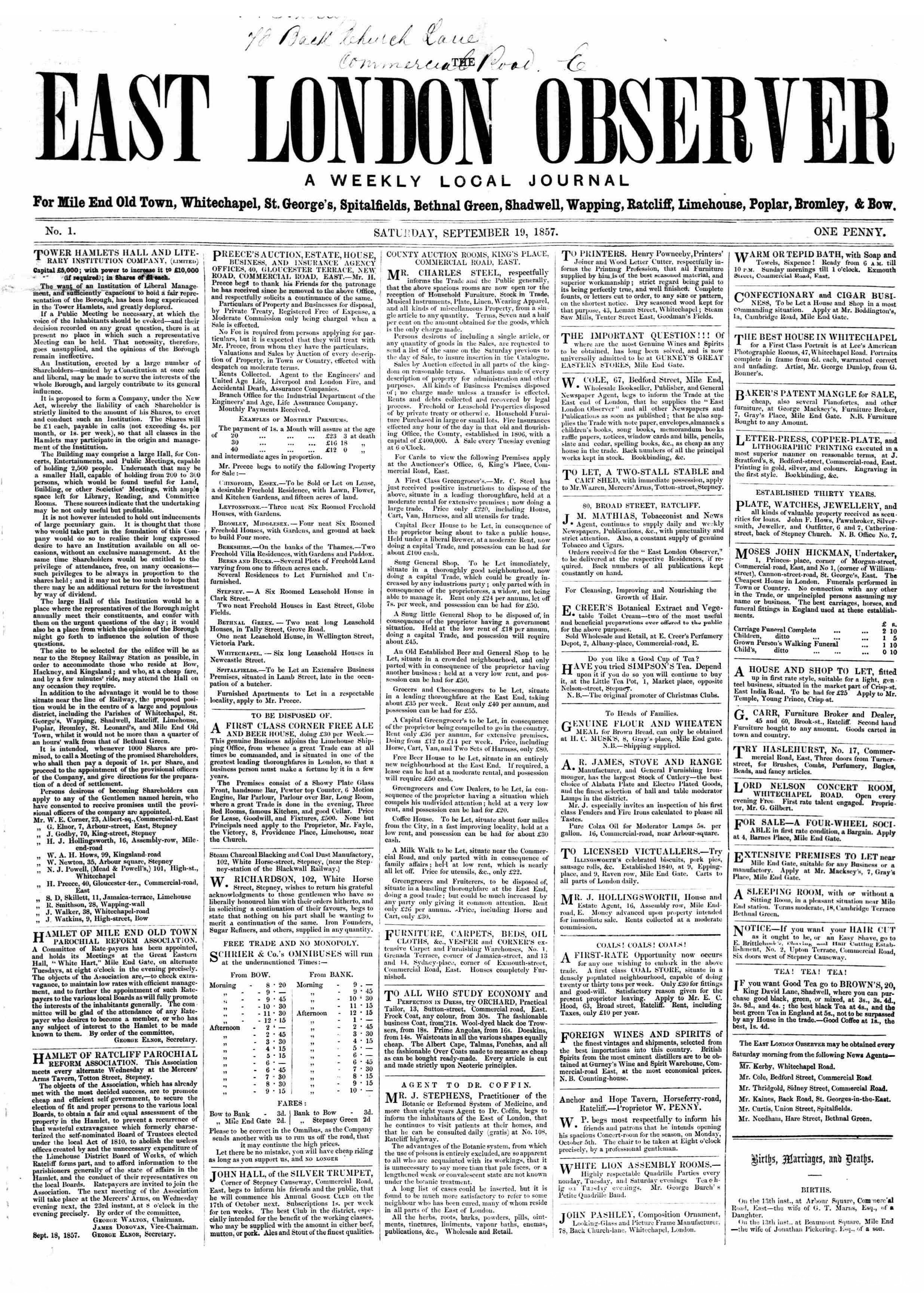
The first edition of The East London Observer, 19 September 1857.

The East London Observer was a newspaper in East London first published in 1857. From 3 November 1928 it became the City and East London Observer. World's business news and views. It was last published on 17 November 1944.

From 1888, the paper was one of those that covered the killings of Jack the Ripper in detail.

At one time it was printed by Hazell, Watson and Viney.
