= Sport (British magazine) =

- Cover of Sport, Issue No. 230
- Editor: Tony Hodson
- Categories: Sports magazine
- Frequency: Weekly (Fridays)
- Publisher: Wireless Group
- Total circulation: 305,684 (June 2013)
- First issue: 29 September 2006
- Final issue: 3 February 2017
- Country: United Kingdom
- Based in: London
- Language: English
- Website: www.sport-magazine.co.uk

Sport was a free weekly sports magazine based in London which covered a wide range of events such as football, rugby, tennis and cricket as well as giving exclusive interviews with various sports personalities.

== Overview ==
It started in France in 2003 as a free monthly and in March 2004 as a weekly. The London edition started on 29 September 2006, the first of its type in the UK and was sold to Talksport owners UTV Media (now Wireless Group) in 2009. Primarily aimed at males aged 13–45, Sport had a circulation of 304,700 making it the largest sports magazine in the UK. It was given to commuters outside London Underground and railway stations on Friday mornings and was also available in sports clubs and centres as well as hotels.

In 2011 the magazine launched an iPad app version, with the full print edition available for download each week plus video and audio features. The last edition of Sport was no. 484 that was released on 3 February 2017.
