= Islington Tribune =

British newspaper in London

The Islington Tribune is a free, independent newspaper that covers the London Borough of Islington in north London. It was founded in 2003 as a sister paper to the Camden New Journal. It carries significant influence locally due to its high news content, investigations and large readership: it has the highest circulation of the local papers in the borough.

== History ==
The paper was founded in 2003. In 2006 the Islington Tribune, along with its sister paper the Camden New Journal - broke the national story that Government minister Margaret Hodge had described the war in Iraq as British Prime Minister Tony Blair's biggest mistake.

Former reporters include Kim Janssen and Andrew Walker, as well as former Camden New Journal deputy editor Andrew Johnson. Peter Gruner, an award-winning environment journalist who previously worked for the Evening Standard, worked for the title until 2015.

== New Journal Enterprises group ==
The Camden New Journal, Islington Tribune, West End Extra, and The Review are all publications of New Journal Enterprises.

The Westminster Extra (formerly the West End Extra, a name still used on the website), which covers the entire City of Westminster, is also produced from the New Journal's Camden Town office. Despite the name, it also includes Kensington and Chelsea in its coverage area.

== See also ==
- Islington Gazette
