= DMG Media =

London-based publisher

dmg media Limited
- Type: Subsidiary
- Industry: Mass media
- Founded: 1905; 121 years ago (as Associated Newspapers); 2013; 13 years ago (as DMG Media)
- Headquarters: London, United Kingdom
- Key people: The Viscount Rothermere (Chairman); Rich Caccappolo (Chief executive); Paul Dacre (Editor-in-chief)
- Products: Newspapers and websites
- Revenue: ▲£652 million
- Parent: Daily Mail and General Trust
- Website: www.dmgmedia.co.uk

DMG Media (stylised in lowercase) is an intermediate holding company for Associated Newspapers, Northcliffe Media, Harmsworth Printing, Harmsworth Media and other subsidiaries of Daily Mail and General Trust. It is based at 9 Derry Street in Kensington, West London.

Associated Newspapers Limited was established in 1905 and owns the Daily Mail, MailOnline, The Mail on Sunday, Metro, Metro.co.uk, The i paper, inews.co.uk and New Scientist. Its portfolio of national newspapers, websites and mobile and tablet applications regularly reach 63% of the British adult population every month: it includes two major paid-for national newspaper titles as well as a free nationally available newspaper. The firm is also responsible for overseeing and developing the Group's online consumer businesses and for the group's UK newspaper printing operations.

Harmsworth Printing Limited produces all of its London, Southern England and South Wales editions of the national titles out of a print work site in Thurrock, Essex. In 2020 DMG Media acquired JPI Media's print operations in Dinnington, Portsmouth and Carn.

== History ==
Associated Newspaper Ltd was established in 1905 by brother newspaper barons Alfred and Harold Harmsworth. When Alfred died in 1922 without an heir, Harold Harmsworth acquired his controlling interest in Associated Newspapers for £1.6 million, and the next year bought the Hulton newspaper chain, which left Associated Newspapers in control of three national morning newspapers, three national Sunday newspapers, two London evening papers, four provincial daily newspapers, and three provincial Sunday newspapers.

Harold retired as chairman of Associated Newspapers in 1932 at the age of 64, and his son Esmond took over that role. He served as chairman until 1971, after which he assumed the titles of President and Director of Group Finance, and chairman of Daily Mail & General Trust Ltd, the parent company, from 1938 until his death. Harmsworth ran the businesses with sufficient skill that they remain firmly under family control today, majority ownership being voted by his grandson, Jonathan Harmsworth, 4th Viscount Rothermere (and a significant minority by Vyvyan Harmsworth, the 2nd Viscount's son by his third marriage). Jonathan Harmsworth is the chairman of the Daily Mail and General Trust (DMGT). Associated Newspapers changed its name to DMG Media in 2013.

In January 2022, DMGT delisted from the London Stock Exchange following a successful offer for DMGT by Rothermere Continuation Limited.

=== Associated-Rediffusion ===
In February 1954, with the passage of the Television Act 1954, Associated Newspapers joined forces with Taylorfilms and Rediffusion (the latter being a division of BET plc) into forming Associated-Rediffusion, winning the rights for London's weekday ITV service. They began broadcasting on 22 September 1955. During the partnership's first year, Associated-Rediffusion was losing money so fast that it was financially suffering; However, Associated-Rediffusion had managed to recover its financial security completely by October 1958. However, Associated-Rediffusion eventually lost its rights into broadcasting within London during August 1967.

== Titles ==
dmg media publishes the following titles:

- Daily Mail – the Daily Mail is a tabloid daily newspaper in the UK with a weekday print circulation of 900,000. Established in 1896 by Kennedy Jones, Harold and Alfred Harmsworth. It is edited by Ted Verity. Saturday's edition includes Weekend magazine, which focuses on the best of the week's TV and radio schedule.
- The Mail on Sunday – The Mail on Sunday is the UK's biggest-selling national Sunday newspaper. Edited by Ted Verity, it is known for its investigative, exposé journalism and its lifestyle magazines You and Event.
- MailOnline – MailOnline is the most-read English language newspaper website in the world with approximately 243 million unique visitors globally. Alongside its digital counterparts in the U.S. and Australia, it publishes roughly 1,700 stories, tens of thousands of photos, and more than 900 videos each day.
- Metro – Metro is the UK's highest-circulation print newspaper and is edited by Ted Young. The free newspaper is distributed from Monday to Friday.
- Metro.co.uk – online newspaper site reaching 32% of the UK adult population each month. Deborah Arthurs was appointed Editor of Metro.co.uk in 2014.
- The i Paper – a British national morning paper distributed across the UK. Edited by Oliver Duff, it is aimed at "readers and lapsed readers" of all ages and commuters with limited time.
- inews.co.uk – The website of the British compact newspaper, the i, also owned by dmg media.
- New Scientist – a weekly magazine focusing on science and technology. Emily Wilson is Editor-in-Chief.
- This Is Money – thisismoney.co.uk – financial website providing consumer financial advice.
- Irish Daily Mail – Irish version of the British publication launched in 2006.
- Irish Mail on Sunday – Sunday newspaper of Irish Daily Mail.
- Scottish Daily Mail – Scottish version of the British publication.
- Scottish Mail on Sunday – Sunday newspaper of Scottish Daily Mail.
- WLR FM – Local radio station based in County Waterford, Ireland which DMG acquired in 2025

== Other services ==
- DailyMailTV – Emmy award-winning entertainment news programme launched in 2017.
- Mail Plus – Mail Plus (or Mail+) is an app available via subscription on Apple and Android tablets. It features all the content of the printed edition plus interactive features, games and puzzles. Subscription figures are not disclosed.
- Mail Travel – Mail Travel started out as a Reader Offer department of the newspaper but has become a travel business offering holidays and cruises from over 20 suppliers. It relaunched its website in September 2014.
- Extra.ie – Irish news, sport, entertainment and business news site.
- Evoke.ie – women's entertainment and celebrity news.
- Rollercoaster.ie – Ireland's most popular website for pregnancy and parenting.
- OneFabDay.com – most popular wedding blog in Ireland and the UK.
- Geek Ireland – online publication dedicated to gaming content.
- Business Plus – Ireland's most widely distributed business magazine.
- WLR FM - Local radio station based in County Waterford, Ireland. DMG acquired a 75% stake in 2025 from the Irish Times Group

== Former titles ==
- Evening Standard – previously owned by Associated Newspapers, after facing financial difficulties the paper was purchased by Russian businessman Alexander Lebedev, on 21 January 2009, for the price of £1.
- London Lite – free sheet that was formerly called the Standard Lite, but was re-designed to compete with News International's new free sheet thelondonpaper. It was also a free sheet, handed out by vendors in the evening around the London Zone 1 area. The Lite closed on 13 November 2009.
- Elite Daily – an American website targeted at millennials, which was sold in 2017.
- Mail Today – a 48-page compact size newspaper launched in India on 16 November 2007 that is printed in Delhi, Gurgaon and Noida with a print run of 110,000 copies. Based on a subscription model, the newspaper has the same fonts and feel as the Daily Mail, and was set up with investment from Associated Newspapers and editorial assistance from the Daily Mail newsroom. Indian foreign media ownership laws restrict holdings to 26 percent.
- 7DAYS – free tabloid newspaper based in Dubai, United Arab Emirates, was established in 2003 and is the only English language newspaper in that country without any government ownership.
- SoHo Weekly News – alternate newspaper in New York City.

== Legal action ==
On 27 April 2007, Associated Newspapers was ordered to pay undisclosed damages to Hugh Grant. He sued over claims made about his relationships with his former girlfriends in three separate tabloid articles, which were published in the Daily Mail and The Mail on Sunday on 18, 21 and 24 February. Grant's lawyer stated that all of the articles' "allegations and factual assertions are false."

In a written statement, Grant said he took the action because: "I was tired of the Daily Mail and Mail on Sunday papers publishing almost entirely fictional articles about my private life for their own financial gain. I'm also hoping that this statement in court might remind people that the so-called 'close friends' or 'close sources' on which these stories claim to be based almost never exist."

The publisher has also lost libel cases and paid damages to personalities including television presenter Thea Rogers, and Oisin Fanning, former CEO of Smart Telecom.

On 1 October 2019, Prince Harry, Duke of Sussex announced via a statement that his wife, Meghan, Duchess of Sussex is suing Associated Newspapers over a private letter one of its newspapers, Mail on Sunday, had published. The handwritten letter, which Markle addressed to her father, Thomas Markle, was published by the paper in February 2019. The statement claims that the paper misused private information, copyright infringement and breached the UK's Data Protection Act 2018. Furthermore, the Duke and Duchess alleges the letter was published illegally and edited selectively to hide "lies" the paper had told about the Duchess. Prince Harry added that the legal action "hinges on one incident in a long and disturbing pattern of behavior" against his wife by British tabloid media.

Associated Newspapers was ordered to pay damages of £120,000 and published two apologies, in April and May 2019, to a charitable organisation for wrongly claiming links to terrorism.

On 24 February 2022, a spokesperson for Prince Harry, Duke of Sussex confirmed he had begun libel action against Associated Newspapers Ltd. The claim related to an article printed in The Mail on Sunday about his security arrangements.

On 6 October 2022, it was announced that various individuals, including Baroness Lawrence of Clarendon, Elton John and Prince Harry, Duke of Sussex, were taking legal action against Associated Newspapers Ltd. The action relates to allegations of "gross breaches of privacy", including phone hacking and the use of listening devices placed in homes and cars. In July 2026, the High Court ruled against the claimants. In August 2026, the court ordered them to make an interim payment of £9.54 million towards Associated Newspapers' legal costs.
