= City Press (London) =

British newspaper

- Type: Newspaper
- Owner: W H & L Collingridge Ltd
- Founder: William Hill Collingridge
- Founded: 1857
- Ceased publication: 1871
- Language: English
- Headquarters: London, England, United Kingdom
- OCLC number: 17566998

City Press was a British newspaper published during the 19th and early-20th centuries by W H & L Collingridge Ltd.

It was founded in 1857 by William Hill Collingridge to provide a newspaper for the City of London.

== See also ==
- List of newspapers in London
