= Metro (British newspaper) =

British tabloid newspaper

- News... but not as you know it

- Metro paper cover on 17 April 2026
- Type: Freesheet
- Format: Tabloid
- Owner: DMG Media
- Editor: Deborah Arthurs
- Founded: 16 March 1999; 27 years ago
- Political alignment: Non-partisan
- Headquarters: Northcliffe House, Kensington High Street, London, England
- Circulation: 891,386 (as of September 2025)
- ISSN: 1469-6215
- OCLC number: 225917520
- Website: metro.co.uk

Metro is a British freesheet tabloid newspaper published by DMG Media. The newspaper is distributed from Monday to Friday mornings at public places such as bus stations, railway stations and shopping malls in selected areas of England, Wales and Scotland (excluding public holidays and the period between Christmas Eve and New Year's Day inclusive). Copies have also been handed out to pedestrians and are common on buses in dedicated storage boxes and train and metro stations in tall rectangular storage bins. In 2018, Metro overtook The Sun to become the most-circulated newspaper in the United Kingdom.

Metro is owned by Daily Mail and General Trust plc (DMGT), part of the same media group as the Daily Mail and The Mail on Sunday, but in some areas Metro operates as a franchise with a local newspaper publisher, rather than as a wholly-owned concern. Though a sister publication to the conservative Daily Mail, the newspaper has never endorsed any political party or candidate, and says it takes a neutral political stance in its reporting.

== History ==
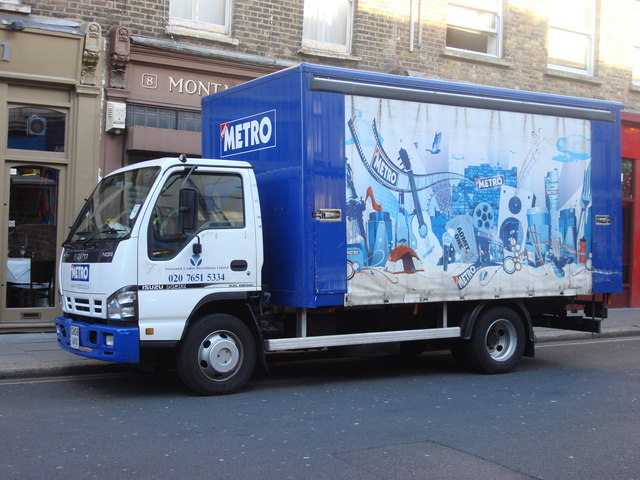
A Metro delivery van

=== Origins and London launch ===
The Metro free newspaper concept originated in Sweden, where a publication of the same name was launched in 1995 by Metro International. British newspaper executives Jonathan Harmsworth and Murdoch MacLennan, from DMGT, were reportedly inspired by the idea and flew to Stockholm on a 'fact-finding mission' to develop their version. There were also reports in the late 1990s that both Metro International and Rupert Murdoch's News International were considering launching free newspapers in the UK that might prove a commercial threat to DMGT's businesses.

DMGT subsequently launched Metro, using the same name as Metro International's publications but with a different logo, on Tuesday 16 March 1999. This UK version of Metro had no relation to Metro International or its sister newspapers in other countries. Metro was launched initially as a London-only newspaper with an original print run of 85,000 copies, which were distributed via dedicated bins in London Underground stations. The newspaper was produced at DMGT's printworks and office complex at Surrey Quays in southeast London, away from the company's main newspaper office in Kensington, west London.

=== National expansion ===
In the years following its launch, the paper's distribution was gradually expanded to other major UK cities, including Manchester and Birmingham. By February 2003, Metro had become operationally profitable for the first time. Its reach was extended further in 2004, becoming available in more urban areas, including Nottingham, Sheffield, Bristol and Bath.

Metro's circulation continued to rise in the following years, though readership temporarily dipped after the 7 July 2005 London bombings. There was a 1.8% decline – the equivalent of around 9,000 readers – in copies picked up in the weeks following the attacks due to a reduction in the number of people using London's public transport network, coupled with the temporary closure of some London Underground lines where Metro was distributed.

Following several years of expansion, in 2006 the newspaper's production was moved to DMGT's main newspaper offices at Northcliffe House in Kensington, west London. That same year the newspaper expanded further, launching in Cardiff and Liverpool in joint venture deals with Trinity Mirror.

At the time of its tenth anniversary in 2009, the newspaper was distributed in sixteen "major" UK cities and its circulation had grown to 1.3 million. Despite the increase in readership, that same year, management also closed five regional Metro offices in Manchester, Glasgow, Newcastle, Birmingham, and Bristol, which were responsible for producing regionalised arts, entertainment, and food pages, citing "challenging economic conditions" in the context of the Great Recession.

By 2011, Metro's distribution network had expanded to more than 50 cities in the UK. In that year media commentator Roy Greenslade said the publication was now making "bumper profits" and – mistakenly, as it is not national – dubbed it "Britain's most successful national newspaper".

=== Launch of Irish edition ===
Metro Ireland was launched in Dublin on 10 October 2005. It followed a legal battle over the title's name with the publishers of the Irish Independent and Dublin's Evening Herald, which launched its free newspaper called Herald AM. Both titles were loss-making, despite having a combined circulation of 145,000 in the Greater Dublin Area. On 2 July 2009, it was announced that the two freesheets would merge under the Metro banner, an operation completed by 2010. However, the Irish edition was closed down in December 2014.

=== London 2012 Olympic Games ===
For the first time in its history, Metro temporarily published seven days a week during the 2012 Summer Olympics and the 2012 Summer Paralympics, providing free copies to spectators at the Games as well as the general public. The newspaper struck a reported £2.25 million deal with sportswear manufacturer Adidas to run cover wrap adverts on each of the 17 days of the Olympics.

=== Rising circulation ===
After more than a decade in charge, editor Kenny Campbell was replaced as editor by Ted Young in 2014. Young's appointment coincided with several changes at the newspaper, including the separation of the print and online editions, along with an expansion of Metro's distribution in the UK.

In November 2016, comedian Richard Herring stepped down from writing his weekly column for Metro. Fellow TV comedian Dom Joly later replaced him in the slot.

In 2017, Metro became the most-read newspaper in the UK, according to monthly National Readership Survey figures. In March 2018, Metro officially overtook The Sun in total print circulation, according to ABC (Audit Bureau of Circulations (UK)) figures.

=== 2023 restructure ===
During the COVID-19 pandemic Metro suffered financial losses from reduced advertising during travel disruptions and cost increases. In 2023 the newsroom was restructured into one team for both print and online led by editor-in-chief Deborah Arthurs, resulting in some redundancies including editor Ted Young. In 2024 it was profitable in both print and online.

In late 2025, Metro announced that staff were at a high risk of redundancy amid declining website traffic.

== Content ==
=== Print edition ===
The majority of the newspaper's content is produced at Northcliffe House in Kensington, west London. There are no regional editions within England and Wales, except for occasional differences in sports and arts content catered to specific local audiences. A separate, small team produces a Scottish edition of Metro; however, often the only substantial difference between the two versions is the front page.

The newspaper comprises three main categories: news, features and sport. The news section includes Guilty Pleasures, which typically contains one to four pages of showbiz and entertainment news; letters pages; and a page dedicated to business news. A popular feature of the letters pages is Rush-Hour Crush, in which readers send in anonymous messages to fellow users of public transport who they consider attractive. The column has led to at least one marriage. The news section also features occasional feature columns from political pundits such as Sophy Ridge of Sky News. However, while offering analysis, these columns do not typically express endorsements of political positions or candidates, thus not being considered as op-ed columns as in other newspapers.

The features section contains a mix of articles on travel, homes, style, health and science, as well as arts coverage and entertainment listings. The puzzles page currently features a crossword and Sudoku.

=== Online ===
Metro launched a website version of the newspaper in July 2001. Between 2001 and 2014 most print edition articles were published on this website, along with additional online-only content such as blogs and opinion columns.

In 2014 production of the newspaper and the website were separated. As a result, from 2014 Metro newspaper and Metro Online were produced by separate organisations and written independently by different editorial teams while remaining part of the same parent company. Deborah Arthurs was appointed Editor of Metro.co.uk in 2014, following her time as Femail Editor for MailOnline.

In February 2021, the newspaper's separate website metro.news was abolished and merged back with metro.co.uk. Separate editorial teams continue to produce content for the website and print editions.

== Competition ==
Metro has faced competition in parts of the UK from other free newspapers, along with rivalry from paid-for national titles. Former editor Ted Young used to say that his 'mantra' was to produce a newspaper that its readers would be willing to pay for.

Metro International attempted to launch its own UK edition in 1999, being distributed in Newcastle upon Tyne's Tyne & Wear Metro system competing with DMGT's Metro. After battling alongside each other with the same name, Metro International's Metro changed its name to Morning News. This attempt was short-lived, however, and Morning News was discontinued shortly afterwards.

In 2005, Rupert Murdoch said he was worried by competition from Metro and that it had damaged the circulation of his newspaper the Sun. He told a press conference he was watching the free newspaper market "keenly and apprehensively". Murdoch's News International subsequently launched a London-based evening freesheet in 2006 called The London Paper. This was closed on 18 September 2009.

London Lite was another free evening newspaper published in London. It operated only from 2006 to 2009; it was owned by the same parent company as Metro, and was seen as a "spoiler" to protect against the commercial threat from The London Paper.

Another rival, to an extent, is the London Evening Standard, which became a freesheet in 2009, though unlike Metro it is only published in the London region, and since 2024 has been published weekly rather than daily.

== App products ==
Metro launched two new mobile app products in 2016: 11versus11, which is a football news app, and Guilty Pleasures, a celebrity news app. Both apps offer personalised content based on a user's interest profile.

== Controversies ==
In the run-up to the 2015 United Kingdom general election, the then UK Independence Party leader Nigel Farage declined to be interviewed by Metro, accusing it of bias against his party. This allegation was denied by the newspaper's editor. All other national party leaders agreed to be interviewed, including Conservative prime minister David Cameron and Labour leader Ed Miliband.

Prior to the 2016 United Kingdom European Union membership referendum, Metro published a cover-wrap advert on behalf of the Leave campaign, paid for by the Democratic Unionist Party. The following day, the newspaper published another cover-wrap advert, this time from the Remain campaign. Editor Ted Young said both adverts, which each cost more than £250,000 to place, generated around 300 complaints each, accusing the newspaper of both pro- and anti-Brexit bias. Concerns were subsequently raised over why the Democratic Unionist Party placed an advert in Metro, as the newspaper is not published in Northern Ireland.

In May 2019, the paper was condemned by the National Union of Journalists and the Public and Commercial Services Union, after an internal document leaked to The Guardian showed evidence that Amber Rudd, Secretary of State for Work and Pensions, had authorised the use of at least £250,000 of public money for a ten-week run of advertorials to be placed in Metro newspapers to "challenge the myths" around the government's controversial Universal Credit programme. The Trussell Trust also ran a counter-campaign called "Universal Credit Uncovered". In June 2019, the Daily Mirror reported that 80 UK charities had filed a complaint to the Advertising Standards Authority over "misleading Universal Credit adverts in Metro". In July 2019, the Advertising Standards Authority announced it was launching an investigation into the DWP adverts. On 5 November 2019, the Advertising Standards Authority ruled that the campaign was misleading, branding the ads "exaggerated" and in some cases "unsubstantiated". The Advertising Standards Authority upheld three complaint points whilst partially upholding a fourth.

== Editors ==
1999: Ian MacGregor
2001: Kenny Campbell
2014: Ted Young
2023: Deborah Arthurs
