= The London Paper =

British free daily newspaper

- Front page of The London Paper
- Type: Weekday free newspaper
- Format: Tabloid
- Owner: News International
- Publisher: NI Free Newspapers Ltd
- Editor: Stefano Hatfield
- Founded: 4 September 2006
- Ceased publication: 18 September 2009
- Circulation: approx. 500,000 (July 2009)
- Website: www.thelondonpaper.com

The London Paper (stylised as thelondonpaper) was a free daily newspaper, published by NI Free Newspapers Ltd, a subsidiary of News International (who also own the companies that publish The Sun and The Times). It was available from Monday to Friday each week in Central London from 4 September 2006 until 18 September 2009 (its final print-run before closure).

== Background ==
The paper was the first London newspaper to be published in direct competition with the Evening Standard since 1987 and Robert Maxwell's short-lived London Daily News. It was also the first newspaper to be launched by News International (the publisher's other titles were bought many years after initial publication).

The week before The London Paper was first published, Associated Newspapers, the publisher of the Evening Standard, re-branded their existing free lunchtime newspaper Standard Lite to London Lite and changed the publishing time to include the evening rush-hour, a move that was widely seen as a 'spoiler' to protect against the launch of the London paper.

== Format ==
The paper, edited by Stefano Hatfield, was targeted towards young readers, with emphasis on celebrity and more light hearted news, there was little analysis of news stories and the paper used many images and much colour. As a consequence of the launch of The London Paper as well as Associated Newspaper's own London Lite, the Evening Standard attempted to go more upmarket, emphasising the difference between the free newspapers and itself by adding the tagline "The Quality Newspaper" across the top of the front page, this changed on 12 October 2009 when, after a long history of paid circulation, the Evening Standard became a free sheet, replacing the London Lite. The London Paper was also the home of Em, the popular cartoon strip later featured in The Sun, and the City Girl column, written by novelist Alexandra Brown.

== Distribution ==
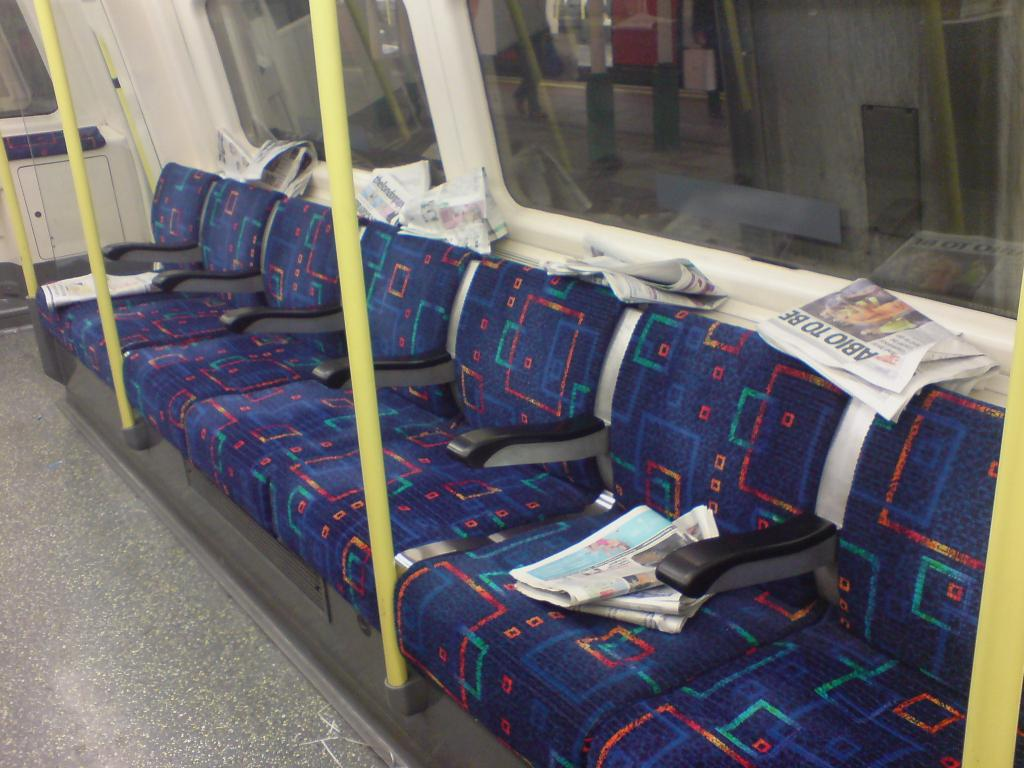
Free newspapers left behind by passengers on a Northern line train

It held the contract for evening free distribution in London National Rail stations, meaning it could be picked up at the same locations as Metro in the mornings. It was also believed to be bidding for the larger contract to distribute free newspapers at London Underground stations on weekday afternoons. However Transport for London later announced that the contract had been withdrawn after no acceptable bids were received.

== Criticism ==
The paper was criticised for containing too much pointless celebrity news in the guise of serious news articles, such as a new Murdoch-backed music website and The Simpsons Movie. Its television listings also included Sky One alongside the five analogue terrestrial channels.

Like the other free London dailies, The London Paper was generally discarded by its readers as soon as they had finished. The use of resources to print something with such a short lifespan was criticised on environmental grounds. Westminster City Council estimated that free newspapers made up a quarter of all rubbish in the West End, much of which went un-recycled, although some stations have positioned recycling bins at entrances and exits specifically for the purpose of recycling free papers. The London Paper recycled many of their papers into wire bound A4 notepads.

== Closure ==
But what’s remarkable about this current escapade is that Murdoch is actually proposing to sell a product that people have previously failed to even give away for free.

— Murdoch’s New iPaper: One Last Tragic Roll Of The Digital Dice,

On 20 August 2009, it was announced that The London Paper would cease publication due to consistent losses.

On 18 September 2009, News International decided to cease publication of the newspaper, having its final print-run after it recorded pre-tax losses of £12.9m in its second year.

On 13 August 2010, Rupert Murdoch announced that News Corp would distribute a similar digital newspaper as paid content for the iPad, mobile phones, and other digital devices.
