= London Lite =

British free daily newspaper, 2004–2009

- Type: Free daily newspaper
- Owner: Associated Newspapers
- Founded: 14 December 2004
- Ceased publication: 13 November 2009
- Language: English
- Headquarters: London
- Website: www.thisislondon.co.uk

London Lite was the trading name of a British free daily newspaper, published by Associated Newspapers (part of Daily Mail and General Trust), and now defunct. It was available Monday to Friday afternoons and evenings from street distributors in Central London only. On 27 October 2009, Associated Newspapers announced that it had entered into negotiation with staff over the future of the paper. The last edition was published on Friday, 13 November 2009, a date chosen by staff for its swan song.

== History ==
On 14 December 2004, Associated Newspapers launched a freesheet edition of the Evening Standard, titled Standard Lite, to help boost circulation freely. This had 48 pages, compared with about 80 in the main paper, which also had a supplement on most days.

It was announced in August 2006 that the free paper would now be titled London Lite, in a move that was widely seen as a spoiler to protect against the launch of News International's The London Paper on 4 September.

With the sale of the Evening Standard, but not London Lite, to Alexander Lebedev on 21 January 2009, the association between London Lite and the Standard was broken. London Lite—like its free sister morning newspaper, Metro—remained owned by Associated Newspapers, the media group that owns the Daily Mail.

== Content ==
London Lite, edited by Ted Young, was designed to be especially attractive to younger female readers, and featured a wide range of lifestyle articles, but less news and business news than the Standard. It was initially available only between 11:30 am and 2:30 pm from Evening Standard vendors and in the central area, but was later handed out by its own street distributors.

Celebrity gossip was given more coverage than international news, and London Lite also reported in detail the incidents of violent crime in the capital.

On 8 July 2009, the online version of London Lite merged with that of Metro, another London daily free newspaper owned by Associated Newspapers, but published in the morning.

== Criticisms ==
=== Alleged environmental impact ===
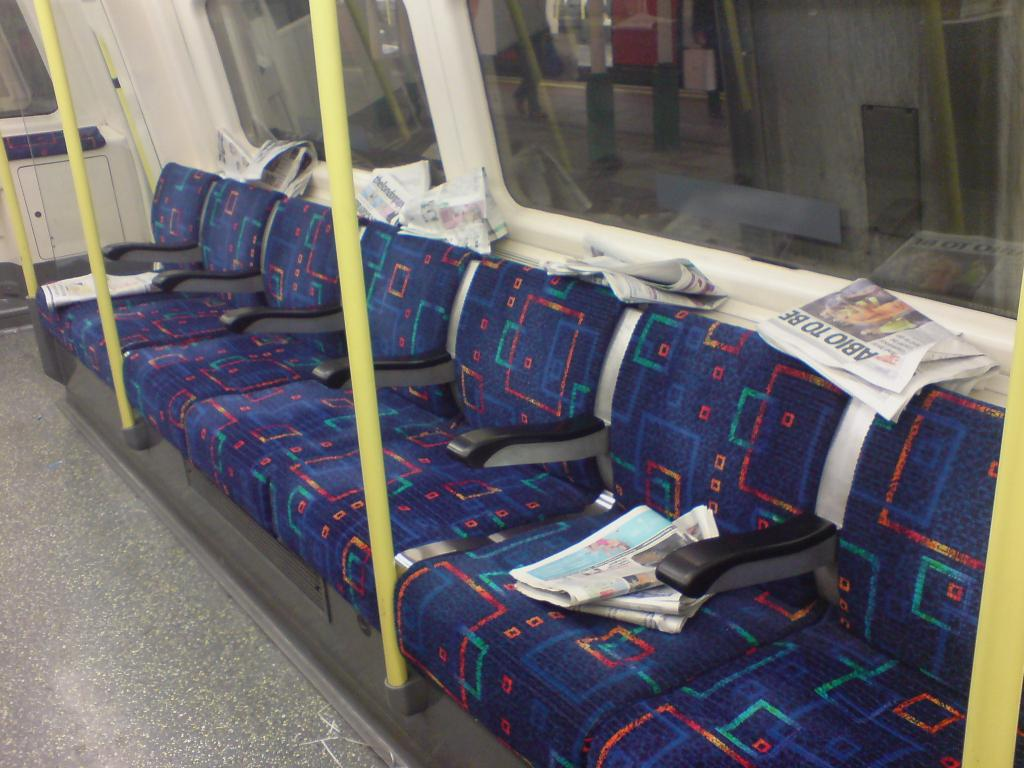
Free newspapers left behind by passengers on a London Underground train

Like the other free London dailies, London Lite was generally discarded by its readers as soon as they finished reading it. The use of resources to print something with such a short lifespan was criticised on environmental grounds. Westminster City Council estimated that free newspapers made up a quarter of all rubbish in the West End, much of which went un-recycled, although some stations positioned recycling bins at entrances and exits for this purpose.

== Competition ==
In June 2009, London Lite distributed an average of 400,741 copies each weekday, behind the 497,244 copies distributed by rival The London Paper. However, despite its higher circulation figures, The London Paper closed two months earlier than London Lite did, on 18 September 2009.

The closing of The London Paper ironically brought about the demise of London Lite. The Evening Standard saw a gap in the market, and decided to make its publication free less than one month later, on 12 October 2009. Less than three weeks later, London Lite announced it would close down.
