= Archant =

Publishing company in Norwich, England

Archant Limited
- Type: Private limited company
- Industry: Media
- Founded: 1845
- Founder: Jacob Henry Tillett, Jeremiah Colman, John and Jonathan Copeman
- Headquarters: Norwich, England, UK
- Key people: Lorna Willis (Chief Executive Officer)
- Products: Newspapers, magazines
- Revenue: £87.2 million (2018)
- Net income: £+1.7m (Underlying Profit) £-6.63m (Operating Profit) (2018)
- Owner: Gannett
- Number of employees: Approx. 950
- Parent: Newsquest
- Website: www.archant.co.uk

Archant Limited is a newspaper and magazine publishing company with headquarters in Norwich, England. The group publishes four daily newspapers, around 50 weekly newspapers, and 80 consumer and contract magazines. The company is a subsidiary of Newsquest, which is owned by American newspaper publishing company USA Today Company.

Archant employs around 1,250 employees, mainly in East Anglia, the Home counties and the West Country, and was known as Eastern Counties Newspapers Group until March 2002.

== History ==
=== 1845 to 1900 ===
The company began publishing in Norwich in 1845 with Norfolk News, backed by Jacob Henry Tillet, Jeremiah Colman, John and Johnathan Copeman.

The Eastern Weekly Press was launched in 1867 and in 1870 was renamed the Eastern Daily Press. A sister title, the Eastern Evening News, was launched in 1882.

=== 1900 to 2000 ===
As the business grew it moved premises in 1902, 1959 and again in the late 1960s to its present headquarters location at Prospect House in the centre of Norwich.

At the end of the 1960s, Eastern Counties Newspapers merged with the East Anglian Daily Times Company, publisher of the East Anglian Daily Times, to form Eastern Counties Newspapers Group (ECNG).

ECNG developed further with the launch of Community Media Limited in 1981, a weeklies publishing operation based in Bath, which launched and acquired titles in Scotland and the West Country.

In 1985, ECNG purchased the East Anglia-based Advertiser group of weekly free newspapers. These businesses operated as separate entities until the mid-1990s when they were brought together under the ECNG banner.

ECNG acquired four weekly newspapers in Huntingdon, Ely, Wisbech and March from Thomson in 1993. The acquisition of Peterhead-based P Scrogie followed shortly afterwards.

In 1995 the company opened a new 25m Print Center in Thorpe, Norwich, with Goss HT70 Presses and Muller-Martini Mailroom Equipment, Replacing the Goss Metro Presses at Prospect House.

The company moved into Internet publishing in 1996 when it launched Eastern Counties Network, a Web-based service using copy from its four daily newspapers as well as original material. Later this was disaggregated into separate websites for each of the newspapers.

In April 1998, ECNG bought Home Counties Newspapers Holdings plc with an agreed bid of approximately £58 million. HCNH published a range of 26 weekly paid and free titles across Greater London and the Home Counties. The title portfolio included the Hampstead & Highgate Express, the South Essex Recorder series, the Herts Advertiser series, the Comet series, the Herald group and the Welwyn & Hatfield Times.

Consumer magazine publisher Market Link Publishing, now Archant Specialist, based in Essex was acquired by ECNG for £5 million in autumn 1999. Its titles now include Photography Monthly, Professional Photographer, Pilot, Sport Diver, Complete France, which sponsors a French forum, French Property News, Living France, and France Property Shop.

=== 2000 to present ===
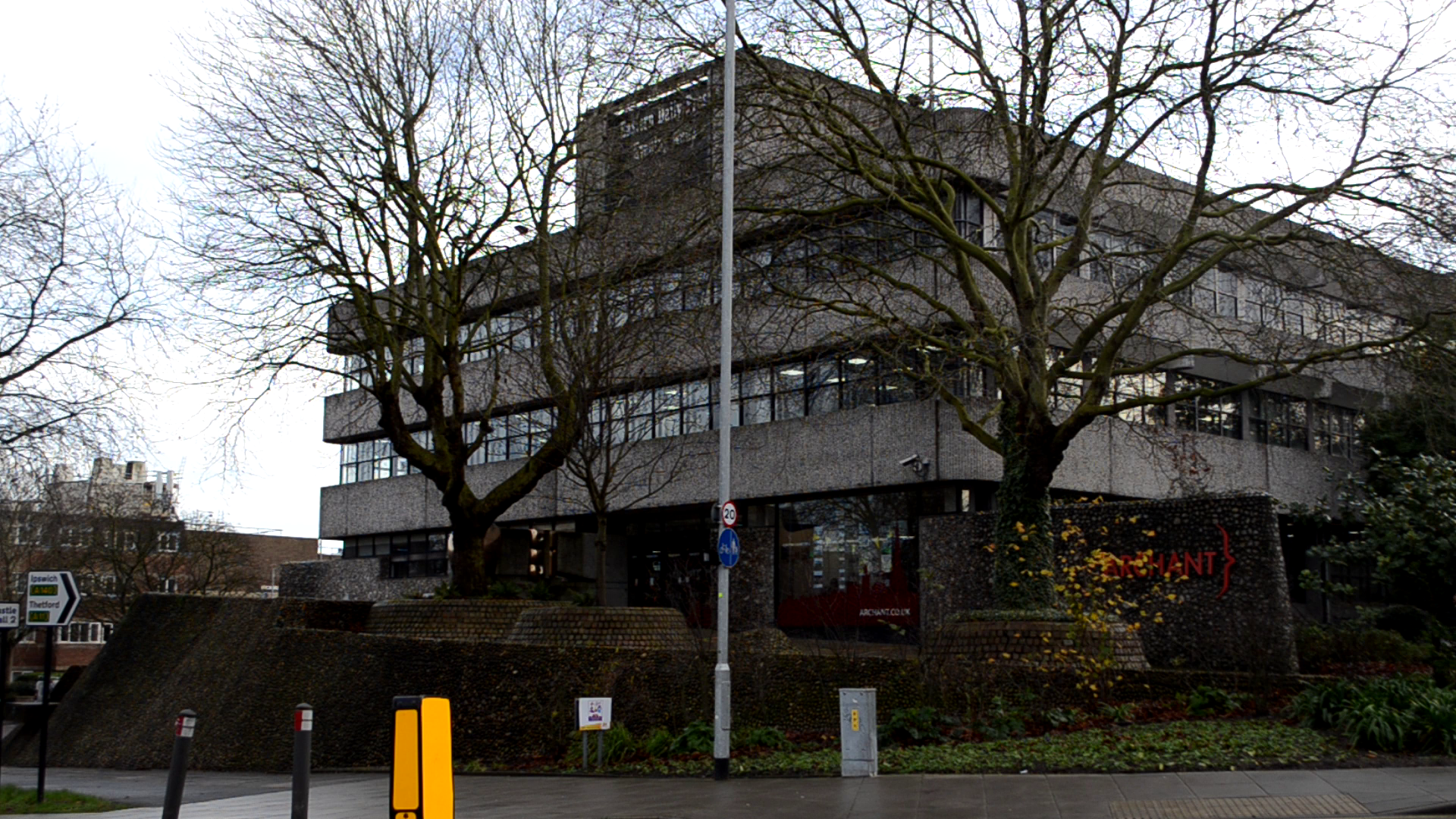
Prospect House, the current headquarters of Archant.

The launch of a county magazine in Norfolk in 2000 saw the beginning of what is now Archant Life, the country's biggest publisher of county magazines. The division was subsequently scaled through multiple acquisitions in the North West, the Cotswolds and the South and South East of England.

In March 2002, ECNG changed its name to Archant. In December 2003, Archant purchased 27 weekly newspapers from Independent News & Media in two separate deals worth up to £62 million. The titles included the Hackney Gazette, Islington Gazette, the East London Advertiser, the Barking & Dagenham Post, the Bexley Times and the Bromley Times.

In April 2007, Archant Scotland's eight newspaper titles were sold to Johnston Press for around £11 million.

In February 2008, Archant acquired Compass Magazines and its four monthly regional magazines in Dorset, Hampshire and Surrey.

In September 2009, Archant Print completed an £8 million project to bring its press centre in Norwich up to ten printing towers with associated equipment.

In November 2009, Archant launched Great British Life, a website portal. In the same month, Archant launched Subscription Save, a dedicated magazine subscriptions portal for their publications.

In May 2010, Archant launched Cambridge First, a weekly newspaper in Cambridge.

In June 2010, Archant acquired KOS Media Publishing Ltd, the publisher of Kent on Sunday and a series of free weekly newspapers, magazines, websites and mobile products, for an undisclosed sum.

In February 2011, Archant London launched an all-new news & information website for London – London24.

In May 2011, Archant Life acquired the Wye Valley Life and Life in The Marches titles from Wye Valley Media Ltd.

In November 2011, Archant completed a change to its legal structure to simplify the trading companies into one single legal entity, now called Archant Community Media Limited. This does not change the name of the group which remains as Archant Ltd.

In January 2013, saw a move into local TV with the launch of Mustard TV online in Norwich.

In August 2013, Archant announced the completion of the acquisition of www.planningfinder.com.

In July 2016 Archant announced a new weekly 'pop-up newspaper', The New European, designed in response to the UK's vote to leave the European Union. It was initially intended to run for four editions only;

In August 2017, Mustard TV closed, having been sold to the That's TV Group.

In December 2017, Archant won a €676,000.00 grant from Google's Digital News Initiative. The project, Local Recall, aims to bring 150 years of newspapers back to life through the latest technology; chatbots. Archant, in partnership with local artificial intelligence leaders ubisend, take on this two-year challenge to make their archived newspapers available via voice and text chatbots.

In September 2019, Archant announced its intention to out-source all newspaper printing to Newsprinters (Broxbourne) Ltd. from 10 November 2019, and close the Archant Print Center in Thorpe St. Andrew's Norwich, bringing to an end 174 years of newspaper printing in the city. In a letter to staff, Archant said the decision had been taken due to "changes" in the newspaper industry and the move will provide "substantial cost savings". Approximately 95 Norwich Jobs will be lost as a direct result of this change.

In January 2020 Archant sold its headquarters, Prospect House, to regional insurance firm Alan Boswell Group.

In July 2020, Archant announced it had put itself up for sale and was willing to plug a funding deficit exacerbated by the COVID-19 pandemic's impact on industry-wide advertising revenues.

On 30 August it was announced that the operational units of Archant had been sold to private equity firm Rcapital Partners, (and the pension funds transferred to UK Government Pension Protection Fund); the holding companies were put into administration, making the existing shares worthless.

In March 2022, Rcapital sold the group to American media giant Gannett via its British subsidiary Newsquest.

== Publications ==
=== Magazines ===
Online and print magazines include:

- Airgun World
- Archant Life county magazines:
  - Hampshire Life
  - Kent Life
  - Somerset Life
  - Sussex Life
  - Essex Life
  - Norfolk Magazine
  - Suffolk Magazine
  - Cheshire Life
  - Cornwall Life
  - Cotswold Life
  - Derbyshire Life
  - Devon Life
  - Dorset Magazine
  - East Suffolk Living
  - Exeter & East Devon Life
  - Hertfordshire Life
  - Lancashire Life
  - Life in North Wales
  - Surrey Life
  - West Essex Life
  - Yorkshire Life

=== Daily newspapers ===
- East Anglian Daily Times
- Eastern Daily Press (EDP)
- Norwich Evening News
- Ipswich Star

=== Weekly paid newspapers ===
Many of the paid for titles have free online edition (web pages, some also have a digital facsimile of the print edition including advertisements)

- Barking & Dagenham Post – Barking and Dagenham, London
- Beccles and Bungay Journal – Beccles and Bungay
- Brent & Kilburn Times – Brent and Kilburn, London
- Cambs Times – Cambridgeshire
- Dereham & Fakenham Times – Dereham and Fakenham
- Docklands and East London Advertiser— East London
- Ely Standard – Ely
- Exmouth Journal – Exmouth
- Great Yarmouth Mercury – Great Yarmouth
- Green Un – an Ipswich-based Association football weekly
- Hackney Gazette – Hackney, London
- Hampstead & Highgate Express (Ham & High) – Hampstead and Highgate, London (Paid with limited free distribution)
- Ilford Recorder – Ilford
- Islington Gazette – Islington, London
- Lowestoft Journal – Lowestoft
- Newham Recorder – Newham, London
- North Norfolk News – North Norfolk
- The Pink'un – a Norwich-based Association football weekly (digital only)
- Romford Recorder – Romford
- Royston Crow – Royston
- Sidmouth Herald – Sidmouth
- Welwyn Hatfield Times – Welwyn Garden City, Hatfield and Potters Bar
- The Weston & Somerset Mercury – Weston-super-Mare and Somerset
- Wood & Vale – St John's Wood, Marylebone and Maida Vale, London (Paid with limited free distribution)

=== Weekly free newspapers ===
- Diss Mercury— Diss
- Dunmow Broadcast & Recorder – Great Dunmow
- Exmouth Herald – Exmouth
- The Advertiser – Coastal edition (East Suffolk)
- The Advertiser – Great Yarmouth edition
- The Advertiser – Ipswich edition – no longer in existence as of 24 June 2020.
- The Advertiser – North Norfolk edition
- The Advertiser – South Norfolk edition
- The Advertiser – Waveney edition
- Comet Series – North Hertfordshire
- Havering Post – Havering, London
- Herts Advertiser Series – St Albans & Harpenden
- The Hunts Post – Huntingdonshire
- Midweek Herald – East Devon
- North Devon Gazette & Advertiser – North Devon
- North Somerset Times – North Somerset
- Norwich Extra – Delivered every three weeks from 11 November 2019; a decision "driven by our publishing strategy to serve or local communities as effectively as possible while also maximizing the response for advertising clients".
- Property Extra
- Saffron Walden Reporter – Saffron Walden
- Sidmouth Herald – Sidmouth
- Watton Times – Thetford & Watton, Norfolk
- West Suffolk Mercury Series – West Suffolk
- Weston-super-Mare Admag – Weston-super-Mare
- Wisbech Standard – Wisbech
- Wymondham & Attleborough Mercury – Wymondham & Attleborough

=== Former newspapers ===
- Herts Herald – East Hertfordshire
- Kent on Sunday – Kent, Southeast London
- yourashford – Ashford, Kent
- yourcanterbury – Canterbury
- yourdeal – Deal, Kent
- yourdover – Dover
- yourmaidstone – Maidstone
- yourmedway – Medway
- yoursandwich – Sandwich, Kent
- yourshepway – Folkestone and Hythe
- yourswale – Swale
- yourthanet – Thanet
- The New European - national
