= Sidmouth Herald =

British newspaper

- Type: Weekly newspaper
- Owner: USA Today Co.
- Publisher: Newsquest
- Founded: 1849
- Circulation: 1,594 (as of 2024)
- Website: sidmouthherald.co.uk

The Sidmouth Herald is a British newspaper, established in 1849. A team of reporters cover Sidmouth, Beer, Branscombe, Ottery St Mary, and the surrounding areas.

It is published by Newsquest. It has sister papers in the county called the Exmouth Journal, the Midweek Herald and the North Devon Gazette. Also in the South-West are the Weston & Somerset Mercury, the Somerset Mercury and the North Somerset Times.
