= Phil Hall (journalist) =

British journalist

- Born: London, England, United Kingdom
- Occupation: Chairman of The PHA Group
- Years active: 1974–present

Phil Hall is a British journalist, the former editor of the News of the World and the founder and chairman of The PHA Group, a London PR agency.

Hall entered journalism in 1974, as a reporter on the Dagenham Post. He then moved to the Ilford Recorder and subsequently filled a sub-editor post on the Newham Recorder, but returned to reporting at the Sunday People. In 1992, he was appointed news editor of the Sunday Express and the following year, he joined the News of the World as assistant editor, becoming deputy editor and, in 1995, editor.

Hall remained in the job until May 2000 when he joined Hello! magazine as editor and later was appointed Editorial Director of Development at Trinity Mirror, before moving into PR consultancy.

He founded The PHA Group in 2005, specialising in areas of PR including crisis and campaign management, personal profile building, media relations and more recently, digital communications.

Media offices
Preceded by Paul Connew	Deputy Editor of the News of the World; 1994–1995	Succeeded by Rebekah Wade
Preceded by Piers Morgan	Editor of the News of the World; 1995–2000	Succeeded by Rebekah Wade
Preceded by Maggie Koumi	Editor of Hello! 2001–2002	Succeeded by Maria Trkulja
