= LeeFest =

Summer music festival in Kent, England

Coordinates: 51.169°N 0.115°E

Neverworld (Music Festival)
- Locations: John Darling's Farm, Wilderness Lane, Kent, England
- Years active: 2006 – present
- Founders: Lee Denny
- Website: www.neverworld.co.uk

Neverworld, formerly known as LeeFest, is a music festival that takes place each Summer in Kent, England. The festival began in founder Lee Denny's garden when his parents went away on holiday in 2006. Despite the festival's small scale in its first two years, by 2011 LeeFest grew into a two-day event with enough capacity for 2,000 people. The festival's capacity has since expanded to 5,000, moving to a new site in 2016. Around 200 volunteers help out during the festival.

The festival has won two awards and been nominated for several more. Awards include: 'Best Independent Festival' at AIM Independent Music Awards, 2012 and 'Best Grass Roots Festival' at the UK Festival Awards 2009.

Denny was awarded the Spirit of London Awards ‘Achievement in The Arts in December 2012. In the same year he was also placed in Time Out UK 2012: 100 Culture List in the UK's Time Out magazine, considering him "One of the inspiring 100 people in the UK who have made others lives better".

== History ==
=== 2006–2007 ===
LeeFest began in 2006 with seven bands playing on a small stage in the garden of teenager Lee Denny's family home on 31 August in Beckenham, London. 150 people attended and the money raised from ticket sales went to the charity Teenage Cancer Trust. The following year the festival took place again in Lee's garden with an increase of attendees to around 350 and money raised was donated to Save The Children.

=== 2008–2009 ===
By 2008 the event had outgrown the garden and moved to fields near Langley Park School for Boys where 600 people attended. This site was used again to host the event in August 2009, with over 1,500 people attending, 70 volunteers, and profits donated to Kids Company.

=== 2010 ===
LeeFest 2010 took place on 14 August at a new venue, Highams Hill Farm. 1,500 people attended, including 700 camping tickets. 150 people volunteered. The line-up included Bastille, The Futureheads, Hot Club De Paris, Jakwob, Does it Offend You, Yeah?, The King Blues, Johnny Foreigner, Starsmith, The Loose Cannons, and Fenech Soler.

=== 2011 ===
In 2011 the festival took place on 12–13 August at Highams Hill Farm. Taking place for the first time across two days, the festival expanded to a larger line-up that included British Sea Power, Young Knives, Fenech Soler, DJ Fresh, David's Lyre, and The Whip.

=== 2012 ===
The festival took place 29–30 July at Highams Hill Farm. In this year the festival expanded its site to include four stages and a capacity of 2,500. The line-up included; Mystery Jets, Public Service Broadcasting (band), The 2 Bears, and GhostPoet.

=== 2013 ===
in 2013 LeeFest ran 25–28 July. Taking place at the same venue as the past three years, LeeFest 2013 attracted over 2,500 people to Highams Hill Farm. Acts included London Grammar, Clean Bandit, Noisettes, Delphic, Public Service Broadcasting, The Other Tribe, King Charles, The Skints, Man Like Me, Stanton Warriors, Dark Sky, Lulu James and much more. The festival remained for-profit.

=== 2014 ===
Acts included The Cribs, Frightened Rabbit, Dan Le Sac vs Scroobius Pip, MØ, Years & Years, Young Fathers, Maribou State, Rae Morris, Jack Garratt, Krafty Kuts, Blonde & Childhood. Over 2,500 people attended.

=== 2016 ===
After taking a year out, LeeFest was back for its 10th anniversary, rebranded as LeeFest presents: The Neverland. Moving to a new, larger site near Tunbridge Wells, LeeFest now has three realms; The Neverwoods, Mermaids Lagoon and Skull Ridge. The lineup for 2016 included Lianne La Havas, Ghostpoet, Shura, The 2 Bears, Little Simz, Formation, loyle carner, The Big Moon, Dj Luck and MC Neat, Big Deal, Dinosaur Pile Up, Spring King, Queen Kwong, Demob Happy, Girli, Beaty Heart and Miamigo.

=== 2018 ===
Following 2017's event, it was announced that the festival had been re-branded under the name Neverworld. Clean Bandit were announced as headliners, with performances from Tom Grennan, Declan McKenna and Sub Focus also advertised.

== Notable bands ==
- 2009

The Holloways, Saving Aimee, The Xcerts

- 2010

The Futureheads, Does It Offend You, Yeah?, Jakwob, The King Blues, Fenech Soler, Johnny Foreigner, Hot Club De Paris, King Charles, Starsmith

- 2011

Fenech Soler, Young Knives, Get Cape. Wear Cape. Fly., Little Comets, King Charles, To Kill a King, David's Lyre, Dutch Uncles, Ellen and the Escapades, British Sea Power, DJ Fresh

- 2012

Mystery Jets, Ghostpoet, Jakwob, Slow Club, DJ Friction, Summer Camp, Casiokids, Bastille, The Skints, We Were Evergreen, Tom Williams & The Boat, Sound of Guns, BIGkids, Broken Hands, Raf Daddy (The 2 Bears)

- 2013

London Grammar, Clean Bandit, Noisettes, Delphic, Public Service Broadcasting

- 2014

The Cribs, Frightened Rabbit, Dan Le Sac vs Scroobius Pip, MØ, Years & Years, Young Fathers, Maribou State, Rae Morris, Jack Garratt, Krafty Kuts

- 2016

Everything Everything, Lianne La Havas, Circa Waves, Ghostpoet, Shura, Roots Manuva, Little Simz We Are Scientists, Nimmo

- 2017

Jake Bugg, Slaves, Annie Mac, Jungle, Kae Tempest, Wild Beasts, Wilkinson, Mr Scruff, Maribou State, Crazy P, Zak Abel, Oxide & Neutrino, Tom Grennan, Kidnap Kid, Fickle Friends, Pumarosa, Lewis Watson, Moxie, Shame

- 2018

Clean Bandit, Bastille, Declan McKenna, Tom Grennan, Sub Focus

== Awards (nominations and won) ==
=== 2014 ===
- AIM Independent Music Awards - Finalist Nominee - Best Independent Festival (2014)

=== 2013 ===
- AIM Independent Music Awards - Finalist Nominee - Best Independent Festival (2013)

=== 2012 ===
- AIM Independent Music Awards Winner - Best Independent Festival (2012)
- UK Festival Awards 2012 - Finalist Nominee - Best Festival Line Up (2012)

=== 2009 ===
- UK Festival Awards 2009 - Best Grassroots Festival (2009)
- UK Festival Awards 2009 - Finalist Nominee - Best Small Festival (2009)
- UK Festival Awards 2009 - Finalist Nominee - Best Festival Toilets (2009)

=== 2006 ===
The festival has also been acknowledged with a nomination in the European Festival Awards

== Press ==
In the build-up to the fourth LeeFest on 15 August 2009 the festival received national press coverage including features on BBC Radio 1, BBC Radio 6 Music, London Tonight and the Kent on Saturday.

In October 2009 the festival won the Best Grassroots Festival Award at the UK Festival Awards. LeeFest was also nominated for Best Small Festival and Best Toilets. The Festival has also been acknowledged with a nomination in the European Festival Awards.

In May 2010 the Guardian included LeeFest in a round-up of ten of the best small UK festivals. The article championed the festival's "unpretentious party vibe" and charitable nature. LeeFest was also featured on the BBC News in the entertainment round up during August.

In 2012 LeeFest and Xfm collaborated to launch the festival's VIPee luxury loo competition.

In 2013 Lee Denny appeared on ITV news to promote the crowd funding project #GrowLeeFest. This project received a great deal of press online too, as well as support from a range of artists and key figures in the music industry. Also in this year LeeFest was featured in Time Out London as a top event to attend that Summer.

November 2015: LeeFest is the subject of an advertisement for the Android phone operating system under the strapline "Be together, not the same" and alludes at the end of the ad to the new location...

2016: The Neverland chapter begins, with Lee leading the Lost Boys, Pirates and Mermaids to a bigger party than ever before!
