= Midweek Herald =

- Type: Weekly newspaper
- Owner: USA Today Co.
- Publisher: Newsquest
- Circulation: 10,057 (as of 2023)
- Website: midweekherald.co.uk

The Midweek Herald was the first free newspaper in East Devon.

The newspaper covers Sidmouth, Beer, Branscombe, Axmouth, Ottery St Mary, Charmouth, Marshwood and Honiton as well as the surrounding areas.

It is owned by Newsquest and is a sister paper of the Sidmouth Herald, Exmouth Journal, and North Devon Gazette.
