= Royston Crow =

Royston Crow may refer to:

- Hooded crow or Royston crow, Corvus cornix
- Royston Crow (newspaper), a newspaper published in Royston, Hertfordshire, England
