= Kent on Saturday =

Newspaper

- Type: Weekly newspaper
- Format: Tabloid
- Publisher: KOS Media
- Founded: March 2005
- Headquarters: Ashford, Kent
- Sister newspapers: Kent on Sunday (former)

Kent on Saturday (known as the Kentish Saturday Observer until April 2009) is a regional newspaper covering the county of Kent and parts of Southeast London. It is published every Saturday and is part of the KOS Media publishing company.

KOS Media's other titles included the Kent on Sunday newspaper and the KentNews.co.uk website, both of which closed in November 2017.

== History and background ==
The Saturday Observer was launched in March 2005 and is distributed across all of Kent. The paper was relaunched under its current name in 2009. It is now a paid-for title in the newsagents, whilst free copies are now distributed via home delivery rounds, and business drops. Kent on Saturday also has an e-edition available free online or by subscription.

Its editor is Gary Wright, who has previously worked on national tabloid The People, regional press agency Kent News & Pictures, local TV news show Meridian Tonight and the KM Group title the Kentish Express.

== Content ==
Kent on Saturday covers television shows, local celebrities, shopping and leisure, in addition to news and sport. The newspaper's focus - as with former sister title Kent on Sunday - remains on editorial content. Also included as a supplement is "Review", a pull-out title which includes restaurant reviews, TV and film reviews, and a property section.
