= East Anglian Daily Times =

Newspaper in England

- Type: Daily newspaper
- Owner: USA Today Co.
- Publisher: Newsquest
- Editor: Anna Starnes
- Founded: 13 October 1874
- Language: English
- Headquarters: Princes Street, Ipswich
- Circulation: 5,904 (as of 2024)
- Website: eadt.co.uk

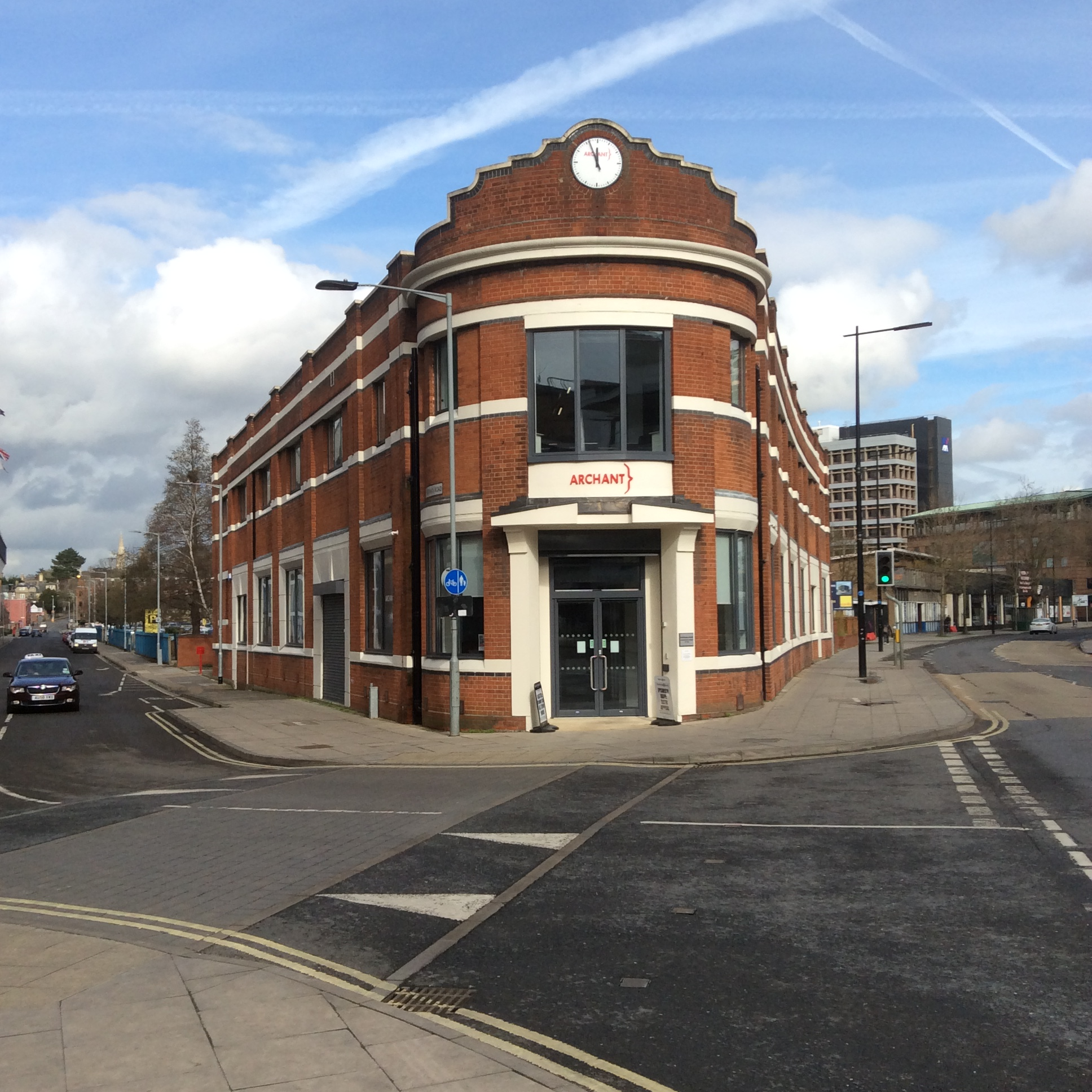
The former'Archant' office in Princes Street, Ipswich, home of the East Anglian Daily Times

The East Anglian Daily Times is a British local newspaper for Suffolk and Essex, based in Ipswich.

== History ==
The newspaper began publication on 13 October 1874, incorporating the Ipswich Express, which had been published since 13 August 1839.

The East Anglian Daily Times merged news operations with the Ipswich Star in 2010, under the stewardship of the chief executive of Archant Suffolk, Stuart McCreery. Mr McCreery left his role one day before Archant's board announced a reversal of the editorial integration, which it described as "pioneering", and a company spokesman informed staff that Mr McCreery had suggested the reintegration when he had decided to resign some weeks before.

The paper is published daily from Monday to Saturday in four regional editions: West Suffolk (around Bury St Edmunds), North Suffolk (around Lowestoft), East Suffolk (around Ipswich) and Essex (Colchester). In the period December 2010-June 2011, it had an average daily circulation of 29,932. By December 2018, circulation had dropped to 12,589.

The East Anglian Daily Times Company merged with Eastern Counties Newspapers in the 1960s; the group is now part of Archant.
