= The Comet (newspaper) =

Newspaper in northern Hertfordshire

- Type: Weekly newspaper
- Format: Tabloid
- Owner: USA Today Co.
- Publisher: Newsquest
- Editor: Georgia Barrow
- Founded: May 1971; 55 years ago; (as the Stevenage Sun)
- Language: English
- Headquarters: Stevenage, United Kingdom
- Circulation: 66,791 weekly; (98.4% free; 2014)
- Sister newspapers: Royston Crow
- Website: www.thecomet.net

The Comet is a weekly newspaper covering the English towns of Stevenage, Hitchin, Letchworth and Baldock, as well as the surrounding villages in north Hertfordshire and south-east Bedfordshire. It is based in Stevenage. The vast majority of its copies are delivered locally or picked up as a free newspaper, but it is also sold. It is published each Thursday in three editions—one concentrates on the Stevenage area, another focuses on Hitchin and a third pays particular attention to Letchworth and Baldock. It is published by Newsquest.

== History ==
The paper was formed in May 1971 as the successor to the long-established Hertfordshire Pictorial, a paid-for weekly whose three editions covered Letchworth and Baldock, Hitchin and Stevenage. The free paper was originally named the Stevenage Sun, Hitchin Sun or Letchworth Sun, depending on the edition. The Comet name was adopted after less than a month after the national newspaper The Sun threatened legal action. Subsequent attempts by the Surrey Comet to prevent the Comet name being used were seen off.

The Comet's average circulation, counting all three editions together, was 66,791 in 2014—29,087 for the Stevenage edition, 17,953 for Hitchin, and 19,751 for the Letchworth and Baldock version. Of those 98.4% were delivered or picked up free and 1.6% were paid for. The three editions of The Comet are offered free of charge on the paper's website as "e-editions" on the same day as publication.

Under Isted's editorship, The Comet was named the UK's "free newspaper of the year" at the Regional Press Awards in 2007.

Georgia Barrow is the current editor; previous permanent editors were Darren Isted (2002–14), Nick Gill (2017-2020) and John Francis, who retired in June 2016.
