= Ham & High =

Local newspaper in London, England

Hampstead & Highgate Express

- Front cover on 6 May 2021
- Type: Weekly newspaper
- Format: Tabloid
- Owner: USA Today Co.
- Publisher: Newsquest
- Editor: Simon Murfitt
- Founded: 1860; 166 years ago
- Headquarters: Queens House, 55/56 Lincolns Inn Fields, London, WC2A 3LJ
- Circulation: 3,944 (as of 2021)
- ISSN: 1366-9192
- Website: www.hamhigh.co.uk

The Ham & High, officially the Hampstead & Highgate Express, is a weekly paid local newspaper published in the London Borough of Camden by Newsquest Media Group. It covers the north London areas of Hampstead and Highgate. The newspaper is published every Thursday.

== History ==
The Ham & High was founded in 1860 and from 1862-97 it was under the editorship of George Jealous and printed at Hampstead's only printers, Holly Mount, a former chapel. George Jealous is credited as having inspired the interest of the Harmsworth family in printing, gifting Alfred Harmsworth (Lord Northcliffe) a printing press. Despite being founded on principles of independence, the Ham & High was sold to Archant in 2000.

In 2013, the Ham & High were involved in helping to arrange a march, with other local newspapers, that was attended by 5,000 people, to oppose the selling off of parts of the Whittington Hospital, which was expected to result in 500 people losing their jobs.

In early 2018, Archant shut down the Ham & High office in Finchley Road, in favour of relocating them to east London. Later, in June, Archant announced it would be merging all north London news teams, resulting in the Ham & High no longer having a dedicated editor, to the dismay of former editors.

Archant was acquired by an investment firm in 2020, after going into administration and was subsequently put up for sale in January 2022, later being acquired by Newsquest Media Group, who are based in London.

== Editors ==
Along with George Jealous, past editors have included Gerald Isaaman, Matthew Lewin and Ross Lydall. When Matthew Lewin was made redundant as editor, 59 members of Camden Council wrote to the paper in dismay. Geoff Martin later had a memorable 10-year stint as editor, winning a raft of weekly newspaper of the year awards The current editor, who also covers other local papers, is Simon Murfitt.
