= Mustard TV =

Local television station based in Norwich, England

- Headquarters: Prospect House, Rouen Road, Norwich, NR1 1RE

Ownership
- Owner: Archant Community Media Ltd

History
- Launched: 24 March 2014
- Closed: 31 August 2017

Links
- Website: www.mustardtv.co.uk

Availability

Terrestrial
- Freeview: Channel 7

Mustard TV was a local television station based in Norwich, Norfolk. It broadcast to over 400,000 people, covering Norwich and much of Norfolk reaching Cromer in the north of the county, Dereham to the west and parts of south Norfolk and north Suffolk. It was a wholly owned subsidiary of regional media group Archant and was one of 19 initial local TV stations awarded licences by UK broadcasting regulator Ofcom.

Mustard TV's original aim was to "redefine what people think of as local television". The channel was named as a nod to the Colman family which manufactured mustard in Norwich, although there was no business connection. The production team and studios were at Archant's headquarters in Prospect House, Rouen Road in Norwich.

On 31 August 2017 Mustard TV broadcast its last show, having been sold to the That's TV group. The new owner said that it would not be employing the previous Mustard staff.

== History ==
=== 2012 ===
On 23 May 2012 the media regulator Ofcom extended the invitation for local operators in cities across the United Kingdom to operate a new local television service in their areas. Two rival bids were lodged - one from regional publisher Archant and the other from NR One which was headed up by former ITV Anglia presenter Kevin Piper. On 19 September 2012 Archant was revealed as the winner of the licence, originally proposing a television service which would run from 6 am until midnight each day.

=== 2014 ===
Mustard TV launched on Freeview on Channel 8 on 24 March 2014, the second of the new local television stations to launch in the UK. It offered a catch-up service on the Mustard TV website, and by the end of the year had extended its reach by transmitting on Virgin Media cable too.

=== 2015 ===
The station received some controversy in its earlier years with widespread press attention in March 2015 after accidentally broadcasting an exchange between presenters Helen McDermott and Darren Eadie where an obscene word was used. In July 2015 it experienced technical difficulties in attempting a live broadcast of a pre-season Norwich City friendly football match against West Ham. A recording of the match went out around 90 minutes later with bosses forced to apologise for the technical hitch.

=== 2016 ===
On 5 April 2016, following the closure of BBC Three on Freeview, Mustard TV and other local television stations moved from Channel 8 to Channel 7. At the start of May the station moved to broadcasting a 24-hour 'Norwich News Wire' when programmes were not on air. The station also started streaming some of its live studio programming on its YouTube channel 'Norfolk Now'.

=== 2017 ===
Mustard TV closed at the end of August 2017, having been sold to the That's TV group. This would later become the TV channel That's Norfolk.

== Programming ==
Mustard TV broadcast a wide range of local programming including news, current affairs, entertainment, culture, sports, property and cookery.

The station broadcast 90 minutes of local news from Mustard TV's Norwich studio every weekday evening. These shows included:

- Mustard News - airing every hour on a weekday evening; the station promised to devote roughly five times as much airtime to Norwich than the existing coverage provided by BBC Look East and ITV Anglia
- The Mustard Show - a nightly magazine show on local life, comedy, drama, game shows, culture, arts and human interest stories was one of its flagship programmes, airing at 6:30pm on Monday, Tuesday, Thursday and Friday evenings. Presenters included NCFC football player Darren Eadie, former ITV Anglia presenter Helen McDermott, BBC Radio Norfolk breakfast presenter Nick Conrad and Future Radio presenter Beth Davison.
- This Week - A panel of local guests answered questions on local issues. This aired in the 6.30pm slot usually occupied by The Mustard Show.
- The Pink Un Show - During the football season The Pink Un Show aired on a Wednesday evening for Norwich City fans. The show was usually fronted by The Pink Un reporter Michael Bailey, and featured a panel of guests talking about the club's performance.
- Walks Around Britain - the syndicated series featuring walks from across the country all between 2 – 8 miles.
- Beth's Book Club - a book panel discussion programme, presented by Beth Davison. The programme featured writing talents: Ian Rankin, Lee Childs, Ruby Wax, Ellie Griffiths, Peter May and others.
