= Cornwall Life =

Cornwall Life is a monthly magazine, produced by Archant Life for Cornwall, United Kingdom. It has around 65,000 readership and is edited by journalist Elizabeth Kirby.

Archant Life publish more than 30 Life County magazines in the UK. The publication is based in Truro, Cornwall. In April 2015 the magazine started its national edition. As of March 2017, Cornwall Life's website share information on visiting Cornwall, such as things to do, good food and drink, and casual living in Cornwall.
