= James Desborough =

James Desborough may refer to:

- James Desborough (journalist)
- James Desborough (game designer)
