= Brentford, Chiswick and Isleworth Times =

Former UK newspapers

Formerly and historically titled The Brentford & Chiswick Times, The Brentford, Chiswick & Isleworth Times was a weekly local newspaper covering news and events across mainly The Brentford and Chiswick areas and the Eastern part of The London Borough of Hounslow in London, United Kingdom.

The paper closed in 2015.

== Publication ==
It was published in tabloid format every Friday and was owned by Newsquest Media Group, and along with the other newspapers in the local group had an average circulation of 15,675 in 2005.

The paper became based at offices in Twickenham, London, where the Richmond and Twickenham Times is also produced.

== Other titles in the same local group ==
- Richmond and Twickenham Times

== See also ==
- List of newspapers in London
