= Ipswich Star =

Local newspaper based in Ipswich, England

- Type: Daily newspaper
- Owner: USA Today Co.
- Publisher: Newsquest
- Editor: Liz Nice
- Founded: 17 February 1885
- Relaunched: The Star of the East (1885–1893) The Evening Star (1893–2012) Ipswich Star (2012–)
- Language: English
- Circulation: 2,364 (as of 2024)
- Sister newspapers: Felixstowe Star; East Anglian Daily Times
- Website: ipswichstar.co.uk

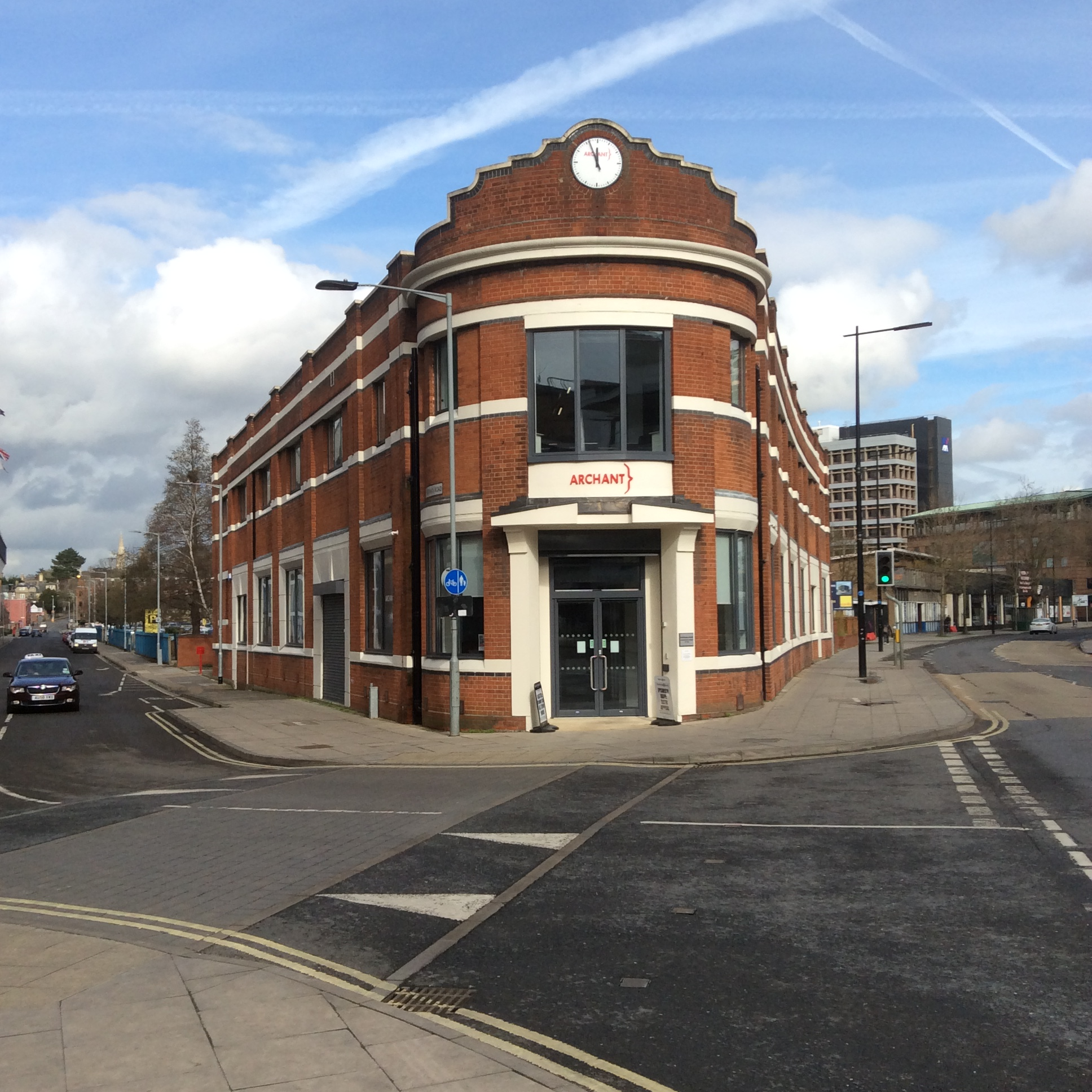
The 'Archant' office in Princes Street,

The Ipswich Star (formerly Evening Star) is a daily evening local newspaper based in Ipswich, UK published by Newsquest. The newspaper started publication on 17 February 1885 and is published Monday to Friday.

== History ==
The newspaper was known as The Star of the East from 1885 until 1893 when it became The Evening Star. On 23 January 2012 The Evening Star was rebranded as the Ipswich Star, for sale in Ipswich, and the Felixstowe Star for sale in Felixstowe. Both editions are published Monday to Friday only, with a Saturday edition no longer viable.

The newspaper has long been published by the same company as the East Anglian Daily Times. The news operations were merged in 2010.

In the period December 2010 to June 2011, average daily circulation was 15,351. This had dropped to an average daily circulation of 8,620 (of which 2,836 are free copies) for the period ended July to December 2017. The free Ipswich Advertiser was separated from the newspaper and sales declined further to 6,000 for the period January to June 2018 (actual paid for sales are now down to around 3,000).

== Green 'Un ==
From 1923 until 2008 the Star had a Saturday football edition, originally called the Football Star and then the Green 'Un. The Green 'Un is no longer printed but exists as a website, focused on non-league football.
