= Helen McDermott =

British radio and television presenter (born 1954)

Helen McDermott (born 24 March 1954) is a British radio and television presenter, best known for her work at Anglia Television.

McDermott began her broadcasting career in the 1970s as a continuity announcer and newsreader for Westward Television in Plymouth. While at Westward, she made an attempt at a singing career under the pseudonym of 'Helen Barnes'.

In 1979, the year of the ITV strike, McDermott joined Anglia Television as an announcer and newsreader, where she quickly became one of the station's most popular faces. In 1980, while working as part of the announcing staff, McDermott devised the idea of utilising a puppet during the regular children's birthdays' slots, based upon her previous work at Westward alongside station mascot Gus Honeybun. The puppet BC (or Birthday Club) went on to become a fixture on Anglia for 22 years. BC was retired in July 2002, with a spokesman for Anglia paying tribute when the news was announced in June of that year: 'BC has had a marvellous run on Anglia for 22 years, and we appreciate that many viewers will be sorry to see him go. But nothing is forever in television.'

McDermott left Anglia's presentation department when in-vision continuity was phased out at the station in the late 1980s. She later became one of the chief anchors for the East sub-regional edition of Anglia News between 1990 and 2001, and continued to work on a range of other regional programmes.

She was also a presenter at 99.9 Radio Norwich, but left in 2010 following budget cuts by station owners Tindle Radio. In January 2011, McDermott joined BBC Radio Norfolk in Norwich as presenter of the 11 am to 1 pm slot from Monday to Thursday. In January 2012 her programme was dropped from the Radio Norfolk schedule.

McDermott has run OhYesItIz Productions with Desmond Barrit since 2004, producing the annual pantomime at the Pavilion Theatre in Gorleston. In 2012 she appeared in Mother Goose alongside her former Anglia television colleague Paul Lavers.

In 2014 McDermott began appearing as a reporter on Norwich television station Mustard TV. Within weeks she was asked to co-present the channel's flagship nightly entertainment programme, The Mustard Show.
