= The Pink Un =

Website covering Norwich City Football Club

- Type: Sports news website; former weekly Saturday‑evening sports newspaper
- Format: Tabloid (print, until 2009)
- Publisher: Norwich Evening News
- Editor: Paddy Davitt, Norwich City editor
- Language: English
- Headquarters: Prospect House, Rouen Road, Norwich, Norfolk, England

The Pink Un was a weekly, paid-for newspaper, and now website, focusing on Norwich City football club and also non-league football in Norfolk, England. The paper was published every Saturday evening in Norwich during the football season. Published by Archant, the newspaper was closely linked to its sister publication, the Norwich Evening News.

Although the paper edition is no longer published, the website survives.

== Origin of name ==
The name of the publication derives from the tradition of many city-based evening newspapers in Britain producing a special weekly edition with football news, published each weekend. They were printed by their mainstream newspaper on pink paper, hence the name. Some were included with Friday or Saturday editions, and some were sold separately. Some had the formal name of their newspaper, although they would be known locally as "the Pink 'Un", while others had the formal masthead name of "Pink 'Un". Their production tended to cease from the 1960s onwards as mainstream evening newspapers also declined.

Somerset Maugham also mentioned the Pink 'Un in his novel Cakes and Ale Chapter IX, Arthur Conan Doyle in Sherlock Holmes adventure The Blue Carbuncle and George Orwell in his novel Burmese Days, chapter 5.
