= Photography Monthly =

Monthly UK magazine

- Frequency: Monthly
- Founded: 2001
- First issue: 2001 (25 years ago)
- Final issue: 2014 (12 years ago)
- Company: Archant
- Country: United Kingdom
- Based in: Essex
- Language: English

Photography Monthly was a monthly magazine published in the United Kingdom by Archant.

== Overview ==
Photography Monthly was established in 2001 and closed in 2014. The magazine focused on photography and contained articles on cameras, techniques, locations, digital imaging and lighting. It also included reviews, galleries and tutorials. Its headquarters were in Essex.

== Website ==
The magazine was also on the Internet with a website that was designed as a community site, offering users the ability to upload their images to the site's galleries, rate, and leave comments on pictures uploaded by other users. The site also featured a community based forum, a camera finder search option, news, reviews, tips and techniques, a locations guide, a business directory and competitions.

The magazine was available in both print and as a digital magazine.
