= Barking & Dagenham Post =

- Cover of Barking & Dagenham Post on 28 October 2015
- Type: Weekly newspaper
- Format: Tabloid
- Owner: USA Today Co.
- Publisher: Newsquest
- Circulation: 824 (as of 2023)
- Website: barkinganddagenhampost.co.uk

The Barking & Dagenham Post is a weekly local newspaper in the area of the London Borough of Barking & Dagenham. It is published by Newsquest.

The paper was originally called the Dagenham Post, and some older residents of its distribution area still refer to it by this name. It is published on Wednesdays and As of August 2021 the cover price for the paper edition is 85p.

An online digital edition is available free on the website from the day after paper publication.

Journalists who formerly worked on the paper include the News of the World's James Desborough and the Daily Mirror's Tom Bryant
