= Newham Recorder =

Newspaper in United Kingdom

- Type: Weekly newspaper
- Format: Tabloid
- Owner: USA Today Co.
- Publisher: Newsquest
- Editor: Simon Murfitt
- Founded: 1968
- Political alignment: None
- Language: English
- Headquarters: Maritime House, 7th Floor, Linton Gardens, Barking
- Circulation: 7,729 (as of 2023)
- ISSN: 0961-3374
- OCLC number: 1001699885
- Website: newhamrecorder.co.uk

The Newham Recorder is a local weekly newspaper distributed in the London Borough of Newham. It is published weekly, on a Wednesday, in the tabloid format by Newsquest Media Group Limited, the UK's second largest independently owned regional media business, with a digital edition updated throughout the day.

== History ==
The newspaper was founded in 1968, three years after the county boroughs of West Ham and East Ham - both of which had previously been part of Essex - were combined to form the new London Borough of Newham. Prior to that, since the early 1900s the area had been served by the East Ham Recorder, a slip edition of the Ilford Recorder.

The Recorder won the title of National Campaigning Newspaper of the year in 1995.

The Newham Recorder's Susan Smith won Feature Writer of the Year at the Eastern Counties Newspaper Group awards in 2007. The Newham title also won the Q Cup, awarded by Archant to its Community Newspaper of the Year in 2009.

Archant withdrew the Newham Recorder, along with several other newspapers in its stable, from the ABC circulation figures in 2010 because it felt they didn't properly reflect its size in view of the variety of distribution channels used, with only part being paid for.

The newspaper received praise from the police for its coverage of the rioting and criminal disorder of August 2011.

== Editorial history ==
The newspaper's first editor, Tom Duncan, was made a freeman of Newham in recognition of his work in the community. The second, from 1997, was Colin Grainger who joined as a trainee reporter upon leaving a local school in 1972. Grainger left in November 2012 after Archant merged the Recorder's news team with that of the Docklands & East London Advertiser. Both weeklies were then controlled by one single editor, Archant's East London Group Editor Malcolm Starbrook. The two papers were "un-merged" in 2014 and the Newham Recorder acquired a new editor, Michael Adkins. In 2017 Lorraine King became the paper's new editor after Adkins was promoted to Archant's Group Editor for London. King left in 2019, initially to work on a freelance basis.

After Lindsay Jones left in March 2021, Franki Berry was appointed that month, being promoted from chief reporter for the group's North London publications. In November 2022, Berry left her role as editor of Newsquest's East London weeklies, intending to travel.. She was succeeded by Simon Murfitt.

== Ownership ==
In 2020, the Archant group, which had owned the newspaper since its founding in 1968, was acquired by private equity firm RCapital.. In March 2022, Archant Community Media Limited was bought by Newsquest Media Group Limited, having been put up for sale by Rcapital. The Newham Recorder would therefore overlap with Newsquest's East London and West Essex Guardian series. Newsquest is owned by the American mass media holding company USA Today Co.
