= Great Yarmouth Mercury =

- Type: Weekly newspaper
- Owner: USA Today Co.
- Publisher: Newsquest
- Founded: 1880
- Circulation: 5,100 (as of 2023)
- Website: greatyarmouthmercury.co.uk

The Great Yarmouth Mercury is a weekly newspaper serving the Great Yarmouth area of Norfolk, England. The paper was established in 1880. It is published by Newsquest.
