= World Entertainment News Network =

Entertainment news wire service based in London, England

- Type: News, online, wire service
- Founded: London, United Kingdom (1989)
- Headquarters: United Kingdom
- Owner: private, Beiny Family
- Website: wenn.com

World Entertainment News Network (commonly known as WENN) is an entertainment text, photo and video wire service headquartered in London with offices in Los Angeles, New York, Las Vegas and Berlin.

WENN's subscribers include newspapers, magazines, radio stations, television networks, mobile phone company and websites. It also owns the Cover Images picture agency.

== History ==
WENN was launched as an entertainment news wire service in London in 1989 by UK newspaper journalist and ABC Radio News correspondent Jonathan Ashby. It began as the World Rock News Network (WRNN) and the company soon established a niche for itself, including; contributors ABC News correspondents Dave Alpert in New York and Gayl Murphy in Los Angeles, providing breaking music news to subscribers including MTV, BBC, ABC and Russia's daily youth newspaper, Komsomolskaya Pravda. In 1991 the company name was changed to the World Entertainment News Network (WENN) to reflect its focus on celebrity news and photos. Its picture desk opened in 1993, and a Los Angeles bureau was added in 1994.

A year later, WENN opened a TV operation and spent 18 months interviewing international celebrities for global clients throughout Europe and in Japan and South Africa. Satellite offices followed in Eastern Europe, Japan, Australia and South America.

In 2000, WENN sales director Lloyd Beiny became CEO after Ashby retired. Under Beiny's, WENN opened bureaus hubs in New York City and Berlin, Germany.

In 2016, WENN founded a second photo agency, Cover Images, focusing on news, sport and other areas of photography in complement to WENN's library of entertainment images.

== Former employees ==
Amy Winehouse and DJ Yoda reported on celebrities in the early 2000s. Other former employees include Matthew Wright and James Desborough.
