= North Norfolk News =

Weekly newspaper in Norfolk, England

- Type: Weekly newspaper
- Format: Tabloid
- Owner(s): Archant
- Circulation: 2,097 (as of 2023)
- Website: northnorfolknews.co.uk

The North Norfolk News is a weekly newspaper serving part of Norfolk, England. Towns and villages it covers include Cromer, Sheringham, North Walsham, Aylsham, Holt, Stalham, Wells-next-the-Sea, Reepham, Hoveton and Wroxham. It is published by the Archant group on Thursdays, and its website is updated several times every day.

The North Norfolk News was established in 1940. Its staff members work remotely around north Norfolk, as well as at the Archant head office in Norwich, following the closure of the firm's Cromer office in 2019. It was shortlisted for best paid-for UK weekly newspaper for 2013.

== Contents ==
Its content includes a mix of news, features, a guide to upcoming events and sport. Many of the stories it runs are also published in its sister daily newspaper, the Eastern Daily Press.

Some elements have disappeared or been replaced by others over the years. In the 1960s the paper ran a ‘Thass a Larf’ column, which no longer exists.

From 2017 to 2020 the paper ran a weekly Enjoy Cromer More page focusing on positive news from that town.

Although the feature has not run in the print edition since the onset of the coronavirus pandemic, Enjoy Cromer More continues to exist as a separate website and on social media channels.

Other areas of coverage have stayed more or less the same for decades. Upcoming things to do, investment in car parks and refurbishments of town pubs were all covered as topics of local interest 40 years ago, just as they are today.

Some areas of coverage can be considered particular to the coastal nature of the region, including summer carnivals at busy seaside towns, such as Cromer Carnival, and devastating storm surges.

== Audience ==
An average 3,656 paid copies were sold weekly in 2019, and the newspaper has an average print readership of 15,468. The audited weekly sales figure for January to June 2012 was 6,619.

Its website is said to have 142,652 monthly users. According to ABC figures the newspaper had the highest online growth for any UK newspaper in February 2019, when it recorded a 72% increase in the number of daily unique average browsers to visit its site compared to year-end figures for 2017 and 2018.
