= James Desborough (journalist) =

Show business writer, media commentator and PR consultant

James Desborough is a show business writer, media commentator and PR consultant who works in Los Angeles, New York and London.

James has been a long-term media commentator and contributor to news outlets worldwide. He regularly appears on BBC Radio shows broadcast worldwide.

As a correspondent he has interviewed celebrities from the worlds of sports, politics and entertainment. James has appeared on major TV networks, print publications and online websites worldwide.

Desborough has been a correspondent for outlets worldwide including being a freelance contributor for Daily Mail TV covering high profile red carpet events and conducting exclusive interviews. His exclusive material featured in the season of Daily Mail TV, hosted by Jesse Palmer, which won the Daytime Emmy Award for Outstanding Entertainment News Program at the 46th Annual Daytime Emmy Awards in Pasadena, California on Sunday.

He was named the Show business Reporter Of The Year at the 2009 British Press Awards. In 2014 he won two awards at the Southern California Journalism Awards - Online Personality Profile Article and Online Entertainment Feature. He also collected the runner up prize for the Online Entertainment News Category. In 2013, he was nominated as Entertainment Journalist Of The Year at the 55th So Cal Journalism Awards and was runner-up in the international news report category at the 55th SoCal Journalism Awards.

Desborough, being English, is not related to a Cornish serial killer of the same name. Some social media commentators and outlets have confused the two men because of the criminal's obsession with the TV crime series Dexter.

== Early career ==
Desborough started work at the regional newspaper the Barking & Dagenham Post as a news reporter in 1994. The newspaper's past reporters include editor Phil Hall, who later became the editor of News of the World.

Desborough worked as a freelancer diary reporter on the London showbiz and social scene from 1999 to 2000. In 2000, Desborough was hired by World Entertainment News Network (WENN) as the News Editor in London by CEO Jonathan Ashby. During that time he worked alongside former Sun reporter and author Bill Coles.

Desborough was hired by The People newspaper in summer of 2001 replacing their existing show business reporter Sean Hoare, who left to join The News Of The World. In the final weeks at WENN, allegations published by Salon.com claimed that he and his team fabricated a quote by Sir George Martin relating to the health of George Harrison. WENN sold the story to The Mail On Sunday claiming that Martin said Harrison was close to death. The interview was conducted by WENN reporter Christian Koch, but the story appeared under the byline of Katie Nicholl in The Mail On Sunday on 22 July with the headline: "George Harrison Is Close to Death Says '5th Beatle' Martin". Afterwards Martin denied giving the quotes, but in the next few months many more media outlets reported Harrison's condition was worsening. It was afterwards revealed that Harrison and wife Olivia had tried to keep details of the illness a secret. Later Olivia admitted, in a book and Martin Scorsese documentary about George Harrison's life – both titled George Harrison: Living in the Material World – that her husband had spent the summer months of 2001 preparing for his death. He spent time at a hospice and his last summer in Fuji. Time magazine revealed how: "Harrison eventually surrendered to throat and lung cancer. He and Olivia spent a last lovely summer in Fiji, preparing for the end and taking stock of their life together." Harrison died four months after the Mail On Sunday article on 29 November 2001.

== Publications ==
=== Sunday People ===
In 2001, Desborough joined the Sunday People as a show business reporter. He left in 2005.

In 2004, Desborough was promoted to the role of TV Editor. He covered a series of reality shows, primetime series and soaps for the newspaper including Big Brother, Wife Swap, I'm a Celebrity...Get Me Out of Here!, Pop Idol and Celebrity Love Island.

=== News Of The World ===
Desborough interviewed Mills' former manager Michele Elyzabeth, who delivered a two-week exposé on Mills' conduct toward McCartney and her secret ploys to tarnish the rock star's reputation with the public. Elyzabeth told Desborough that Mills was "a lying witch", who misled the public over McCartney's financial donations to her and daughter Bea during their separation.

Desborough did an interview with Amy Winehouse's former boyfriend, Alex Haines, in 2008, detailing her addictions to crack and marijuana. Haines admitted that Winehouse planned to join "The 27 Club" – the list of famous musicians who died at the age of 27. Winehouse died at the age of 27 in July 2011.

In March 2009, Desborough was awarded The Showbiz Reporter of The Year Award at the British Press Awards. He was presented the award by Channel 4 news presenter Jon Snow at the ceremony held at The Grosvenor House Hotel in London.

== U.S. move ==
After his award, News Of The World editor, Colin Myler promoted Desborough to the role of U.S. Editor.

In July 2009, Desborough interviewed Jackson's sister La Toya Jackson, who told him "Michael Jackson was murdered". Desborough appeared on CBS shows and TV networks around the world discussing the interview.

Desborough generated more headlines for the News Of The World when Michael's father Joe Jackson blamed his wife Katherine for the death of their son. Other exclusives included the first picture of the bedroom and chaotic scene where Jackson died, reports from the paramedics that Jackson was dead before they arrived and hospital emergency room doctors confirming Murray withheld details of Jackson's Propofol intake when they treated him. Desborough revealed how Jackson's mental and physical state was poor in his last weeks alive. He revealed he needed a golf cart to get him on stage and even used a double for rehearsals.

=== Operation Weeting ===
In 2011, he was asked to assist with enquiries by UK officers from Operation Weeting, who were investigating editorial and management staff over suspicions of phone hacking. Later that day, an officer Peter Cripps from Operation Weeting was arrested at his desk over suspicions of leaks to The Guardian.

On that same day, Deputy Assistant Commissioner Sue Akers, head of the Operation Weeting, inquiry into phone hacking at the News Of The World, said: "I made very clear the need for operational and information security. It is hugely disappointing that this may not have been adhered to." The Guardian, when asked if payments were made to police, said in a statement: "In common with all news organizations we have no comment to make on the sources of our journalism.”

On 19 August 2011, Desborough's criminal solicitor issued a statement about the matter. Mr. Young issued a comment on behalf of his client: "He attended a South London police station voluntarily and by appointment with his Solicitor, Julian Young. He was interviewed for a number of hours and cooperated fully with the police in their investigations. He denied, and continues to deny, any conspiracy to unlawfully intercept voice mails or acting unlawfully in any way."

On 27 March 2012, the Metropolitan Police and Operation Weeting confirmed that "no further action" would be taken against Desborough. Desborough was the first staff employee of the News Of The World to be cleared after an investigation by the Weeting team.

His arrest record was expunged.

In March 2012 Alison Levitt QC, the principal legal advisor to the Director of Public Prosecutions, said there was "sufficient evidence" to show that 10 articles written by Guardian journalist Amelia Hill between 4 April 2011 and 18 August 2011 contained confidential information from Operation Weeting, including the names of those who had been arrested. There was also sufficient evidence to establish the police officer in question had disclosed the information to Hill. Neither Hill nor Cripps were charged for their involvement.

== Hollywood correspondent/consultant ==
He was his nominated as the Entertainment Reporter Of The Year at the So Cal Journalism Awards. Desborough was named the runner up at the same Awards in 2013 for an exclusive article in the Sunday Express on Oscar winner Adele's move to abandon her world tour plans.

In July 2014 he won two awards at the Southern California Journalism Awards - Online Personality Profile Article and Online Entertainment Feature and collected the runner up prize for the Online Entertainment News Category.
