= Norwich Evening News =

Daily local newspaper published in Norwich, England

- Type: Daily newspaper
- Owner: USA Today Co.
- Publisher: Newsquest
- Editor: Richard Porritt
- Language: English
- Headquarters: Norwich
- Circulation: 2,587 (as of 2024)
- Website: eveningnews24.co.uk

The Norwich Evening News is a daily local newspaper published in Norwich, Norfolk, England. It covers the city and the surrounding suburbs, and is published by Newsquest.

The Norwich Evening News is a sister paper to the Eastern Daily Press.

On 1 July 2021, it was announced that Richard Porritt would be the paper's new editor after leaving his previous role as Politics and Business Editor at the Eastern Daily Press.

== History ==
Norwich Evening News launched in 1882 as Eastern Evening News.

== See also ==
- Eastern Daily Press, Archant publication covering East Anglia
