= Maribou State =

English electronic music duo

- Origin: Hertfordshire, England
- Genres: Electronica
- Years active: 2011—present
- Label: Counter Records
- Members: Chris Davids; Liam Ivory
- Website: mariboustate.co.uk

Maribou State are an English electronic music duo consisting of Chris Davids and Liam Ivory. To date, they have released eight EPs and three studio albums, Portraits (2015), Kingdoms in Colour (2018), and Hallucinating Love (2025). Besides their own material, the two producers have also done remixes for the likes of Alpines and Lana Del Rey. The duo perform internationally and are signed to Counter Records, an imprint of UK independent label Ninja Tune.

== History ==
Originally from Berkhamsted, Hertfordshire, in southern England, Davids and Ivory met at school, where they first developed an interest in music. After writing music and being in local bands for a number of years, they were offered the opportunity to create a remix for the band Hadouken! at the age of 16. They made their debut as Maribou State in 2011 with the five-track EP Habitat on FatCat Records. They released several EPs and singles on Norman Cook's Southern Fried Records in 2012 and 2013, and did a number of remixes for Fatboy Slim, Lana Del Rey, Ultraísta, Kelis, and others. Their 2013 EP Truths featured vocals by Jimi Nxir, Holly Walker, and Nubiya Brandon.

While the duo were preparing their first full-length album, their former record-company FatCat Records released the compilation Beginnings, which contained eight tracks and seven remixes by other artists. In June 2015, Maribou State released their debut album Portraits, under the Ninja Tune imprint Counter Records, preceded by the single "The Clown" featuring North Downs (Pedestrian). The song "Midas", featuring Holly Walker, was certified Platinum by the BPI in 2026.

In 2018, the band returned with Kingdoms in Colour, which included the track "Feel Good" featuring Khruangbin; vocals from long-standing collaborators Holly Walker, (who previously sang on "Midas", "Steal", and "Tongue"); a collaboration with North Downs (Pedestrian); and the standout single "Turnmills" (named after the London club which closed in 2008).

The record earned them a #25 spot on the UK album charts (and #4 on the UK Record Store chart), was BBC 6 Music's 'Album of the Day', and received huge support from Annie Mac, Nick Grimshaw, Gilles Peterson, Tom Ravenscroft, Lauren Laverne, Steve Lamacq, Pete Tong, Nemone, and many more, with the band also performing live on Lauren Laverne’s show. Press support came from the likes of NME, Complex, GQ, and Crack Magazine, with Mixmag naming them as one of their 'Artists of the Year' in 2018.

In 2019, Maribou State completed a sold-out UK & EU tour, which included a show at London’s O2 Brixton Academy, with the 5-piece band joined on stage by a string quartet and choir. They have also played to sold-out crowds in cities across Europe and North America, with shows in Manchester, Bristol, Cologne, Berlin, Prague, Warsaw, Hamburg, Copenhagen, Amsterdam, Zurich, and Brussels. They also played a run of sold-out North American shows in New York, Los Angeles, San Francisco, Toronto, Montreal, Vancouver, Seattle, and Portland. The group will play the Snowbombing festival in Austria in April 2022, the Junction 2 Festival in London in June, and the SWF (Straf Werk) Festival in Amsterdam in August. They will also perform a DJ set at the Paradise City Festival in Belgium in July 2022.

In 2024, Maribou State announced their upcoming new album, Hallucinating Love, which was released on 31 January 2025. To promote it, the band teamed up with the Pressure Drop craft brewery, who created the Hallucinating Love Pale Ale.

== Discography ==
=== Studio albums ===
- Portraits (2015)
- Kingdoms in Colour (2018)
- Hallucinating Love (2025)

=== EPs ===
- Habitat (2011)
- Got Me Down (Remixes) (2011)
- Olivia (2012)
- Olivia (Remixes) (2012)
- Scarlett Groove (2012)
- Collections (2013)
- Tongue (2013)
- Truths (2013)

=== Remix albums ===
- Portraits Remixed (2015)
- Kingdoms in Colour Remixed (2019)

=== Compilations ===
- Beginnings (2012)

=== Singles ===
- "Native" (2012)
- "Mask" (2013)
- "Rituals" (2015)
- "The Clown" (2015)
- "Portraits Outtakes" (2016)
- "Turnmills" (2018)
- "Feel Good" featuring Khruangbin (2018)
- "Mother" (2020)
- "Blackoak" (2023)
- "Otherside" featuring Holly Walker (2024)
