= Kent on Sunday =

- Kent on Sunday front page
- Type: Free weekly newspaper
- Format: Tabloid
- Owner: KOS Media
- Editor: Ian Patel
- Founded: 2002
- Ceased publication: November 2017
- Headquarters: Ashford, Kent
- Circulation: 155,101 with a readership of 399,000
- Website: www.kentonsunday.co.uk Or kentnews.co.UK

Kent on Sunday was a regional newspaper covering the county of Kent in the United Kingdom. Starting in 2002, it was published on every Sunday of the year and was available from supermarkets, garages and newsagents. The newspaper was the flagship paper of the KOS Media publishing company. In November 2017, it was announced that it would cease publication at the end of the month.

The main focus of the paper was to provide the county with regional, informative news and a sport service. The paper also covered retail, leisure and lifestyle features, plus jobs, cars and property sections. Initially, it also had other local editions, under the "Your Local" series, which were digital news and sport based titles with the traditional content such as jobs, leisure, cars, and property as well as a comprehensive leisure and lifestyle section.

In June 2009 the Kent on Sunday began to charge 90p per issue in the newsagents, whilst the free copies were directed to business rounds and home delivery. Kent on Sunday also has an e-edition, which is available free online or by subscription. The UKPG website quoted KOS Media's Managing Director Paul Stannard as saying, "As with any media company, if in the next four to five years we see the market decline at the same rate it has in the past six months, then everybody will be looking at their business model".

In June 2010, it was announced that KOS Media would be taken over by the Archant Media Group. Archant were rumoured to have previously funded the KOS Media Group and decided to take up the chance to own the company. In January 2011, as part of a restructuring, KOS Media stopped printing the "Your" titles and instead only published them as an online E-edition. In January 2011 Kent on Sunday was re-branded with a new mast-head.

KOS Media were one of the first local media organisations to have their own iPhone Application, allowing readers to look through the papers via their iPhone or iPad.
