= Richmond and Twickenham Times =

Newspaper in United Kingdom

- Richmond and Twickenham Times front page from 4 October 2013
- Type: Weekly free newspaper
- Format: Tabloid
- Owner: Newsquest Media Group
- Founded: 1873
- Headquarters: Sutton, London, England, UK
- Circulation: 11,141 (as of 2023)
- Website: richmondandtwickenhamtimes.co.uk

The Richmond and Twickenham Times is a weekly local newspaper that was established in 1873 and is published on Fridays. It covers the London Borough of Richmond upon Thames in south-west London and surrounding areas.It is colloquially known among its readers as The Ric and Twic.

== History ==
The Richmond and Twickenham Times was established in 1873 by 26-year-old Edward King who ran the paper for 21 years until he was declared insane in 1894. From 1896 it was owned by the Dimbleby family. Richard Dimbleby was managing editor and editor-in-chief from 1946. After his death in 1965, his son David Dimbleby took over. The paper was sold by the Dimblebys to Newsquest in 2001.

In April 2003 when he retired, Malcolm Richards was the country's longest serving newspaper editor, having filled the role for 27 years.

The Richmond and Twickenham Times went tabloid in January 2008.

The newspaper was based at King Street, Richmond from 1873 to 2007 and in London Road, Twickenham from 2007. It moved from its headquarters in Twickenham to Quadrant House in Sutton in May 2014 to cut costs.

== Other editions ==
The Dimbleby group also created the Thames Valley Times, the Chiswick Times, the Barnes, Mortlake and Sheen Times, the Wandsworth Borough News, the Kingston, Surbiton and New Malden Times, the Hounslow, Feltham and Hanworth Times, the Putney and Wimbledon Times and the Battersea News. The Wandsworth Borough News closed in 2009. The others have ceased publication also, the Hounslow and Brentford Times and the Chiswick Times closing in July 2010.
