= KOS Media =

Multimedia company

- Industry: Media
- Founded: 2002
- Headquarters: Smeeth, Kent, England
- Area served: Kent
- Products: Newspapers, websites, online television
- Owner: Archant

KOS Media was a multimedia company based in the county of Kent in South East England. The company operated local newspapers and internet sites throughout the county.

== History ==
KOS Media's first newspaper, the Kent on Sunday was launched as a free newspaper in 2002 and closed in November 2017. The company was based in Smeeth, near Ashford.

Until May 2009, all KOS Media newspapers were free. In June both Kent on Saturday and Kent on Sunday became paid for in the newsagents, to increase availability, whilst the free copies were diverted to business rounds and home delivery. The mid-week local papers remained free. All titles have a fast-growing online audience as they are available free as a page-turning e-edition, or by subscription online.

KOS Media was purchased by Archant in June 2010, having had had a minority interest in KOS Media since 2005.

== Newspapers ==
=== Free newspapers ===
In the summer of 2007 KOS Media introduced free, local papers for different parts of Kent, with three more added in 2009. These were published on Wednesdays and ceased publication in January 2011.

==== 2007 launches ====
- Kent on Saturday
- yourashford
- yourcanterbury
- yourdover
- yourmaidstone
- yourmedway
- yourshepway
- yourswale
- yourthanet

==== 2009 launches ====
- yourdeal
- yoursandwich
- your Tunbridge Wells

== Magazines ==
KOS Media publishes magazines accompanying its paid for papers, such as the "Kent Weekend" entertainment and leisure guide. It also publishes Isle Magazine (published quarterly for the Isle of Thanet); and BBC Radio Kent County Life for the BBC. This caused a complaint against KOS Media and the BBC by rival group the KM Group.

== Television ==
KOS Media operates the YourKentTV internet television channel. The channel features local news and sport, and videos both sent in by viewers and provided by the company.
