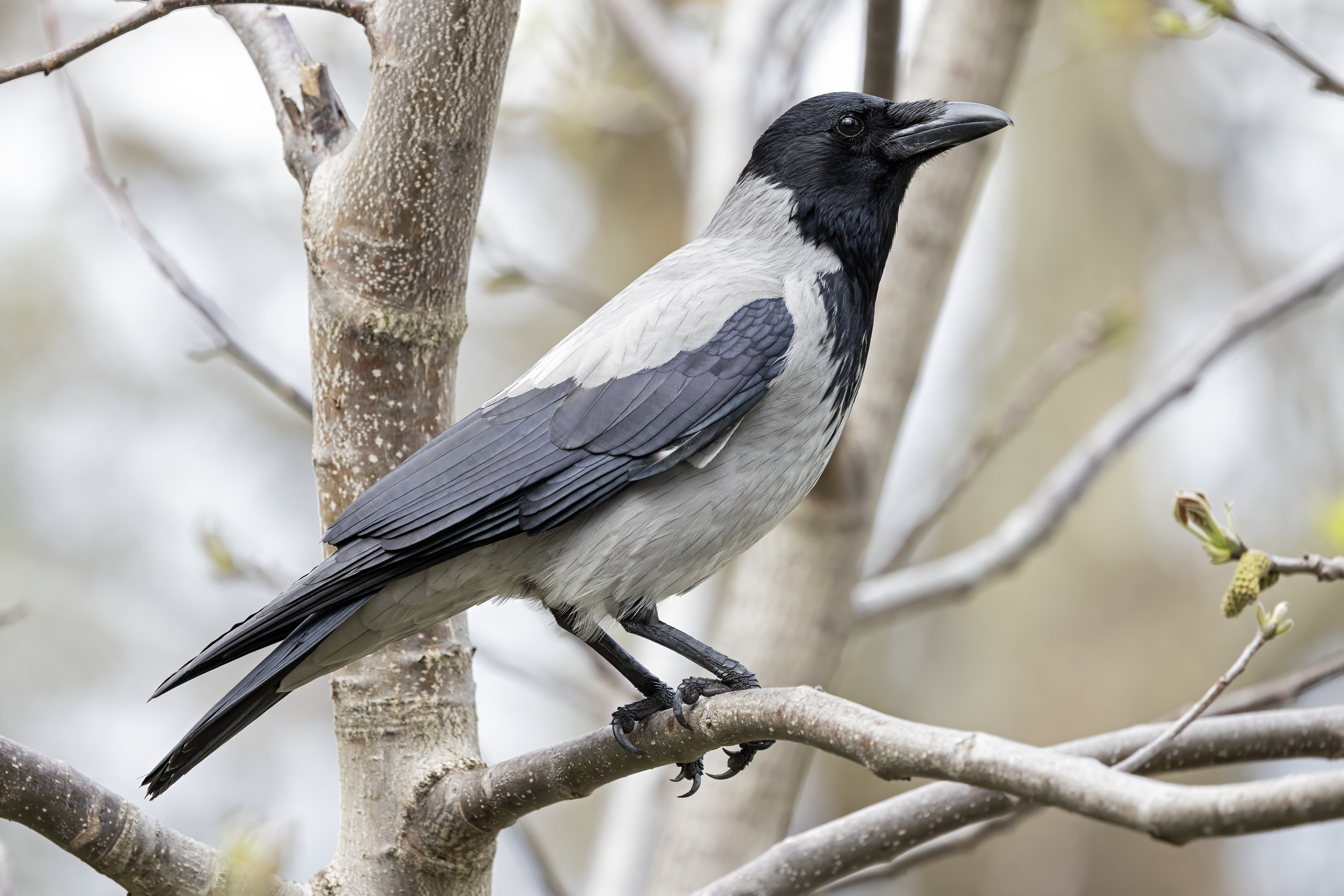
- C. c. sharpi, in North Macedonia

Scientific classification
- Kingdom: Animalia
- Phylum: Chordata
- Class: Aves
- Order: Passeriformes
- Family: Corvidae
- Genus: Corvus
- Species: C. cornix

Binomial name
- Corvus cornix Linnaeus, 1758

Subspecies
- Corvus cornix cornix; Corvus cornix sharpii; Corvus cornix pallescens; Corvus cornix capellanus

Audio
- Hooded crow cawing in Kyiv

= Hooded crow =

Species of bird

The hooded crow (Corvus cornix), also colloquially called just hoodie, is a Eurasian bird subspecies of the carrion crow (Corvus corone) in the genus Corvus. Widely distributed, it is found across Northern, Eastern, and Southeastern Europe, as well as parts of the Middle East. It is an ashy-grey bird with black head, throat, wings, tail, and thigh feathers, as well as a black bill, eyes, and feet. Like other corvids, it is an omnivorous and opportunistic forager and feeder.

In 2002, the hooded crow was separated from the carrion crow and classified as its own species by the British Ornithologists' Union. However, in 2025, the new global AviBase re-classified the hooded and carrion crows as the same species, with the species divided into six subspecies, of which four are 'hooded' grey-and-black, and two are all-black.

== Taxonomy ==
The hooded crow was one of the many species originally described by Carl Linnaeus in his landmark 1758 10th edition of Systema Naturae; he gave it the binomial name Corvus cornix. Linnaeus specified the type locality as "Europa", but this was restricted to Sweden by the German ornithologist Ernst Hartert in 1903. The genus name Corvus is Latin for "raven" while the specific epithet cornix, and the current corone, are Latin for "crow".

=== Etymology ===
The name hooded crow, first known from Scotland in the early 16th century, was established as the standard name by use in Robert Sibbald's Scotia Illustrata in 1684 and Thomas Pennant's British Zoology in 1776, and was formally adopted by the International Ornithologists' Union (IOC) when it was split as a separate species from the carrion crow. It is locally known as a 'hoodie craw' or simply 'hoodie' in Scotland and as a grey crow in Northern Ireland. Its status as a scarce winter visitor from Scandinavia in eastern England has led to a number of historical local names, including "Coatham crow" (from Coatham in North Yorkshire), "Royston crow" (from Royston in Hertfordshire), "Scremerston crow" (from Scremerston in Northumberland), "Danish crow" and "winter crow". In Irish, it is called caróg liath and in Welsh brân lwyd, or the "grey crow", as its name also means in Danish, Swedish, Italian, Spanish, and several Slavic languages. It is referred to as the "pied crow" (bonte kraai) in Dutch and "fog crow" (Nebelkrähe) in German, and the "dolman crow" (dolmányos varjú) in Hungarian.

=== Subspecies ===
Four subspecies of hooded crow were accepted; again now, as previously before 2002, all are considered subspecies of Corvus corone. A fifth subspecies, C. c. sardonius (Kleinschmidt, 1903) has been listed, but has been treated by others either as a synonym of C. c. sharpii, or partitioned between C. c. sharpii (most populations), C. c. cornix (Corsican population), and the Middle Eastern C. c. pallescens.

- C. c. cornix Linnaeus, 1758 – the former nominate subspecies, occurs in Ireland, Scotland, and the rest of northern, eastern, and southeastern Europe south to Corsica.
- C. c. sharpii Oates, 1889 – named after the English zoologist Richard Bowdler Sharpe. This is a paler grey form found from western Siberia through to the Caucasus region and Iran. Some authors also include all the southern European hooded crow populations (including Corsica and all of Italy) in this subspecies.
- C. c. pallescens (Madarász, 1904) – the smallest subspecies, described from Cyprus and also found in southern Turkey through the Levant to Egypt, and, as its name suggests, is paler than C. c. cornix. The birds on Crete may also belong here, though conversely, Egyptian and Levantine birds may be better placed in C. c. sharpii.
- C. c. capellanus Sclater, PL, 1877 – sometimes considered a separate species. This distinctive form occurs in Iraq and southwestern Iran. It has very pale grey plumage, which looks almost white from a distance. It is possibly distinct enough to be considered a separate species.
C. c. cornix, in Ķemeri National Park, Latvia

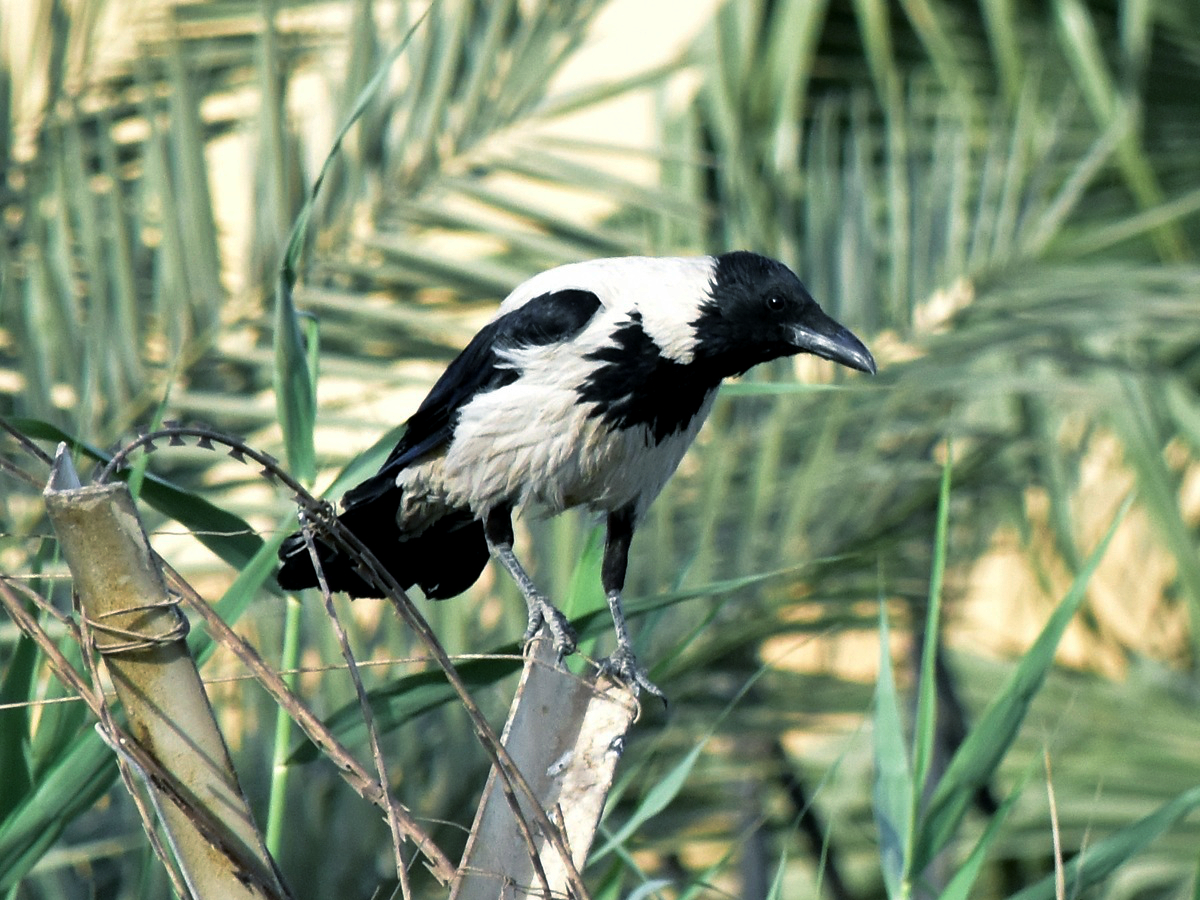
C. c. capellanus, Baghdad, Iraq

C. c. pallescens, Egypt

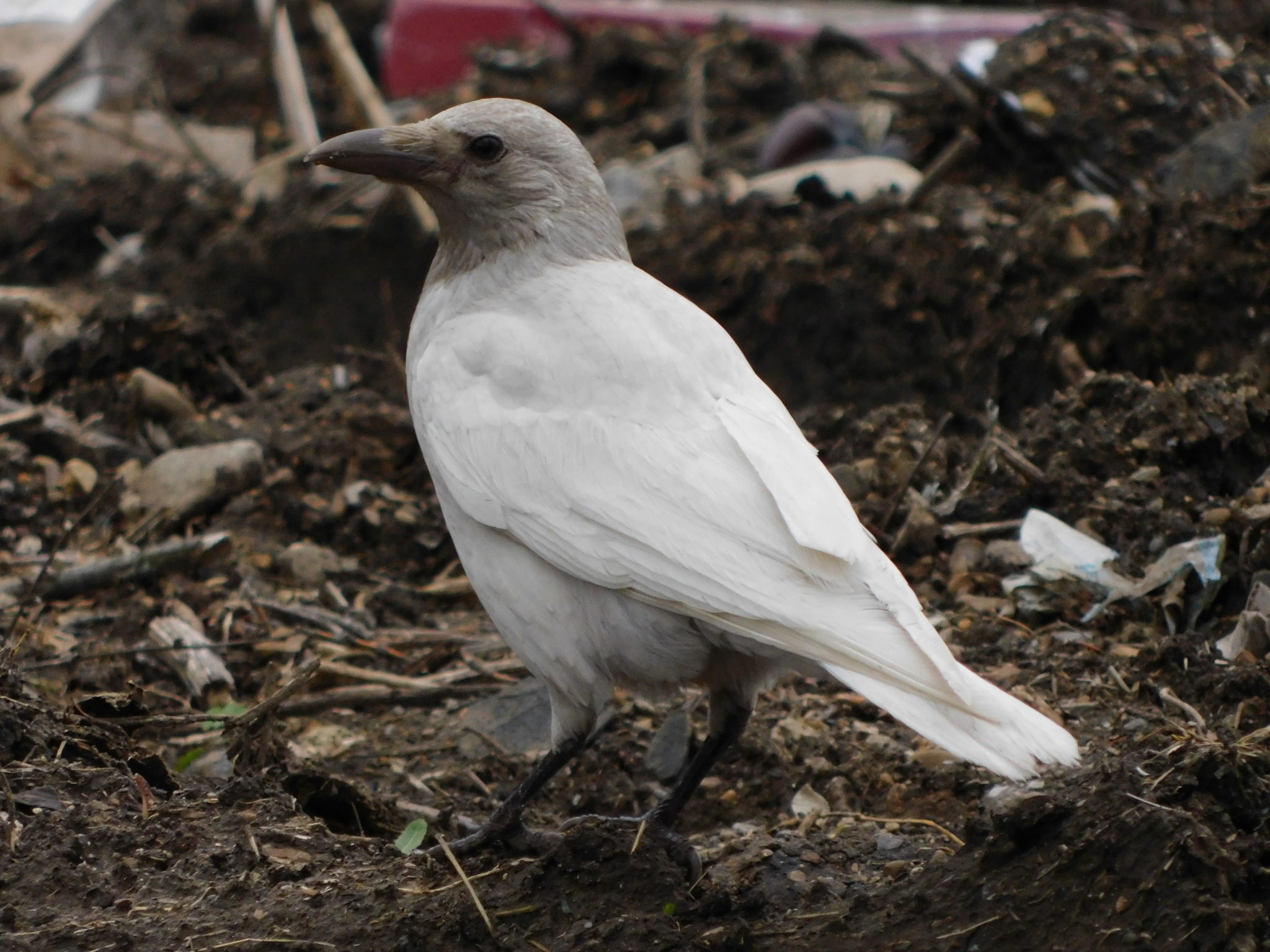
Leucistic, in Russia

=== Genetic difference from carrion crows ===
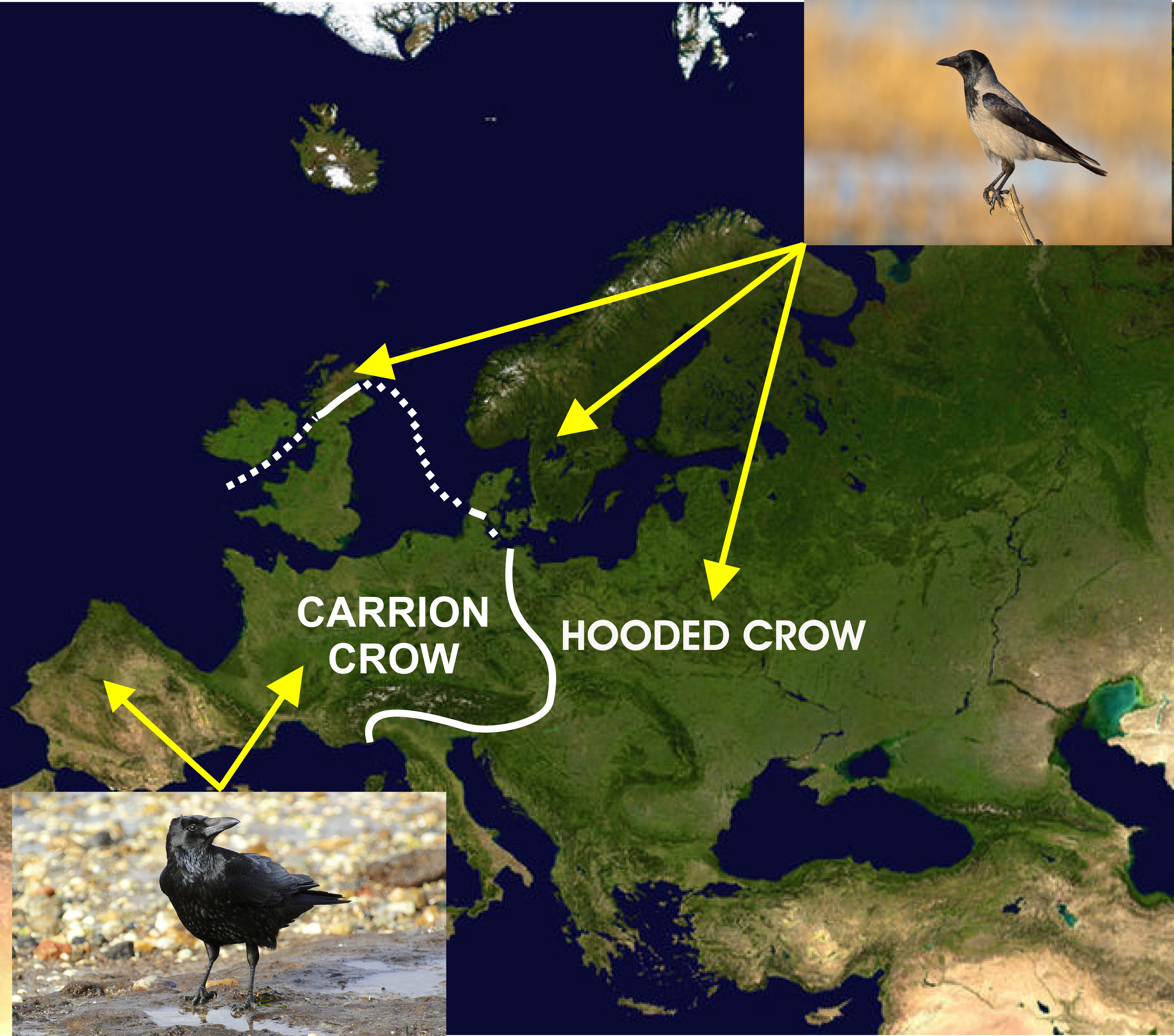
A map of Europe indicating the distribution of the carrion and hooded crows on either side of a contact zone (white line) separating the two species

The hooded crow (Corvus cornix) and carrion crow (Corvus corone) are two closely related species whose geographical distribution across Europe is illustrated in the accompanying diagram. It is believed that this distribution might have resulted from the glaciation cycles during the Pleistocene, which caused the parent population to split into isolates which subsequently re-expanded their ranges when the climate warmed causing secondary contact. Jelmer Poelstra and coworkers sequenced almost the entire genomes of both species in populations at varying distances from the contact zone to find that the two species were nearly genetically identical, both in their DNA and in its expression (in the form of mRNA), except for the lack of expression of a small portion (<0.28%) of the genome (situated on avian chromosome 18) in the hooded crow, which imparts the lighter plumage colouration on its torso. Thus the two species can hybridise viably, and regularly do so at the contact zone, but the all-black carrion crows on the one side of the contact zone mate almost exclusively with other all-black carrion crows, while the same occurs among the hooded crows on the other side of the contact zone. This is an example of assortative mating. They concluded that it was only the outward appearance of the two species that inhibits hybridisation.

== Description ==
C. c. cornix in flight, at Ķemeri National Park, Latvia

Except for the head, throat, wings, tail, and thigh feathers, which are black and mostly glossy, the plumage of the hooded crow is ash-grey, with the dark shafts giving it a streaky appearance. The bill and legs are black; the iris dark brown. Only one moult occurs annually, in autumn, as in other crow species. Male hooded crows tend to be larger than females, although the two sexes are otherwise similar in appearance. Their flight is slow, heavy and usually straight. Their length varies from 48 to 52 cm (19 to 20 in). When first hatched, the young are much blacker than the parents. Juveniles have duller plumage with bluish or greyish eyes, and initially possess a red mouth. The wingspan is 105 cm (41 in) and weight is on average 510 g.

The hooded crow, with its contrasted greys and blacks, is visually distinct from both the carrion crow and the rook, but the kraa call notes of the hooded and carrion crows are almost indistinguishable.

== Distribution ==
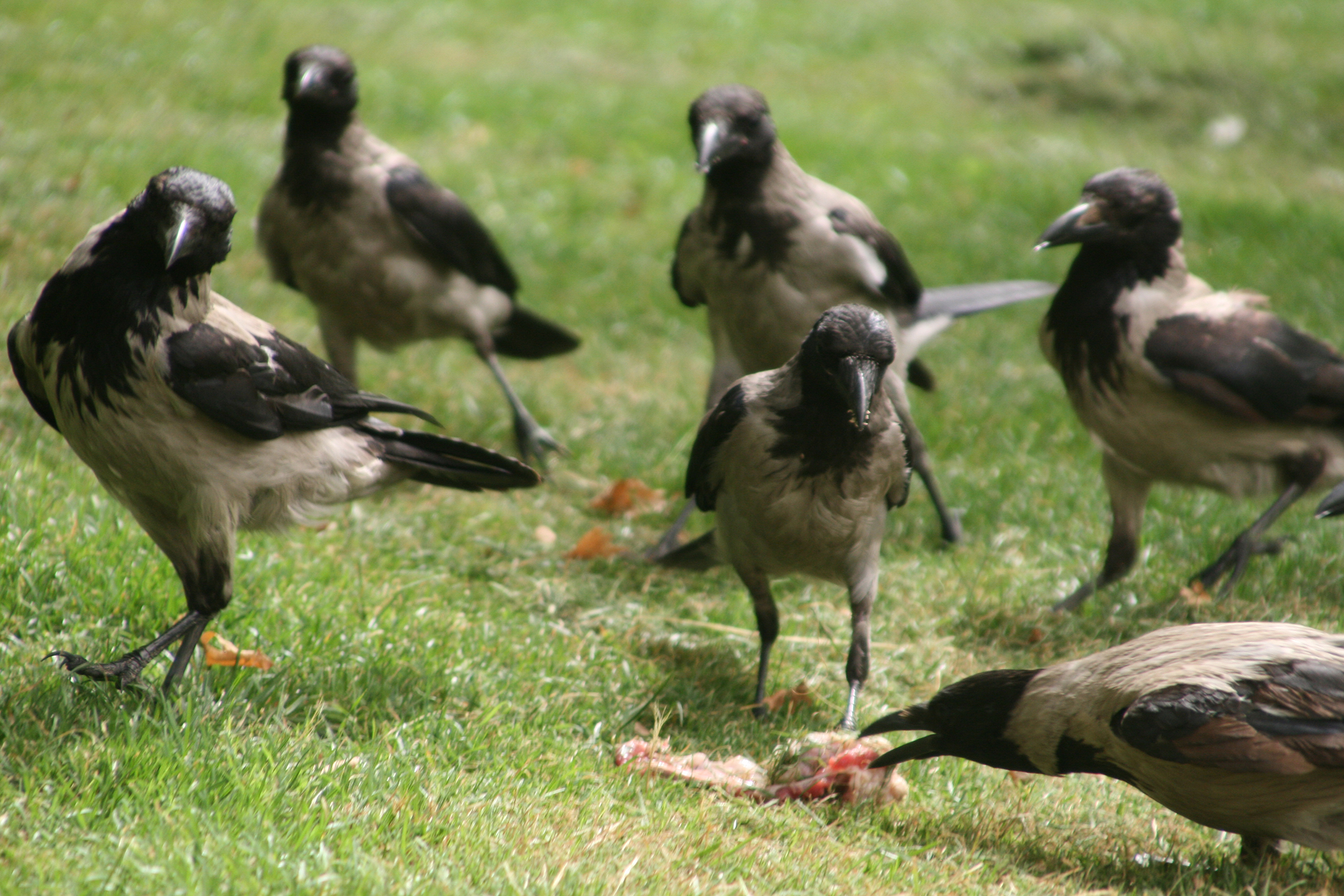
A group of hooded crows in Tehran, Iran

The hooded crow breeds in northern and eastern Europe, and closely allied forms inhabit southern Europe and western Asia. Fertile hybrids are produced where its range meets with that of the carrion crow, as in northern Britain, Germany, Denmark, northern Italy, and Siberia. However, the hybrids are less well-adapted than purebred birds and the hybrid zone remains consistently narrow; this was one of the main reasons behind its reclassification as a distinct species from the carrion crow.

In the British Isles, the hooded crow breeds regularly in northern and western Scotland, the Isle of Man, and the Scottish Islands; it also breeds throughout Ireland. In autumn, some migratory birds arrive on the east coast of Britain. In the past, this was a more common visitor.

In. the near East, Mediterranean, and Central Asia, the bird can be found in Turkey, Greece, Cyprus, Iraq, Iran, Jordan, Egypt, and Israel, and migrates as far as Afghanistan.

== Behaviour ==
=== Diet ===
Hooded crow searching a rain gutter, probably for food, in Berlin

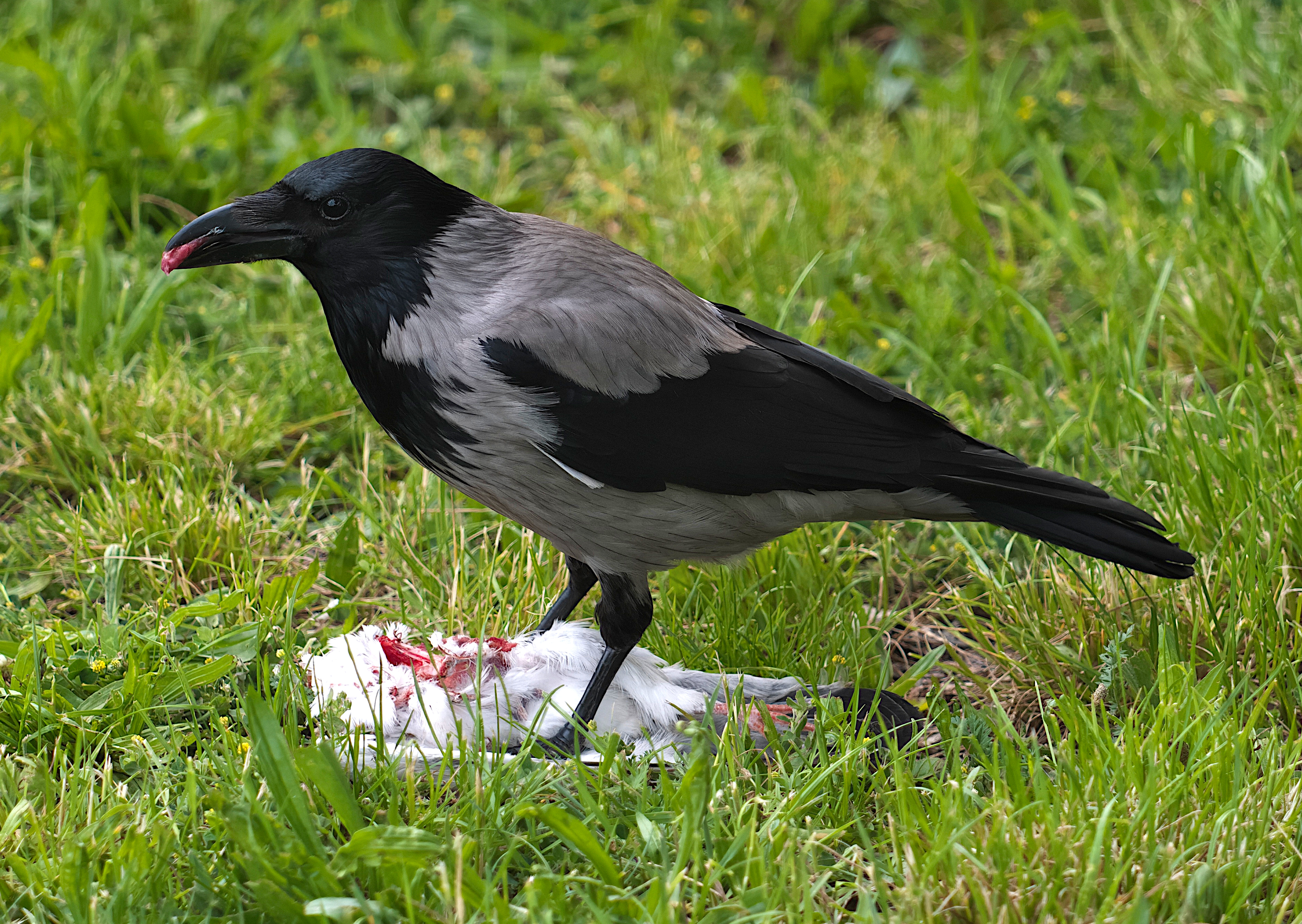
Hooded crow feeding on the flesh of another bird

Hooded crow eating pieces of Bamba snack which were littered in Yarkon Park, Tel Aviv

The hooded crow is omnivorous, with a diet similar to that of the carrion crow, and is a constant scavenger. It drops molluscs and crabs to break them after the manner of the carrion crow, to the point that an old Scottish name for empty sea urchin shells was "crow's cups". On coastal cliffs, the eggs of gulls, cormorants, and other birds are stolen when their owners are absent, and hooded crows will enter the burrows of puffins to steal eggs. It will also feed on small mammals, scraps, smaller birds, and carrion. The hooded crow often hides food to feed on later, especially meat, nuts, and any insects that may be present on these, in places such as rain gutters, flower pots, or in the earth under bushes. Other crows will often watch a crow that hides food and then search the hiding place later when the first crow has left. Like all crows, hooded crows are remarkably intelligent and like parrots, can imitate human language. In addition, they are capable of tool acquisition, such as using sticks to access food stuck in cracks and tiny holes.They have also been shown to be capable of utilizing a pattern in their brains (mental template) in order to put information in order, acknowledge entities and events, and make predictions.

=== Nesting ===
Nesting occurs later in colder regions; mid-May to mid-June in northwest Russia, Shetland, and the Faroe Islands, and late February in the Persian Gulf region. In warmer parts of Europe, the clutch is laid in April. The bulky stick nest is normally placed in a tall tree, but cliff ledges, old buildings, and pylons may be used. Nests are occasionally placed on or near the ground. The nest resembles that of the carrion crow, but on the coast, seaweed is often interwoven in the structure, and animal bones and wire are also frequently incorporated. The four to six brown-speckled blue eggs are 4.3 cm × 3.0 cm (1 3/4 in × 1 1/8 in) in size and weigh 19.8 g (11/16 oz), of which 6% is shell. The altricial young are incubated for 17–19 days by the female alone, that is fed by the male. They fledge after 32 to 36 days. Incubating females have been reported to obtain most of their own food and later that for their young.

The typical lifespan is unknown, but that of the carrion crow is four years. The maximum recorded age for a hooded crow is 16 years, and 9 months.

This species is a secondary host of the parasitic great spotted cuckoo, the European magpie being the preferred host. However, in areas where the latter species is absent, such as Israel and Egypt, the hooded crow becomes the normal corvid host.

This species, like its relative, is regularly killed by farmers and on grouse estates. In County Cork, Ireland, the county's gun clubs shot over 23,000 hooded crows in two years in the early 1980s. Since 1981, they have been protected under the Wildlife and Countryside Act, meaning it is illegal to knowingly kill, injure, or capture them.

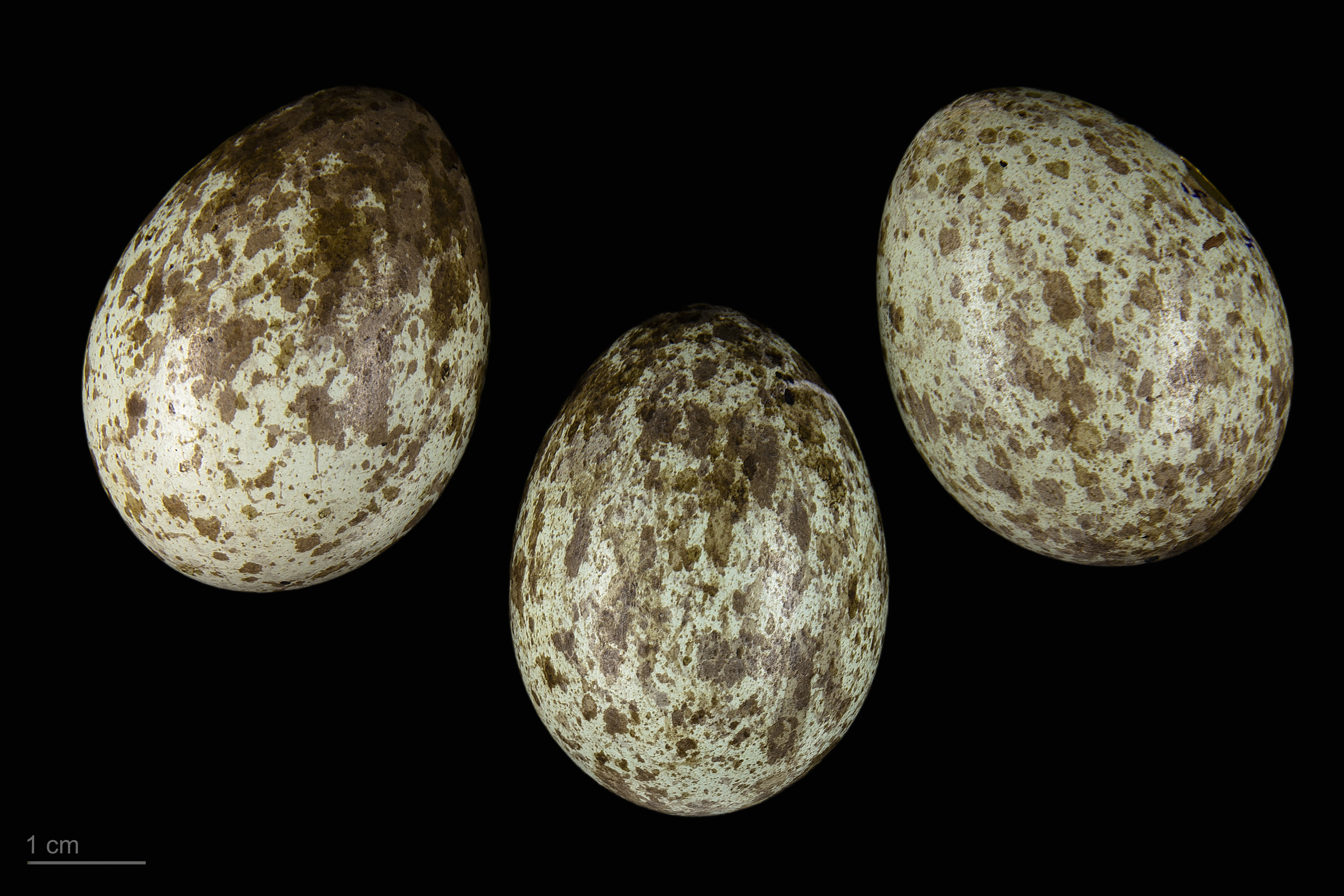
Eggs of Corvus corone cornix - MHNT

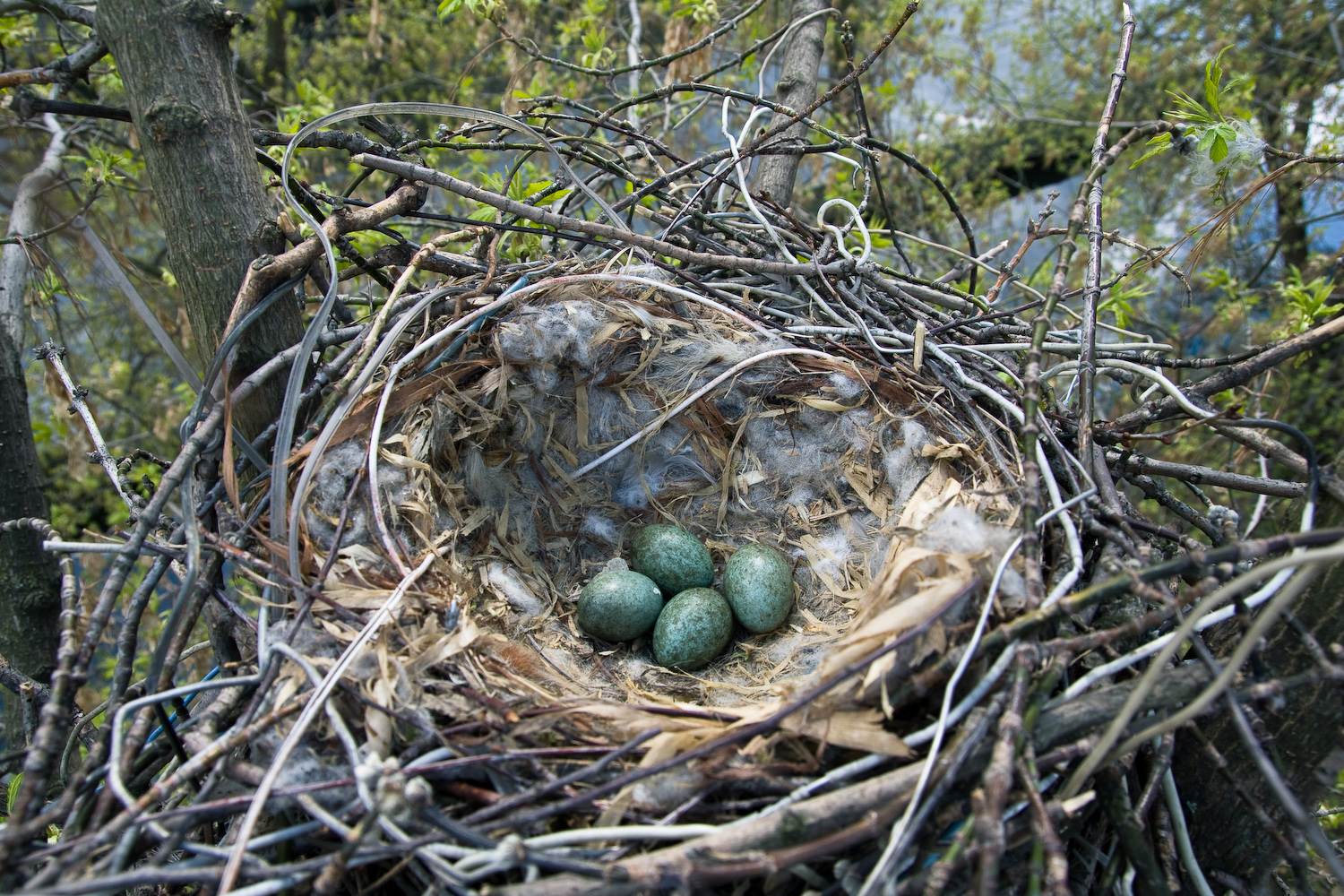
Nest with eggs in urban environment, Moscow

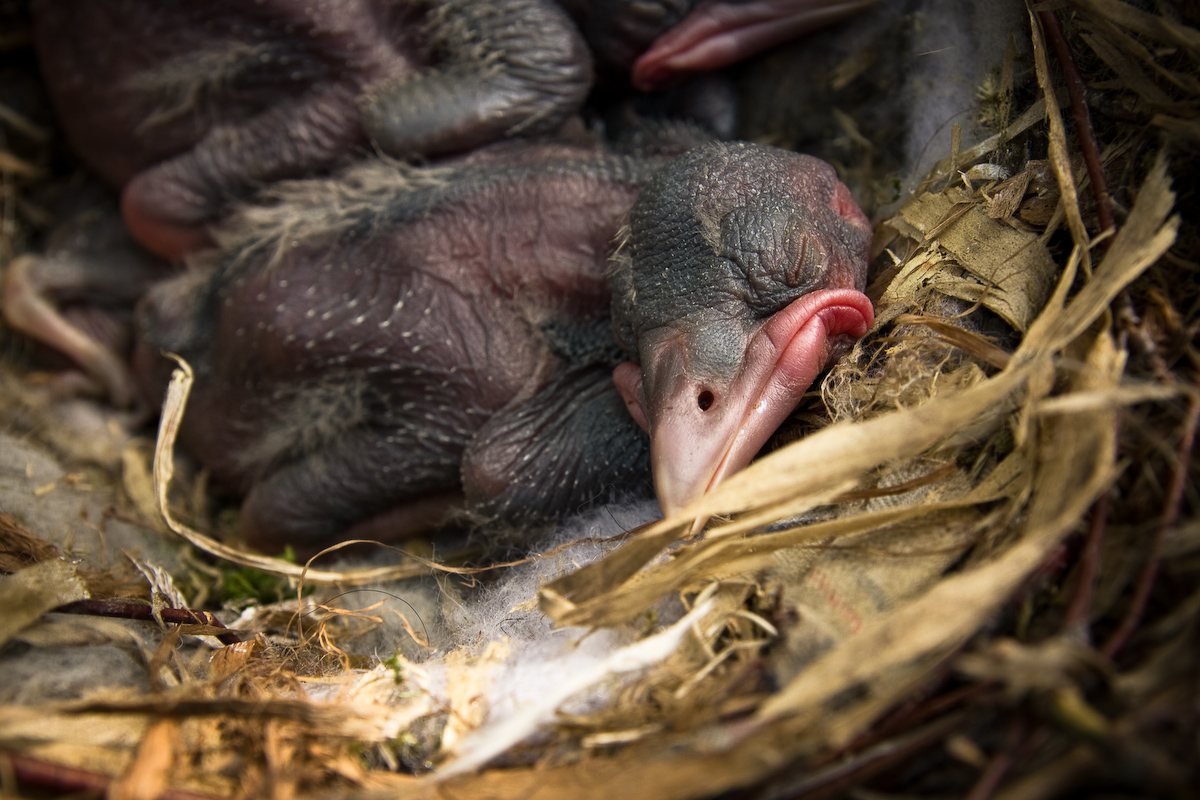
Ten-day-old chicks

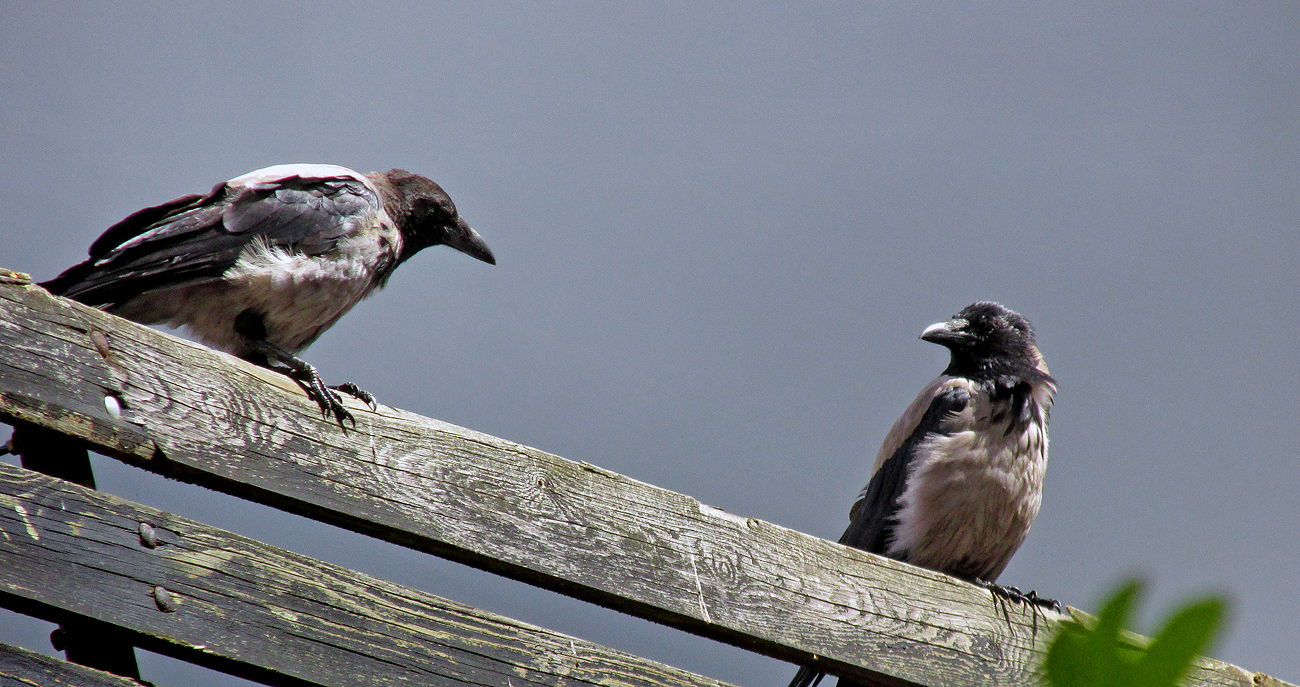
Juvenile hooded crows in Sweden

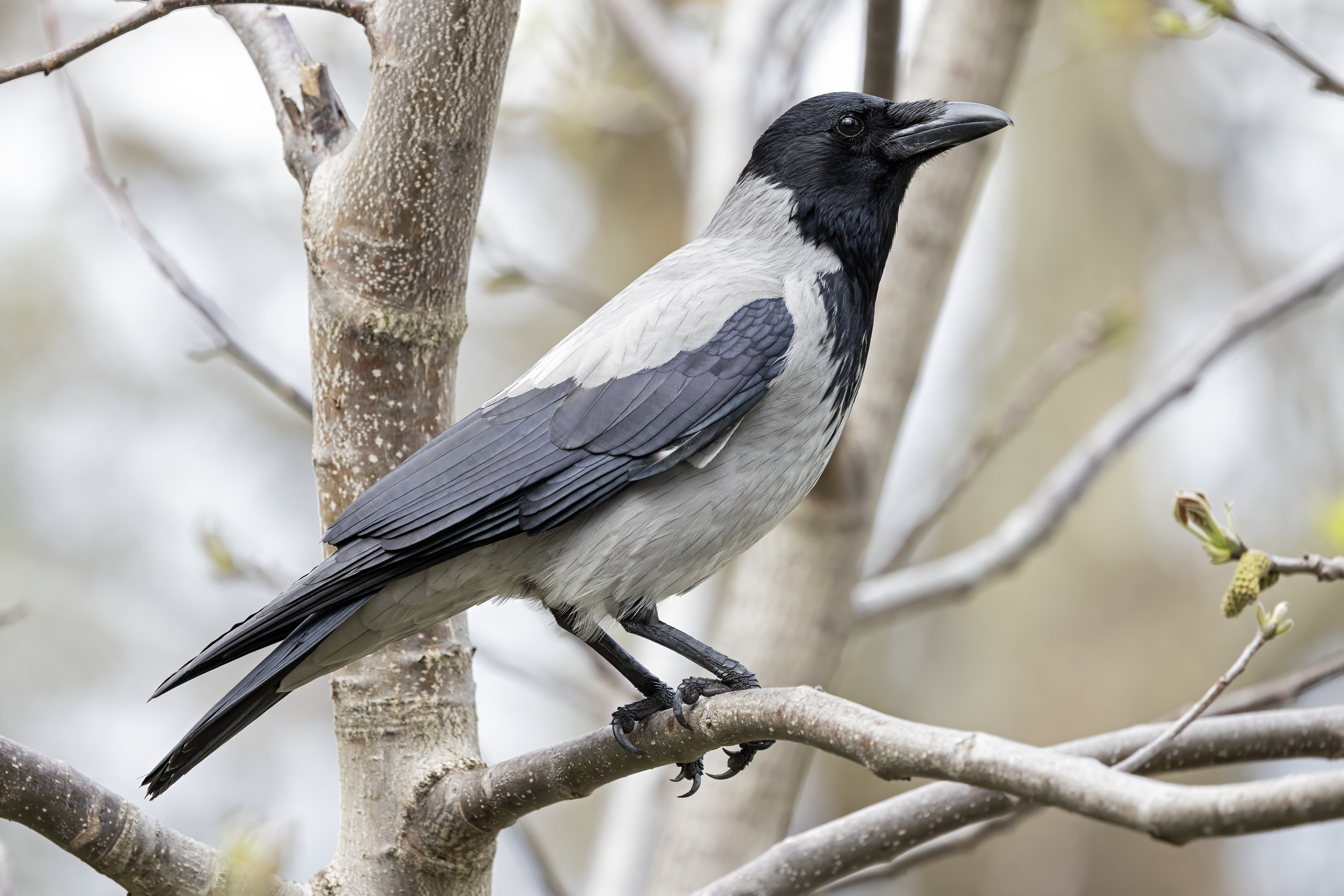
Adult, Skopje, North Macedonia

== Status ==
The IUCN Red List does not distinguish the hooded crow from the carrion crow, but the two species together have an extensive range, estimated at 10 million square kilometres (4 million square miles), and a large population, including an estimated 14 to 34 million individuals in Europe alone. They are not believed to approach the thresholds for the population decline criterion of the IUCN Red List (i.e., declining more than 30% in ten years or three generations), so are evaluated as least concern. The carrion crow and hooded crow hybrid zone is slowly spreading northwest, but the hooded crow has on the order of three million territories in just Europe (excluding Russia). This movement is also attested to by the fact that in April 2020 the hooded crow was redlisted in Sweden, where the Species Information Centre does distinguish between hooded and carrion crow.

== Cultural significance ==
In Irish folklore, the bird appears on the shoulder of the dying Cú Chulainn, and could also be a manifestation of the Morrígan, the wife of Tethra, or the Cailleach. This idea has persisted, and the hooded crow is associated with fairies in the Scottish highlands and Ireland; in the 18th century, Scottish shepherds would make offerings to them to keep them from attacking sheep. In Faroese folklore, a maiden would go out on Candlemas morn and throw a stone, then a bone, then a clump of turf at a hooded crow – if it flew over the sea, her husband would be a foreigner; if it landed on a farm or house, she would marry a man from there, but if it stayed put, she would remain unmarried.

The old name of Royston crow originates from the days when this bird was a common winter visitor to southern England, with the sheep fields around Royston, Hertfordshire providing carcasses on which the birds could feed. The local newspaper, founded in 1855, is called The Royston Crow, and the hooded crow also features on the town's coat of arms.

The hooded crow is one of the 37 Norwegian birds depicted in the Bird Room of the Royal Palace in Oslo.
