= The Weston & Somerset Mercury =

Local newspaper

The Weston, Worle & Somerset Mercury
- Type: Weekly newspaper
- Owner: USA Today Co.
- Publisher: Newsquest
- Founded: 1943
- Circulation: 3,348 (as of 2023)
- Website: thewestonmercury.co.uk

The Weston, Worle & Somerset Mercury is a weekly paid for newspaper that covers Weston-super-Mare and the surrounding areas of Somerset and North Somerset in England. The Weston Mercury was established 1 April 1843 and was family-owned for much of its history. The Somerset Mercury is a regional edition of The Weston & Somerset Mercury which covers the Cheddar and Axbridge area of Somerset.

It is published by Newsquest.

It has won the Newspaper Society's Community Newspaper of the year award numerous times, most recently in 2007 and 2008.

Its office is in the heart of Weston town centre. Also based in the Weston office is the Mercury's sister paper, the North Somerset Times, and the Midweek Mercury, a free weekly newspaper which incorporates the former free advert paper Admag.
