= Royston Crow (newspaper) =

Weekly newspaper published in Royston, Hertfordshire

- Type: Weekly newspaper
- Owner: USA Today Co.
- Founder: John Warren
- Publisher: Newsquest
- Founded: 1855
- Circulation: 7,034 (as of 2023)
- Website: royston-crow.co.uk

The Royston Crow is a newspaper published in Royston, Hertfordshire, England. It was founded by John Warren in 1855. The newspaper is now a weekly publication, part of the Archant group. The newspaper's name is taken from a local name for the bird hooded crow (Corvus cornix).

== See also ==
- Carrion crow
