= North Devon Gazette =

The North Devon Gazette is a weekly free newspaper published in Barnstaple, England, on Wednesdays for the North Devon area, including Barnstaple, Bideford, Ilfracombe and South Molton. Since 2008, the newspaper has been available in full, in its published layout, online.

It is owned by Clear Sky Publishing and its sister papers are the Torbay Weekly, and the Moorlander.
