= Newsquest =

Regional and local newspaper publisher in UK

Newsquest Media Group Limited
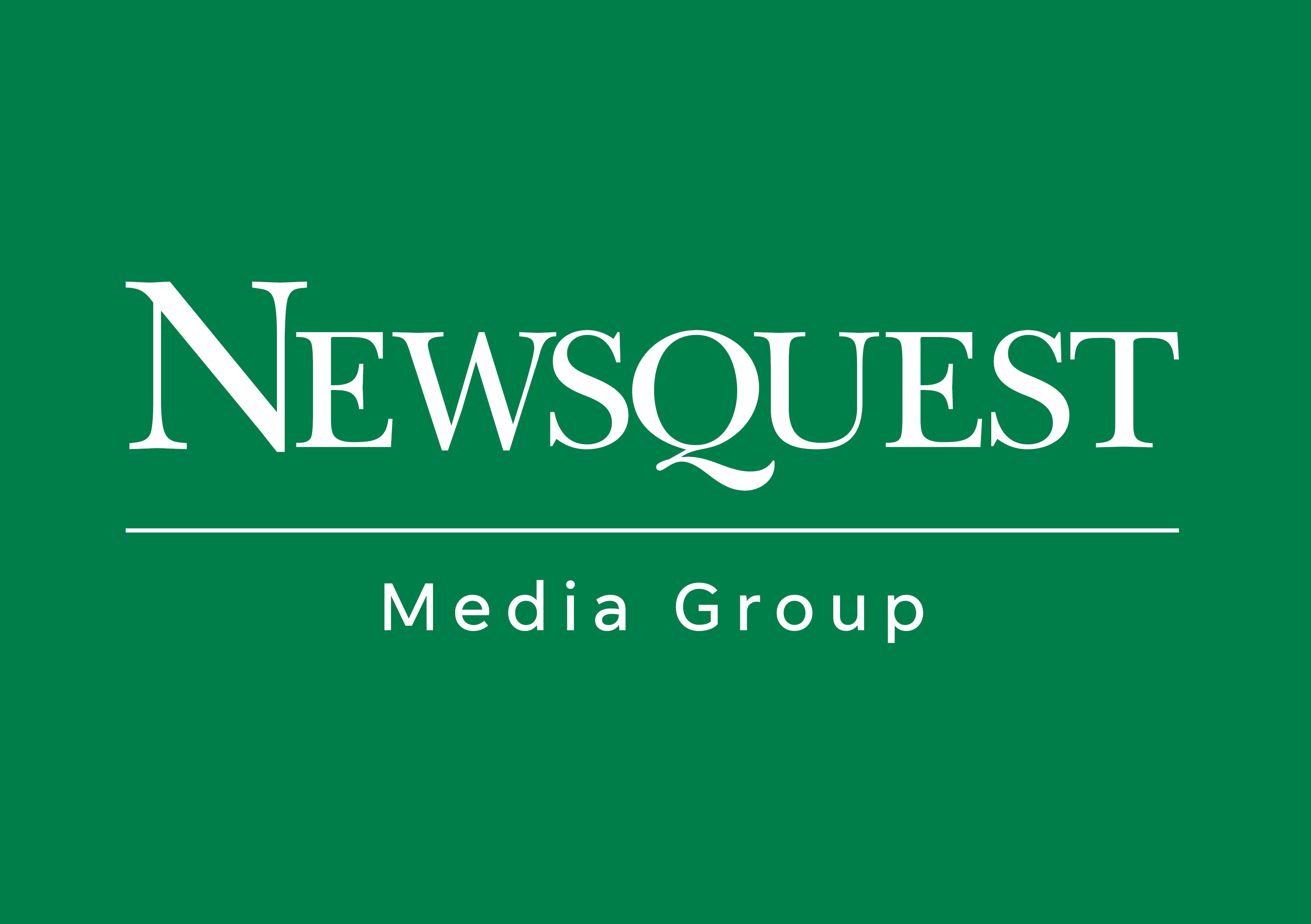
- Type: Subsidiary
- Industry: Media
- Founded: 1995; 31 years ago
- Headquarters: London, England, UK
- Key people: Henry Faure Walker (CEO)
- Products: Newspapers
- Net income: ▲114 million (2021)
- Total assets: ▼61 million (2021)
- Total equity: ▲189 million (2021)
- Number of employees: 5,000
- Parent: USA Today Co.
- Website: newsquest.co.uk

Newsquest Media Group Limited is the second largest publisher of regional and local newspapers in the United Kingdom. It is owned by the American mass media holding company USA Today Co.

It has 205 brands across the UK, publishing online and in print (165 newspaper brands and 40 magazine brands) and reaches 28 million visitors a month online and 6.5 million readers a week in print.

Based in London, Newsquest employs a total of more than 5,500 people across the UK. It also has a specialist arm that publishes both consumer and business-to-business (B2B) titles such as Insurance Times and The Strad.

== History ==
Newsquest was founded in 1995 when United States private equity partnership KKR financed a £210 million management buy-out of the Reed Regional Newspapers group of British papers from Reed Elsevier.

In 1996 Newsquest swapped its Yorkshire titles for Johnston Press's Bury, Greater Manchester area titles and £9.25 million, sold some of its titles in the English Midlands to Midland Independent Newspapers and bought the Westminster Press local newspapers group for £305 million from Pearson, owner of Penguin Books and the Financial Times, resulting in Newsquest doubling in size. The next year it floated on the London Stock Exchange, realising a market capitalisation of £500 million. In 1998, Newsquest added the Sussex based Contact-a-Car, the London Property Weekly titles, two titles in North West England, and three Review Group titles in Hertfordshire.

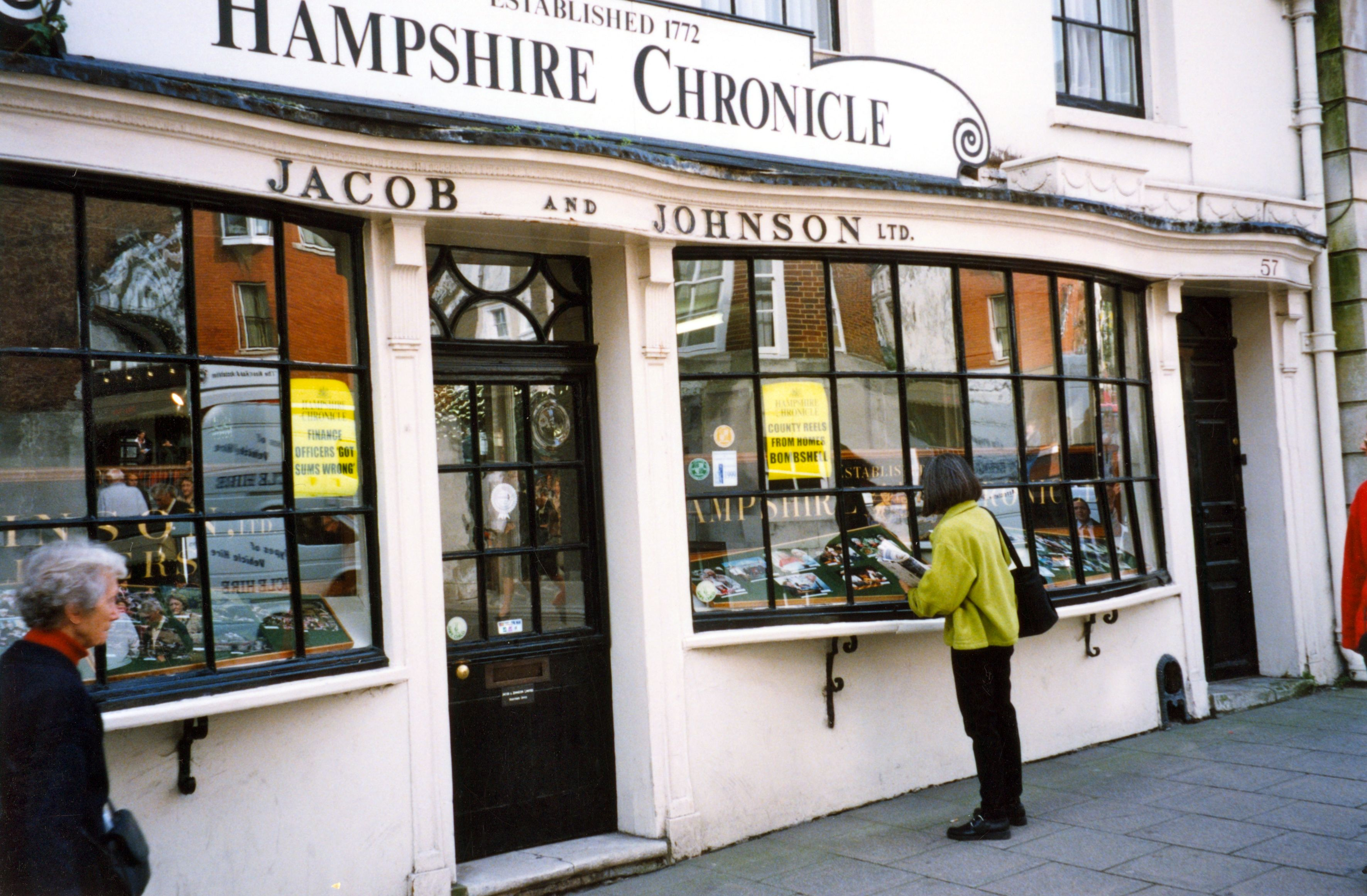
Exterior of Hampshire Chronicle office, 1999

In 1999, Gannett's newly formed UK subsidiary paid £922 million (about US $1.5 billion) for Newsquest and took on the company's debt. In 2000, Gannett paid £525 million for Southampton-based News Communications and Media's South Coast dailies and weeklies – and its Southernprint magazine printing division – to add to Newsquest's portfolio. It also picked up the regional newspapers business – outside Manchester – of the Guardian Media Group, a takeover that the cleared as there was "no overlap, in the companies' circulation areas".

In 2001, Newsquest bought Surrey and Sussex Publishing and Horley Publishing, publishers of Gatwick Life and Horley Life and the Dimbleby Newspaper Group's nine Greater London weeklies, including the Richmond & Twickenham Times for a reported £8 million.

In 2003, Gannett UK paid £216 million for the Scottish Media Group's three newspapers – Glasgow's Herald, Sunday Herald and Evening Times – 11 specialist consumer and business-to-business magazines and an online advertising and content business. The Competition Commission again inquired into this purchase, but later cleared it.

In 2005, Newsquest's Exchange Enterprises division paid £50.25 million for Exchange & Mart and Auto Exchange from United Advertising Publications after the small ads weeklies' publisher's parent, United Business Media, decided to concentrate on its 'core activities'.

Newsquest also owned the formerly-named Brentford, Chiswick and Isleworth Times, later known as the Hounslow and Brentford Times, which closed in 2010.

On 11 December 2006, Gannett denied having plans to sell Newsquest, contradicting a story in the previous day's Sunday Express that claimed the media giant was carrying out a company review with the Credit Suisse investment bank, and could sell Newsquest for up to £1.5 billion. Gannett had replied by saying: "There is no truth in the report. Newsquest is a valuable part of the Gannett company."

On 2 July 2007, in his blog on The Guardian's website, media analyst Roy Greenslade revealed the content of a Newsquest company memo which acknowledged that its staff pension scheme was £65 million in deficit.

The company's U.S. parent Gannett had on 18 June reported that revenues from its newspapers and broadcasting had fallen – but, the US press release said: 'Newsquest experienced higher national advertising revenue'.

In August 2007, Newsquest started offering users of its Greater London titles' websites downloadable supermarket coupons which could be redeemed for a range of goods at major supermarket chains, with plans to roll out the scheme to its other publications.

In March 2012, The Guardian reported the results of an indicative ballot held by the National Union of Journalists among its members at Newsquest, which found that more than 80% were prepared to strike if they were not given a pay rise within the year.

In April 2014, following CEO/Chairman Paul Davidson's retirement, Henry Faure Walker was appointed CEO at Newsquest.

In November 2014, publication began of The National, a Scottish daily newspaper that supports Scottish independence.

On 26 May 2015, Newsquest announced that it had acquired Romanes Media Group, a local news publishing business operating in Scotland, Berkshire and Northern Ireland, for an undisclosed sum. The Romanes newspaper portfolio comprises one daily, 19 weekly paid-fors and nine weekly frees, and associated websites, and the company employs 270 staff.

In March 2022, Newsquest acquired the Archant group of regional newspapers from RCapital.

=== July 2007 industrial disputes at Newsquest's Scottish titles ===
In July 2007, the UK's Competition Commission reported that it was investigating allegations made by SNP MP for Perth and North Perthshire Pete Wishart that Newsquest had given it misleading evidence while it was considering whether the company should be permitted to take over titles from SMG. Wishart had written to the commission in June 2007 to express his concern about standards and job losses at the newspapers. Union members were holding a ballot over whether they should strike over five redundancies on the Glasgow Evening News, one of the papers bought from SMG.

On 20 July 2007, journalists at Newsquest's former-SMG titles – Glasgow Herald, Sunday Herald and Evening Times – held a 24-hour strike to protest against compulsory redundancies and cuts of up to £3 million.

Newsquest's Glasgow NUJ members went on strike again on 25 July 2007, hampering the Sunday Herald's planned re-launch. Successful union action had already led to the reinstatement on 31 July of the deputy Father (leader) of the Evening Times Chapel (office branch), Gordon Thomson.

=== New parent company ===
In 2019 it was reported that New Media Investment Group Inc., the parent company of GateHouse Media, was buying Gannett, the owners of Newsquest.

== See also ==
- List of newspapers published by Newsquest
