= Matthew Beveridge =

Canadian ice hockey player

- Born: March 18, 1975 (age 50) Toronto, Ontario, Canada
- Height: 5 ft 10 in (178 cm)
- Weight: 174 lb (79 kg; 12 st 6 lb)
- Position: Forward
- Shot: right
- Played for: Newcastle Vipers; Manchester Phoenix
- Playing career: 1996–2007

Matthew Beveridge (born March 18, 1975) is a Canadian retired professional ice hockey player. Beveridge also used to coach for Lucas Miller's Hi-Performance Hockey in Brampton, Ontario.

Beveridge was born in Toronto, Ontario. Although drafted into the OHL by the Peterborough Petes, Beveridge's senior professional career was kick started with his move to the United Kingdom in 1996, where he played for the Whitley Warriors, a team once coached by Mike Babcock. At the British National League level, he scored 100 points in just 36 games.

This productivity saw him move to Germany for the 1997/1998 term, which he spent as an ESC Dorfen player in the German second division. Once again Beveridge scored points easily, with 68 in just 50 games. He returned to the U.K. the following season and played in the BNL, although this time with the Peterborough Pirates. His points ratio of greater than a point per game helped the Pirates into the post season. A further move within the BNL followed in the summer of 2000, this time to the Paisley Pirates. Beveridge's productivity continued, this time with 48 points in 34 games.

Despite this, the Pirates failed to make the post-season and so Beveridge left for the Invicta Dynamos of the recently founded EPL. Beveridge spent three seasons in Gillingham, scoring 252 points. This prompted a chance at the higher BNL level again, with Beveridge moving north to the former ISL team the Newcastle Vipers. Through the 2003/04 and 2004/05 seasons, Beveridge was again a leading scorer for the Vipers.

As one of the leading BNL teams, the Vipers were invited to join the newly formed EIHL in 2005/06. At this higher level, Beveridge scored 25 points in 44 games and was unable to match his previous scoring rate. This led to the Vipers releasing him in the summer of 2006. His signature was quickly snapped up by the Manchester Phoenix, icing in their debut season in the EIHL. Beveridge played just three games for the Phoenix however, before re-joining Newcastle mid-season.

He failed to settle however, despite scoring 5 points in the 9 games in which he featured and another mid-season move followed, this time to the Sheffield Scimitars, the EPL team of the Sheffield Steelers organisation. Beveridge made just one appearance before moving on again however, this time to the Bracknell Bees, where he totalled a remarkable 61 points in 24 games, a ratio of almost three points per game.

At the end of the 2006/07 season, Beveridge announced his retirement from the playing side of the sport, and returned home to Ontario, where he found work as a coach for an ice hockey school in Brampton.

== Career stats ==
			Regular season					Playoffs				
Season	Team	League	GP	G	A	Pts	PIM	GP	G	A	Pts	PIM
1996-97	Whitley Warriors	BNL	36	43	57	100	16	-	-	-	-	-
1997-98	ESC Dorfen	Ger. 2	50	31	37	68	32	-	-	-	-	-
1998-99	Peterborough Pirates	BNL	30	8	23	31	16	6	2	3	5	2
1999-00	Paisley Pirates	BNL	34	14	34	48	12	-	-	-	-	-
2000-01	Invicta Dynamos	EPL	30	41	47	88	38	-	-	-	-	-
2001-02	Invicta Dynamos	EPL	26	25	34	59	10	-	-	-	-	-
2002-03	Invicta Dynamos	EPL	38	46	59	105	34	-	-	-	-	-
2003-04	Newcastle Vipers	BNL	36	18	32	50	32	-	-	-	-	-
2004-05	Newcastle Vipers	BNL	34	10	30	40	24	-	-	-	-	-
2005-06	Newcastle Vipers	EIHL	44	10	15	25	22	-	-	-	-	-
2006-07	Manchester Phoenix	EIHL	3	0	1	1	0	-	-	-	-	-
2006-07	Newcastle Vipers	EIHL	9	4	1	5	30	-	-	-	-	-
2006-07	Sheffield Scimitars	EPL	1	0	1	1	0	-	-	-	-	-
2006-07	Bracknell Bees	EPL	24	28	33	61	52	-	-	-	-	-
Career Totals			395	278	404	682	318	6	2	3	5	2

- Includes league/post season games only, correct up to 15/01/09
