= Invicta Dynamics =

Women's ice hockey team in Kent, England

- City: Gillingham, Kent
- League: WNIHL
- Division: WNIHL 2 (South)
- Home arena: Gillingham Ice Rink; Capacity: 1,000
- Colours: White, Grey & Maroon
- Head coach: Chris Gruber
- Captain: Robyn Mapp
- Website: invictadynamics.co.uk

Invicta Dynamics are a women's ice hockey team based in Gillingham in Kent, England. The club plays home games at the Gillingham Ice Bowl. Invicta compete in the Women's National Ice Hockey League (WNIHL); after winning their conference in 2025-26, the team was promoted to NIHL South A.

== History ==
Invicta Dynamics have competed in England's women's league structure since at least the 1999-2000 season. The club won the Women's National South Division 1 title in 2015-16, going undefeated (12-0) with a goal difference of +66, having finished runners-up the previous season.

As South Division 1 champions, Invicta went on to the national Division 1 playoff weekend at iceSheffield, where they were defeated 5-2 by Kingston Diamonds in the semi-final.

Following that title-winning campaign, the club stepped away from league competition for several years and came close to folding altogether around 2023. A new committee led by chairman Stuart Long, a former Elite League player, took over in September 2023 and rebuilt the club, entering a team in the Women's National Ice Hockey League 2 (WNIHL2) for the 2024-25 season - the club's first return to league hockey in eight years.

The revived side finished the 2025-26 regular season with 19 wins from 20 games, winning their conference before a semi-final playoff exit. The result earned the team promotion to NIHL South A for 2026-27. Ahead of the 2025-26 season, the EIHA renamed the WNIHL's divisions league-wide, with Invicta's tier becoming known as "WNIHL 2 South".

Invicta Dynamics are part of the wider Invicta ice hockey community based at the Gillingham Ice Bowl, alongside the men's senior Invicta Dynamos and the Invicta Mustangs, Colts, and other junior sides.

== Personnel ==
2025-26 season:

- Head Coach: Chris Gruber
- General Manager: Melissa Prowse
- Assistant coaches: Stuart Long, Sam Browne
- Captain: Robyn Mapp
- Alternate Captain: Anna Chiara Beltrami

== Honours ==
- WNIHL 2 (South) Conference Champions: 2025-26
- Women's National South Division 1 Champions: 2015/16
- Women's National South Division 1 Runners Up: 2014/15

== Home arena ==
Invicta Dynamics play home games at the Gillingham Ice Bowl, Ambley Road, Gillingham Business Park, Gillingham ME8 0PU. The rink was built in 1994 and has a capacity of approximately 1,000. Invicta Dynamics are described by Medway Council as the only ladies' ice hockey team in Kent.

== Results ==
| Season | League | Games played | Won | Draw | Loss | Goals For | Goals Against | +/- | Points | Finish |
|---|---|---|---|---|---|---|---|---|---|---|
| 2025/26 | WNIHL 2 (South) | 20 | 19 | 0 | 1 | 187 | 39 | 148 | 38 | 1st (semi-final loss) |
| 2024/25 | WNIHL 2 (South) | 10 | 5 | 0 | 5 | 30 | 50 | -20 | 10 | 4th |
| 2018/19 | UK Division 1 (W) | 16 | 1 | 3 | 12 | 20 | 77 | -57 | 3 | 8th |
| 2017/18 | UK Division 1 (W) | 16 | 8 | 2 | 6 | 72 | 74 | -2 | 18 | 5th |
| 2015/16 | Women's National South Div. 1 | 12 | 12 | 0 | 0 | 73 | 7 | 66 | 24 | 1st (champions) |
| 2014/15 | Women's National South Div. 1 | 16 | 10 | 2 | 4 | 97 | 45 | 52 | 22 | 2nd |
| 2013/14 | Women's National South Div. 1 | 16 | 10 | 0 | 6 | 81 | 42 | 39 | 20 | 4th |
| 2012/13 | Women's National South Div. 1 | 12 | 4 | 1 | 7 | 24 | 36 | -12 | 9 | 4th |
| 2011/12 | Women's National South Div. 1 | 16 | 9 | 1 | 6 | 79 | 47 | 32 | 19 | 3rd |
| 2010/11 | Women's National South Div. 1 | 18 | 7 | 1 | 10 | 44 | 83 | -39 | 15 | 6th |
| 2009/10 | Women's National South Div. 1 | 16 | 5 | 1 | 10 | 27 | 50 | -23 | 11 | 5th |
| 2008/09 | Women's National South Div. 1 | 14 | 2 | 3 | 9 | 17 | 82 | -65 | 7 | 5th |
| 2007/08 | Women's National South Div. 1 | 18 | 7 | 1 | 10 | 58 | 72 | -14 | 15 | 5th |
| 2006/07 | Women's National South Div. 1 | 18 | 4 | 2 | 12 | 40 | 81 | -41 | 10 | 8th |
| 2005/06 | Women's National South Div. 1 | 18 | 12 | 2 | 4 | 77 | 52 | 25 | 26 | 3rd |
| 2004/05 | Women's National South Div. 1 | 20 | 10 | 2 | 8 | 108 | 62 | 46 | 22 | 6th |
| 2003/04 | Women's National South Div. 1 | 18 | 10 | 2 | 6 | 113 | 67 | 46 | 22 | 4th |
| 2002/03 | Women's National South Div. 1 | 18 | 7 | 3 | 8 | 77 | 68 | 9 | 17 | 6th |
| 2001/02 | Women's National South Div. 1 | 18 | 8 | 2 | 8 | 51 | 55 | -4 | 18 | 6th |
| 2000/01 | Women's National South Div. 1 | 16 | 4 | 2 | 10 | 25 | 47 | -22 | 10 | 8th |
| 1999/00 | Women's National South Div. 1 | 14 | 4 | 1 | 9 | 19 | 48 | -29 | 9 | 5th |

Note: the club did not field a team in league competition for roughly eight seasons between 2016–17 and 2023–24 before returning in 2024–25; those years are omitted above.

== Notable players / franchise records ==
| Player | GP | Points | Note |
|---|---|---|---|
| Chelsea Meaney | 136 | 398 | Franchise all-time leading scorer; single-season record of 104 points in 2025-26 |
| Grace Drake | 108 | 324 | |
| Lucy Mewett | 54 | 186 | Highest career points-per-game (3.44) |
| Tammy Phipps | 299 | 130 | Franchise leader in games played |
| Charlotte Davenport-Jeffery | 29 | 86 | Third all-time in points-per-game (2.97) |
