= Kent =

County of England

- Non-metropolitan and ceremonial county
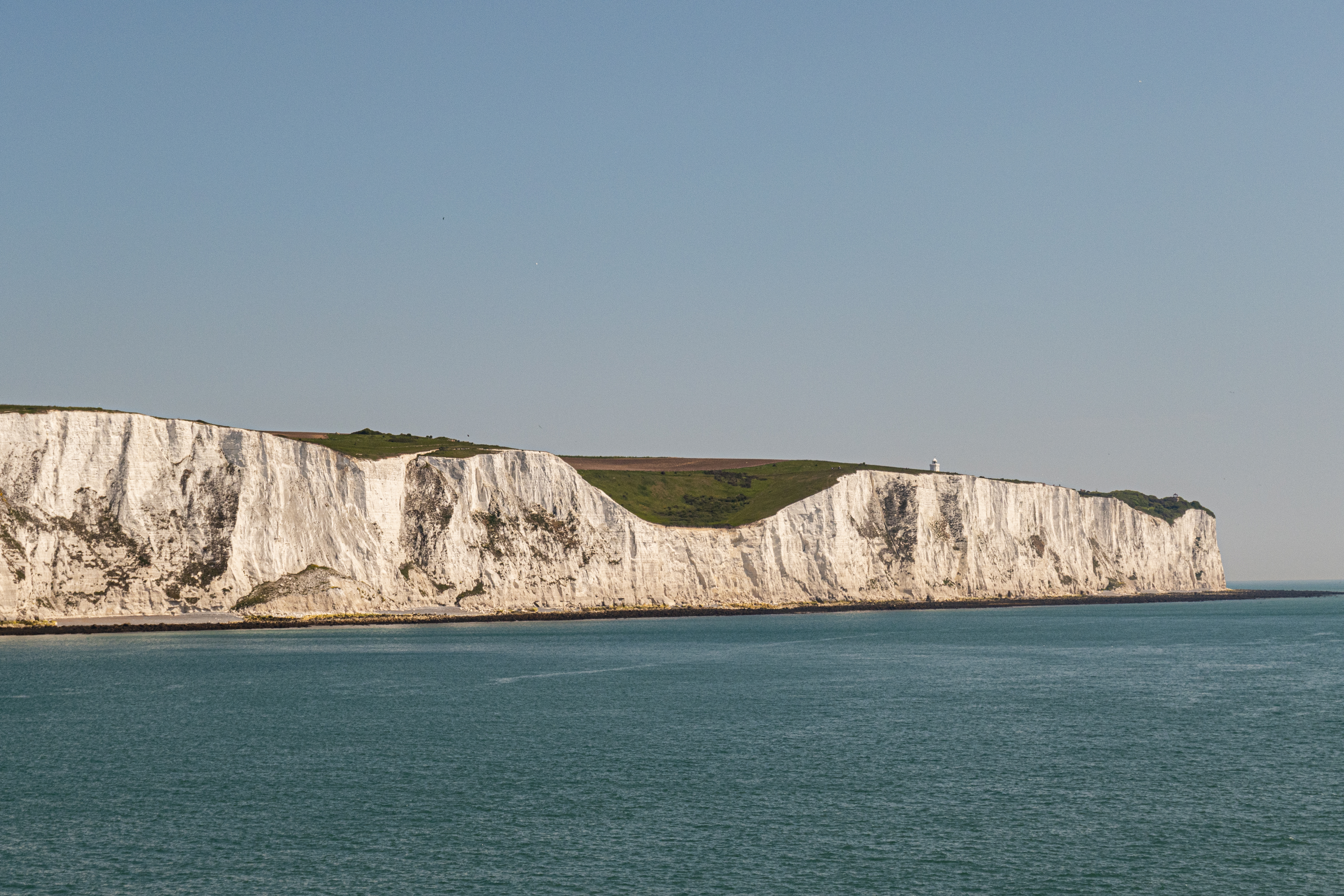
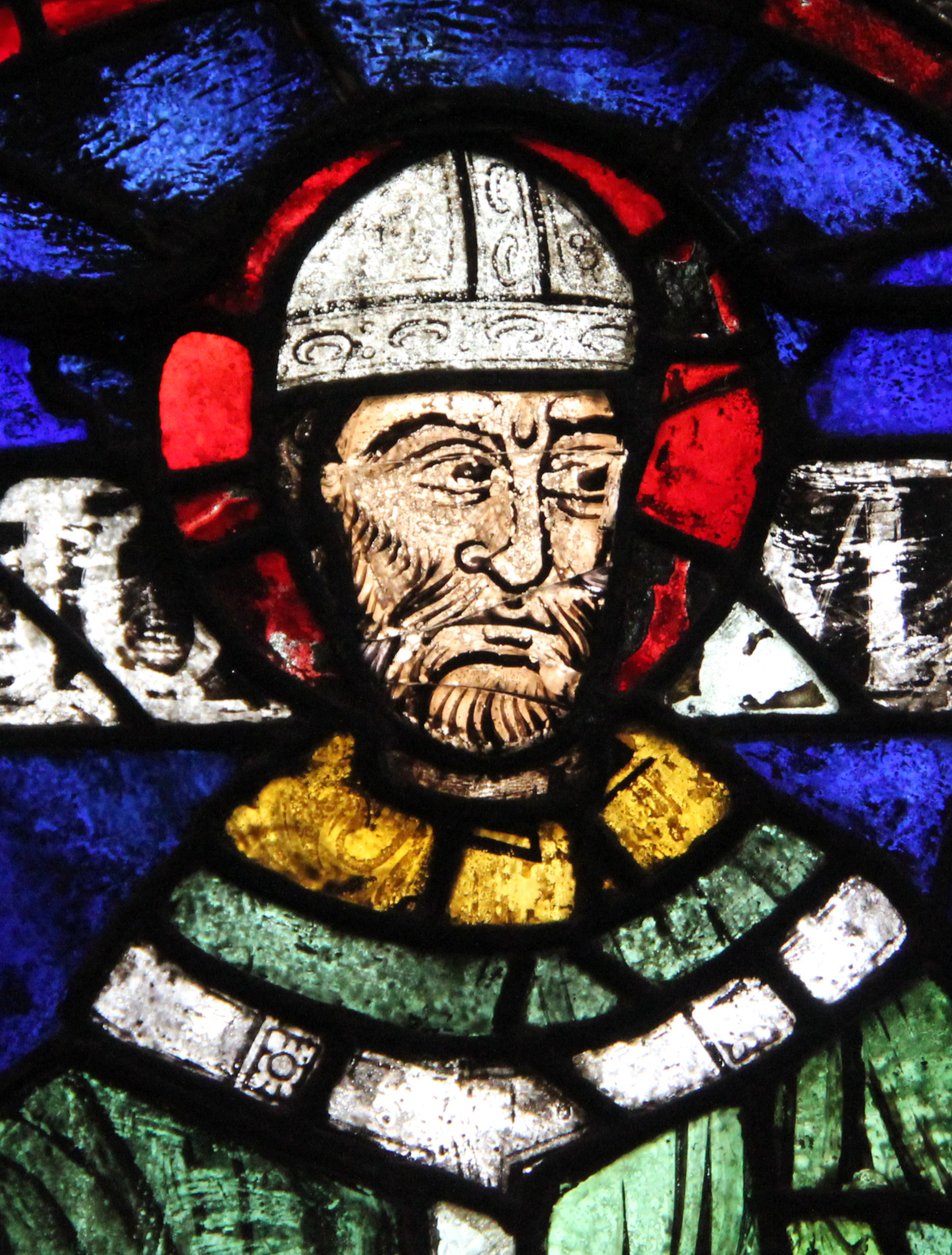
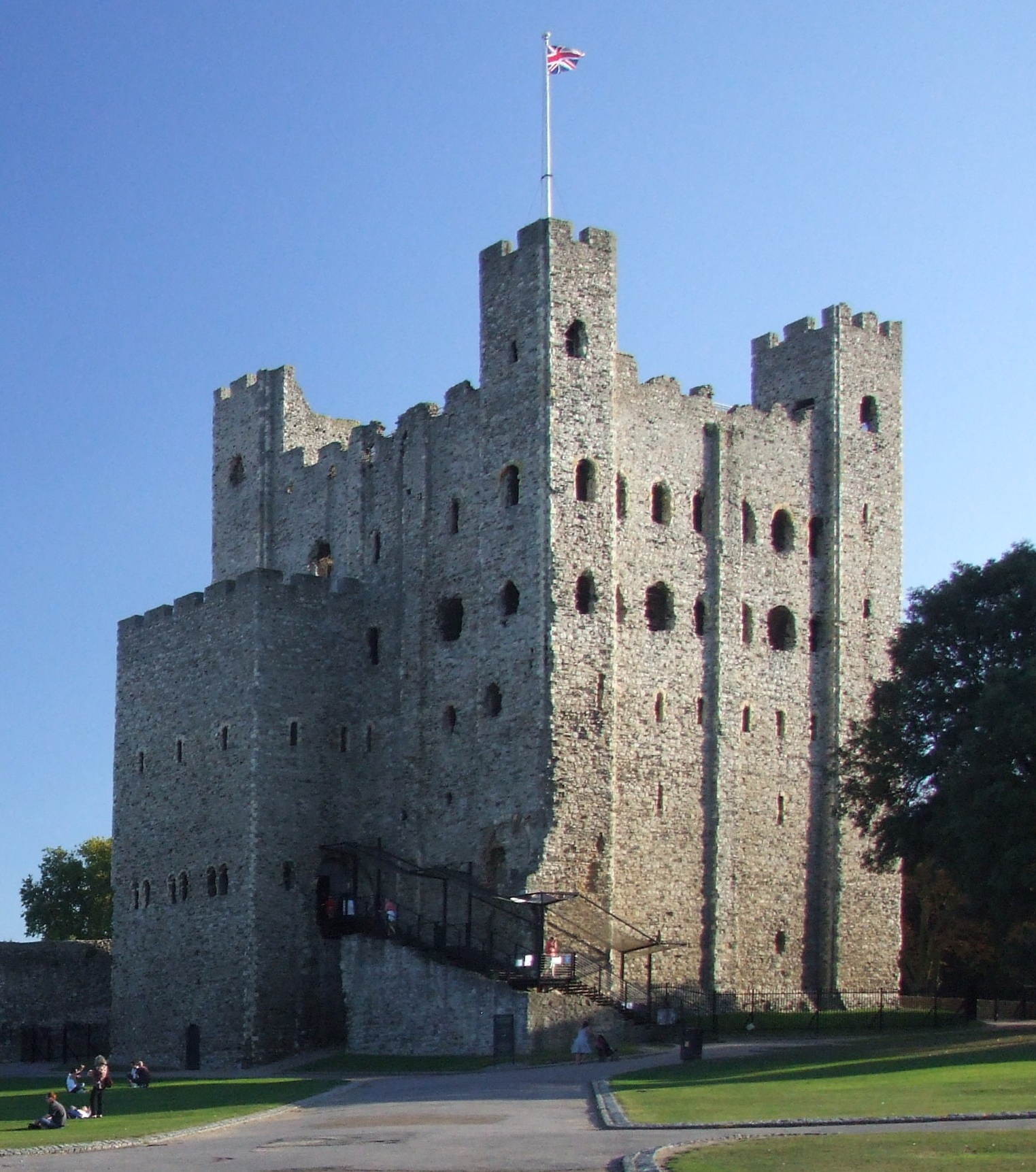
- The White Cliffs of Dover, stained glass depicting Thomas Becket in Canterbury Cathedral, and Rochester Castle

- Ceremonial Kent within England Historic Kent in the British Isles
- Coordinates: 51°12′N 0°42′E
- Sovereign state: United Kingdom
- Constituent country: England
- Region: South East
- Established: Ancient
- Time zone: UTC+0 (GMT)
  - Summer (DST): UTC+1 (BST)
- UK Parliament: List of MPs
- Police: Kent Police
- County town and largest town: Maidstone
- Ceremonial county
- Lord Lieutenant: Annabel Campbell, Baroness Colgrain
- High Sheriff: Martin Lukehurst
- Area: 3,738 km^{2} (1,443 sq mi)
  - Rank: 10th of 48
- Population (2024): 1,931,684
  - Rank: 5th of 48
  - Density: 517/km^{2} (1,340/sq mi)
- Non-metropolitan county
- County council: Kent County Council
- Control: Reform UK
- Admin HQ: Maidstone
- Area: 3,544 km^{2} (1,368 sq mi)
  - Rank: 6th of 21
- Population (2025): 1,652,769
  - Rank: 1st of 21
  - Density: 466/km^{2} (1,210/sq mi)
- ISO 3166-2: GB-KEN
- GSS code: E10000016
- ITL: UKJ42
- Website: kent.gov.uk
- Districts
- Districts of Kent; Unitary County council area
- Districts: List: Sevenoaks; Dartford; Gravesham; Tonbridge and Malling; Medway; Maidstone; Tunbridge Wells; Swale; Ashford; Canterbury; Folkestone and Hythe; Thanet; Dover

Kent is a ceremonial county in South East England. It is bordered by Essex across the Thames Estuary to the north, the Strait of Dover to the south-east, East Sussex to the south-west, Surrey to the west, and Greater London to the north-west.

The county has an area of 3,544 square kilometres (1,368 sq mi) and had an estimated population of 1,931,684 in 2024. The north-west of Kent is densely populated, with Dartford and Gravesend belonging to the Greater London conurbation and Chatham, Gillingham and Rochester forming a second conurbation around the River Medway; the town of Maidstone is to their south. The remainder of the county is more rural, and its principal settlements include the city of Canterbury in the north-east, the seaside resort of Margate on the north-east coast, and the ports of Dover and Folkestone on the east coast. For local government purposes Kent consists of a non-metropolitan county, with twelve districts, and the unitary authority area of Medway. The county historically included south-east Greater London, and is one of the home counties.

The north of Kent is a plain bordering the Thames Estuary. South of this is the North Downs, a chalk downland ridge which crosses the county from north-west to south-east and which forms dramatic chalk cliffs, including the White Cliffs of Dover, where it meets the English Channel. The south-west of the county contains part of the Greensand Ridge and the Weald, the area between the North and South Downs. The south-east of the county contains the low-lying Romney Marsh. The North Downs and High Weald have been designated national landscapes. The geography of the county lends itself to the cultivation of fruit orchards, and it has been nicknamed "the Garden of England". In north-west Kent, industries include aggregate building material extraction, printing, and scientific research. Coal mining has also played its part in the county's industrial heritage.

Kent's location between London and the Strait of Dover, the narrowest crossing point between England and mainland Europe, has led to the county being the point of entry for many prominent figures and groups in British history. It was one of the first British territories to be settled by Germanic tribes, most notably the Jutes, following the withdrawal of the Romans. In the 6th century, Saint Augustine landed in the county to begin the conversion of England to Christianity and became the first archbishop of Canterbury; Canterbury Cathedral is now a World Heritage Site. England relied on the county's ports to provide warships through much of its history; the Cinque Ports in the 10th–14th centuries and Chatham Dockyard in the 16th–20th centuries were of particular importance. Dover Castle has been described as the "key of England" due to its strategic significance.

== Etymology ==
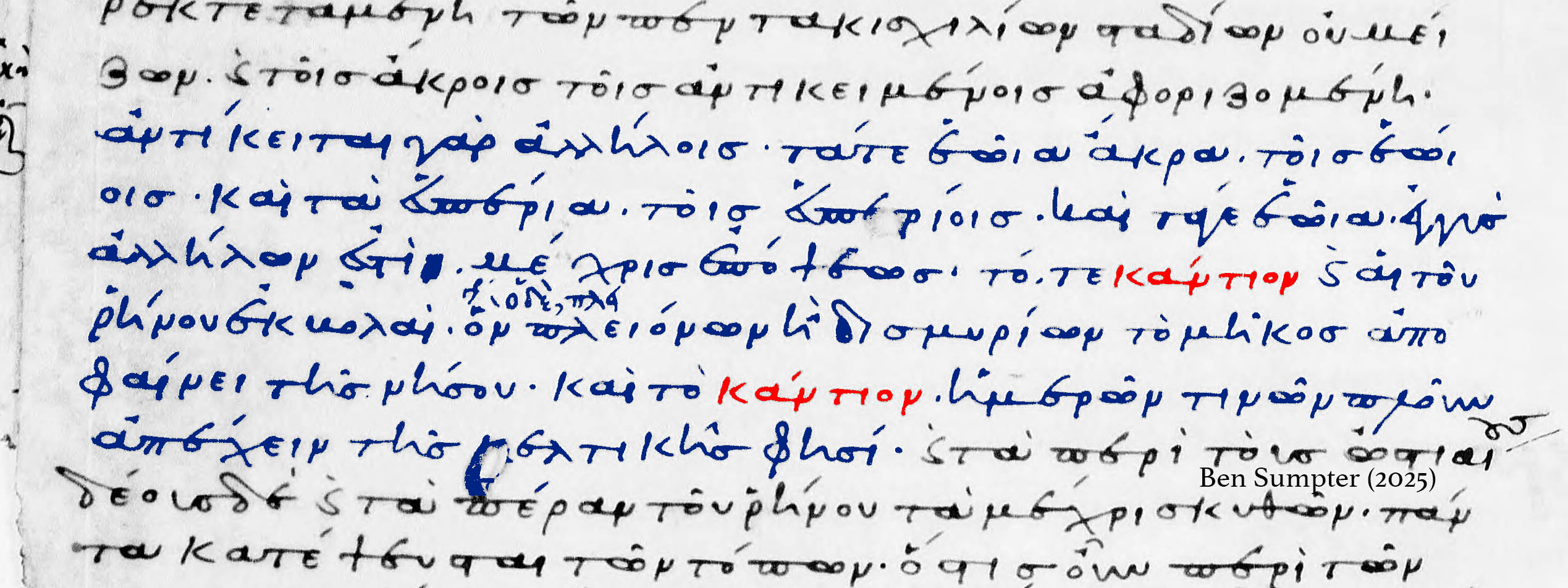
Kent in Strabo's Geographica (1.4.3) from a 10th-century manuscript.

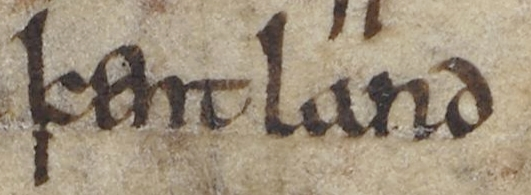
Kent, as it appears in the Anglo-Saxon Chronicle between 11th and 12th centuries

The name is of Celtic origin and is one of the oldest place names of the British Isles still in use today, being first recorded in a periplus in Ancient Greek of the c. 320s B.C. by Pytheas. The original work, which does not survive, is quoted explicitly by Strabo (Geog. 1.4.3) and implicitly by Diodorus (BH 5.21).

ὁ δὲ πλειόνων ἢ δισμυρίων τὸ μῆκος ἀποφαίνει τῆς νήσου, καὶ τὸ Κάντιον ἡμερῶν τινων πλοῦν ἀπέχειν τῆς Κελτικῆς φησι

Translation:

Yet he [Pytheas] declares that the extent of the island is more than 20,000 stadia and says that Kantion is several days' sail from Keltike.

As such, it has been claimed as the "oldest recorded name still in use in England".

The meaning has been explained as 'coastal district', 'corner-land' or 'land on the edge' (Welsh: cant 'bordering of a circle, tyre, edge'; Breton: cant 'circle'; Dutch: kant 'side, edge'). In Latin sources the area is called Cantia or Cantium, while the Anglo-Saxons referred to it as Cent, Cent lond or Centrīċe.

== History ==
The area was first occupied by early humans, intermittently due to periods of extreme cold, during the Palaeolithic (Old Stone Age), as attested by an early Neanderthal skull found in the quarries at Swanscombe. The Medway megaliths were built during the Neolithic era. There is a rich sequence of Bronze Age, Celtic Iron Age, and Britto-Roman era occupation, as indicated by finds and features such as the Ringlemere gold cup and the Roman villas of the Darent valley.

Julius Caesar described the area as Cantium, or the home of the Cantiaci, in 51 BC. The extreme west of the modern county was by the time of Roman Britain occupied by a Celtic Iron Age tribe known as the Regni. Caesar wrote that the people of Kent were "by far the most civilised inhabitants of Britain".

The flag of the historic county of Kent

Following the withdrawal of the Romans, large numbers of Germanic speakers from mainland Europe settled in Kent, bringing their language, which came to be Old English. While they expelled the native Romano-British population, some likely remained in the area, eventually assimilating with the newcomers. Of the invading tribes, the Jutes were the most prominent, and the area became a Jutish kingdom recorded as Cantia in about 730 and Cent in 835. The early medieval inhabitants of the county were referred to as the Cantwara, or Kentish people. The city of Canterbury was the largest in Kent.

In 597, Pope Gregory I appointed the religious missionary (who became Saint Augustine of Canterbury after his death) as the first Archbishop of Canterbury. In the previous year, Augustine successfully converted the pagan King Æthelberht of Kent to Christianity. The Diocese of Canterbury became England's first Episcopal See with first cathedral and has since remained England's centre of Christianity. The second designated English cathedral was for West Kent at Rochester Cathedral.

Kent was traditionally partitioned into East and West Kent, and into lathes and hundreds. The traditional border of East and West Kent was the county's main river, the Medway. Men and women from east of the Medway are Men (or Maids) of Kent, those from the west are Kentishmen or Kentish Maids. The divide has been explained by some as originating in the Anglo-Saxon migrations, with Jutes mainly settling east of the Medway and Saxons settling west of it.

In the 11th century, the people of Kent (or Chenth, per the Domesday Book) adopted the motto Invicta, meaning "undefeated" or "unconquered". The adoption of this motto followed the Norman Conquest of England by William the Conqueror, as he was unable to subdue the county and they negotiated favourable terms. The continued resistance of the Kentish people against the Normans led to Kent's designation as a semi-autonomous county palatine in 1067. Under the nominal rule of William's half-brother Odo of Bayeux, the county was granted similar powers to those granted in the areas bordering Wales and Scotland.

During the medieval and early modern period, Kent played a major role in several of England's most notable rebellions, including the Peasants' Revolt of 1381, led by Wat Tyler, Jack Cade's Kent rebellion of 1450, and Wyatt's rebellion of 1554 against Queen Mary I.

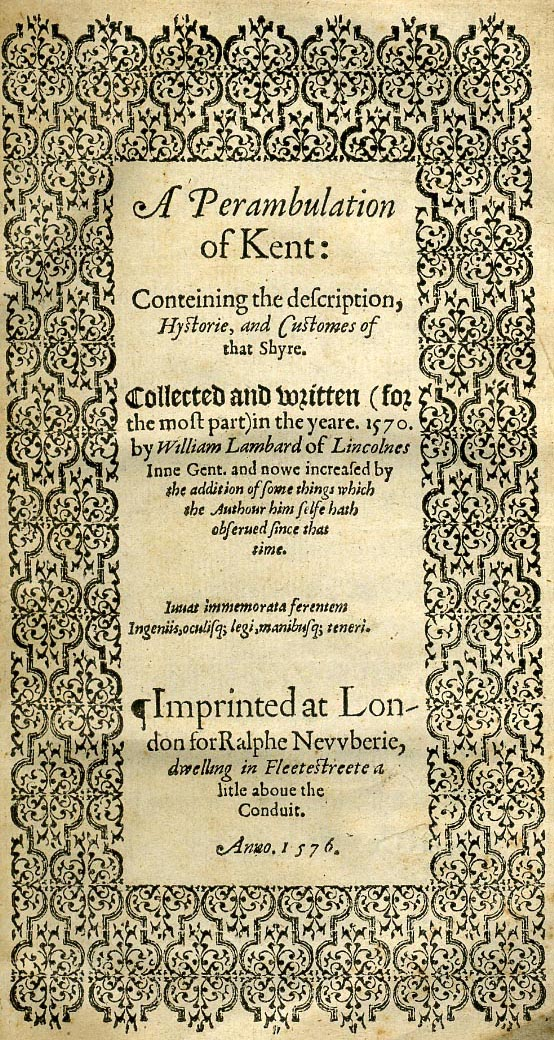
Title page of William Lambarde's Perambulation of Kent (completed in 1570 and published in 1576), a historical description of Kent and the first published county history

The Royal Navy first used the River Medway in 1547. By the reign of Elizabeth I (1558–1603) a small dockyard had been established at Chatham. By 1618, storehouses, a ropewalk, a drydock, and houses for officials had been built downstream from Chatham.

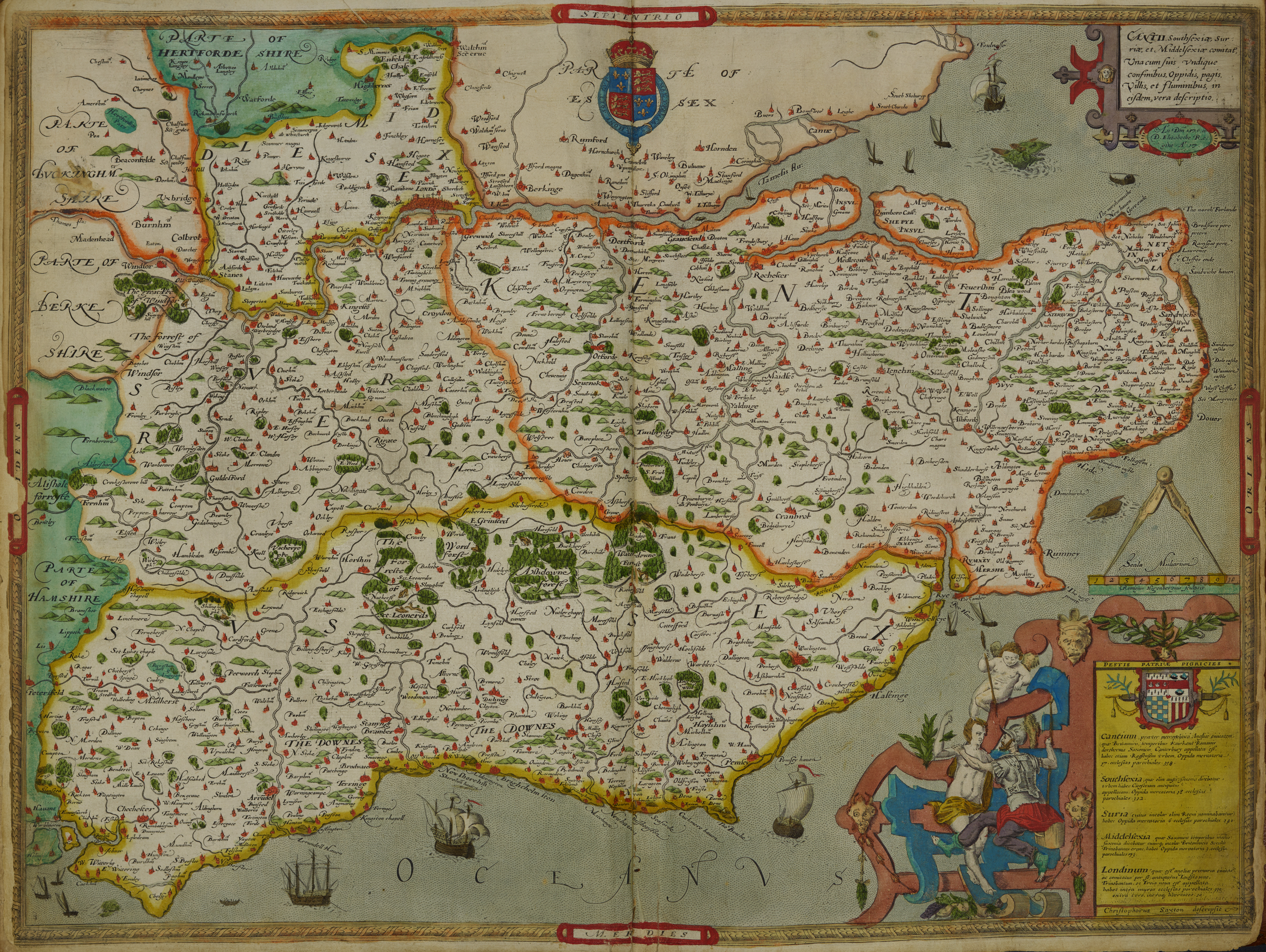
Hand-drawn map of Kent, Sussex, Surrey and Middlesex from 1575

By the 17th century, tensions between Britain and the powers of the Netherlands and France led to increasing military build-up in the county. Forts were built all along the coast following the raid on the Medway, a successful attack by the Dutch navy on the shipyards of the Medway towns in 1667.

The 18th century was dominated by wars with France, during which the Medway became the primary base for a fleet that could act along the Dutch and French coasts. When the theatre of operation moved to the Atlantic, this role was assumed by Portsmouth and Plymouth, with Chatham concentrating on shipbuilding and ship repair. As an indication of the area's military importance, the first Ordnance Survey map ever drawn was a one-inch map of Kent, published in 1801. Many of the Georgian naval buildings still stand.

In the early 19th century, smugglers were very active on the Kent coastline. Gangs such as The Aldington Gang brought spirits, tobacco and salt to the county, and transported goods such as wool across the sea to France.

In 1889, the County of London was created and took over responsibility for local administration of parts of north-west Kent. These included the towns of Greenwich, Woolwich, Plumstead, Deptford, Lee, Eltham, Charlton, and Kidbrooke. In 1900, however, Kent absorbed the district of Penge. Some of Kent is contiguous with the Greater London sprawl, notably parts of Dartford.

Originally, the border between Kent and Sussex (later East Sussex) ran through the towns of Tunbridge Wells and Lamberhurst. In 1894, by the Local Government Act, the parts of these towns that lay in East Sussex were absorbed by Kent.

During the Second World War, much of the Battle of Britain was fought in the skies over Kent.

Between June 1944 and March 1945, more than 10,000 V1 flying bombs, or "Doodlebugs", were fired towards London from bases in Northern France. Although many were destroyed by aircraft, anti-aircraft guns and barrage balloons, both London and Kent were hit by around 2,500 of these bombs.

After the war, Kent's borders changed several more times. In 1965, the London boroughs of Bromley and Bexley were created from nine towns formerly in Kent. In 1998, Rochester, Strood, Chatham, Gillingham and Rainham left the administrative county of Kent to form the unitary authority of Medway. Plans for another unitary authority in northwest Kent were dropped, but in 2016 consultations began between five Kent local authorities (Canterbury, Thanet, Dover, Folkestone & Hythe, and Ashford) with a view to forming a new unified authority for East Kent, although remaining within the auspices of Kent County Council. This idea was eventually dropped.

For almost nine centuries, a small part of present-day East London (the North Woolwich, London E16 area), formed part of Kent.

== Geography ==
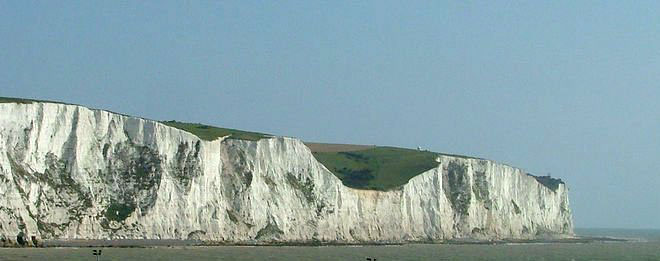
The White Cliffs of Dover

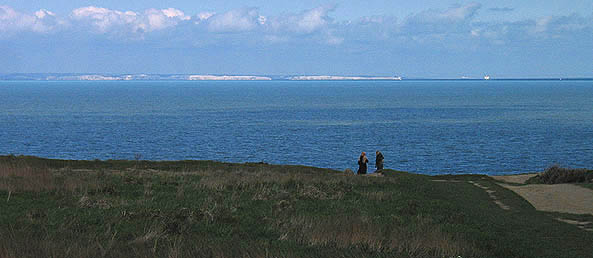
View of the White Cliffs of Dover from France

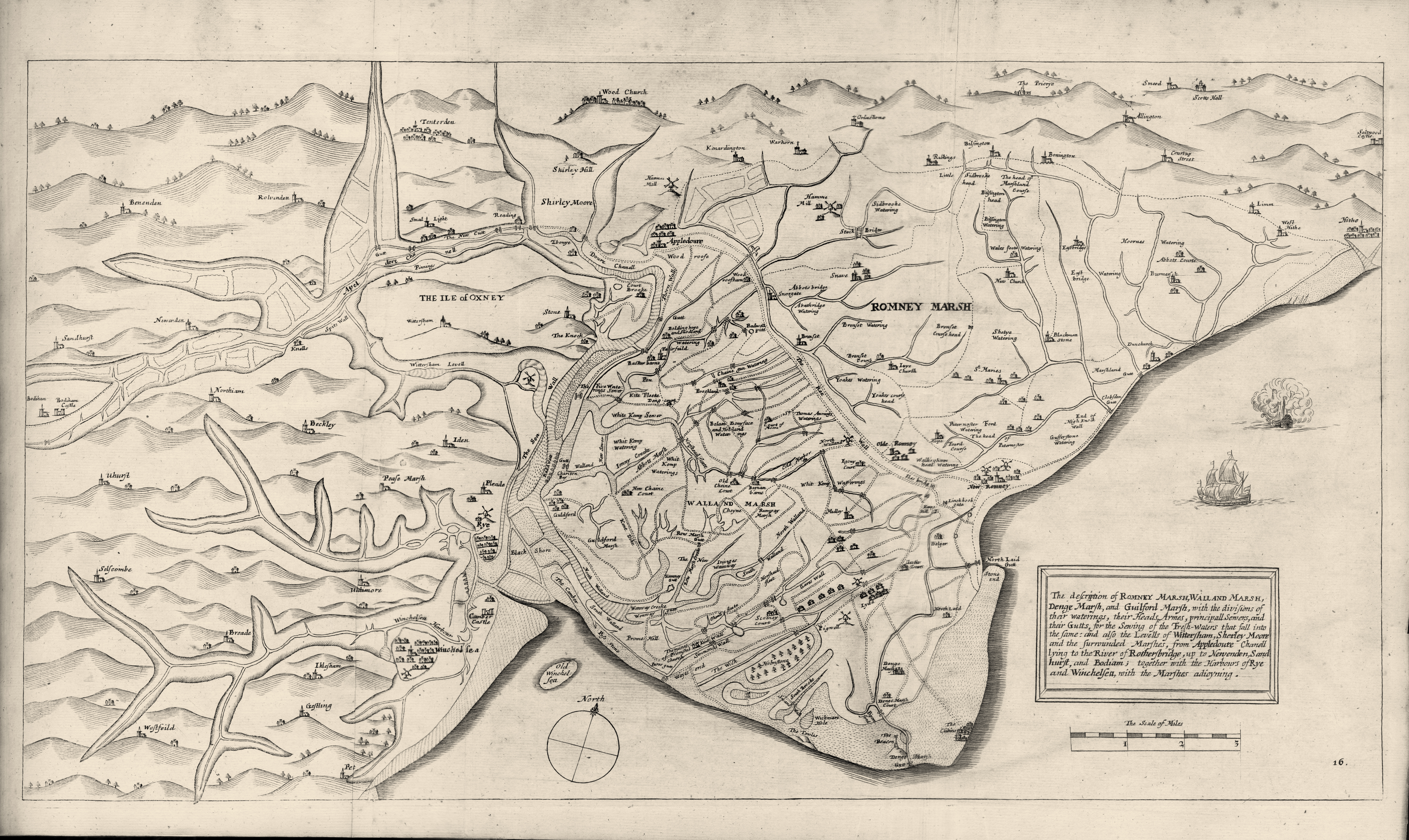
A map of Romney Marsh "The history of imbanking and drayning" by William Dugdale (1662)

Kent is in the southeastern corner of England. It borders the Thames Estuary and the North Sea to the north, and the Straits of Dover and the English Channel to the south. France is 21 miles (34 km) across the Strait.

The major geographical features of the county are based on a series of ridges and valleys running east–west across the county. These are the results of erosion of the Wealden dome, a dome across Kent and Sussex created by alpine movements 20–10 million years ago. This dome consists of an upper layer of chalk above successive layers of Upper Greensand, Gault Clay, Lower Greensand, Weald Clay, and Wealden sandstone. The ridges and valleys formed when the exposed clay eroded faster than the exposed chalk, greensand, or sandstone.

Sevenoaks, Maidstone, Ashford, and Folkestone are built on greensand, while Tonbridge and Tunbridge Wells are built on sandstone. Dartford, Gravesend, the Medway towns, Sittingbourne, Faversham, Canterbury, Deal, and Dover are built on chalk. The easterly section of the Wealden dome has been eroded away by the sea, and cliffs such as the White Cliffs of Dover are present where a chalk ridge known as the North Downs meets the coast. Spanning Dover and Westerham is the Kent Downs Area of Outstanding Natural Beauty.

The Wealden dome is a Mesozoic structure lying on a Palaeozoic foundation, which can often create the right conditions for coal formation. This is found in East Kent roughly between Deal, Canterbury, and Dover. The Coal Measures within the Westphalian Sandstone are about 820–1,310 ft (250–400 m) deep, and are subject to flooding. They occur in two major troughs, which extend under the English Channel.

Seismic activity has occasionally been recorded in Kent, though the epicentres were offshore. In 1382 and 1580 there were two earthquakes exceeding 6.0 on the Richter Scale. In 1776, 1950, and on 28 April 2007 there were earthquakes of around 4.3. The 2007 earthquake caused physical damage in Folkestone. A further quake on 22 May 2015 measured 4.2 on the Richter Scale. It was centred in the Sandwich area of east Kent at about ten miles below the surface. There was little if any damage reported.

Geological cross-section of Kent, showing how it relates to major towns

The coastline of Kent is continuously changing, due to tectonic uplift and coastal erosion. Until about 960, the Isle of Thanet was an island, separated by the Wantsum channel, formed around a deposit of chalk; over time, the channels silted up with alluvium. Similarly Romney Marsh and Dungeness have been formed by accumulation of alluvium.

Kent's principal river, the River Medway, rises near East Grinstead in Sussex and flows eastwards to Maidstone. Here it turns north and breaks through the North Downs at Rochester, then joins the estuary of the River Thames near Sheerness. The Medway is some 70 miles (112 km) long. The river is tidal as far as Allington lock, but in earlier times, cargo-carrying vessels reached as far upstream as Tonbridge. The Medway has captured the head waters of other rivers such as the River Darent. Other rivers of Kent include the River Stour in the east.

A 2014 study found that Kent shares significant reserves of shale oil with other neighbouring counties, totalling 4.4 billion barrels of oil, which then Business and Energy Minister Michael Fallon said "will bring jobs and business opportunities" and significantly help with UK energy self-sufficiency. Fracking in the area is required to achieve these objectives; it has been opposed by environmental groups.

=== Climate ===
Kent is one of the warmest parts of Britain. On 10 August 2003, in the hamlet of Brogdale near Faversham the temperature reached 38.5 °C (101.3 °F), at that time the highest temperature ever officially recorded in the United Kingdom. The record still stands as the hottest August day ever recorded.

Climate data for Wye, England (1981–2010 averages)
Month	Jan	Feb	Mar	Apr	May	Jun	Jul	Aug	Sep	Oct	Nov	Dec	Year
Mean daily maximum °C (°F)	7.4 (45.3)	7.4 (45.3)	10.3 (50.5)	12.9 (55.2)	16.3 (61.3)	19.3 (66.7)	21.8 (71.2)	21.9 (71.4)	18.8 (65.8)	14.8 (58.6)	10.7 (51.3)	7.8 (46.0)	14.1 (57.4)
Daily mean °C (°F)	4.5 (40.1)	4.4 (39.9)	6.7 (44.1)	8.7 (47.7)	12.0 (53.6)	14.7 (58.5)	17.2 (63.0)	17.2 (63.0)	14.6 (58.3)	11.2 (52.2)	7.5 (45.5)	5.0 (41.0)	10.3 (50.5)
Mean daily minimum °C (°F)	1.7 (35.1)	1.5 (34.7)	3.1 (37.6)	4.6 (40.3)	7.7 (45.9)	10.2 (50.4)	12.6 (54.7)	12.5 (54.5)	10.5 (50.9)	7.7 (45.9)	4.3 (39.7)	2.3 (36.1)	6.6 (43.9)
Average precipitation mm (inches)	71.4 (2.81)	50.3 (1.98)	48.9 (1.93)	49.1 (1.93)	50.7 (2.00)	48.8 (1.92)	48.2 (1.90)	61.8 (2.43)	55.1 (2.17)	93.0 (3.66)	83.5 (3.29)	80.3 (3.16)	741.1 (29.18)
Average rainy days	12.7	9.6	9.5	9.0	9.2	7.9	7.7	7.4	8.1	12.1	12.0	12.2	117.4
Mean monthly sunshine hours	59.6	79.6	115.3	174.1	205.2	200.1	213.7	210.3	152.2	118.2	71.9	49.8	1,649.9

== Governance ==
=== Local ===
The coat of arms of Kent County Council

Kent County Council and its twelve district councils administer most of the county (3352 km^{2}), whilst the Medway Council administers the more densely populated Medway unitary authority (192 km^{2}), independently of the county council. Together they have around 300 town and parish councils. Kent County Council's headquarters is in Maidstone, while Medway's offices are at Gun Wharf, Chatham.

For most of its history since the local government reforms instituted by the Local Government Act 1972, Kent County Council was under Conservative Party control until the latest election. At the most recent county council election in 2025, Reform UK won the election with 57 seats. Also elected were twelve Liberal Democrats, five from the Conservatives, five from the Green Party and two from the Labour Party.

Of Kent's thirteen districts, two are under Conservative control (Sevenoaks, Dartford), four are under Labour control (Gravesham, Medway, Thanet, Dover), one is under Liberal Democrat control (Tunbridge Wells), and six are under no overall control and are administered by coalitions (Tonbridge and Malling, Maidstone, Swale, Ashford, Canterbury, Folkestone and Hythe). Notably, Thanet is the only council in the United Kingdom to have come under UK Independence Party (UKIP) control, which it did in 2015.

=== Future ===
In July 2026, the Government of the United Kingdom announced its intention to reorganise Kent into four unitary authority areas by April 2028. North Kent will combine the area of Dartford, Gravesham and Medway; East Kent will combine Canterbury, Dover, and Thanet; Mid Kent will combine Ashford, Folkestone and Hythe, and Swale; and West Kent will combine Maidstone, Sevenoaks, Tonbridge and Malling, and Tunbridge Wells.

=== National representation ===
At the national level, Kent is represented in the House of Commons by eighteen Members of Parliament (MPs). The county has historically been dominated by the Conservative Party at general elections. Prior to 2024, the party had won a majority of Kentish seats in every election since the local government reforms of 1974, including during Labour's landslide victories of 1997 and 2001. In both 2010 and 2015, the Conservatives won every seat in the county. The 2024 election saw a sharp decline in support for the Conservatives, and the county is currently represented by eleven Labour MPs, six Conservatives and one Liberal Democrat.

General Election 2015: Kent
Party	Conservative	UKIP	Labour	Lib Dem	Green	Others	Turnout
Votes	422,119 (49.2%)	174,476 (20.3%)	171,990 (20.0%)	54,151 (6.3%)	31,069 (3.6%)	4,221 (0.5%)	858,026
Seats	17	0	0	0	0	0	

General Election 2017: Kent
Party	Conservative	Labour	Lib Dem	UKIP	Green	Others	Turnout
Votes	503,068 (56.4%) ▲80,949	282,296 (31.7%) ▲110,306	49,153 (5.5%) ▼4,998	31,732 (3.6%) ▼142,744	19,469 (2.2%) ▼11,600	5,818 (0.7%)	891,536 ▲33,510
Seats	16 ▼1	1 ▲1	0	0	0	0	

General Election 2019: Kent
Party	Conservative	Labour	Lib Dem	Green	Others	Turnout
Votes	532,342 (60.1%) ▲29,274	221,554 (25.0%) ▼60,742	91,974 (10.4%) ▲42,821	28,264 (3.2%) ▲8,795	11,063 (1.2%)	885,197 ▼6,339
Seats	16	1	0	0	0	

General Election 2024: Kent
Party	Conservative	Labour	Reform	Lib Dem	Green	Others	Turnout
Votes	251,130 (30.3%) ▼281,212	249,069 (30.1%) ▲27,515	168,652 (20.4%); New party	81,309 (9.8%) ▼10,665	64,303 (7.8%) ▲36,039	13,147 (1.6%)	827,610 ▼57,587
Seats	6 ▼10	11 ▲10	0	1 ▲1	0	0	

== Demography ==
=== Ethnic groups ===
The following table shows ethnic groups for the ceremonial county of Kent (comprising the Kent County Council and Medway unitary authority area).

Ethnic groups in Kent (ceremonial county)
Ethnic group	2001		2011		2021	
Ethnic group	Number	%	Number	%	Number	%
White	1,524,249	96.5%	1,607,681	93.1%	1,644,753	88.6%
Mixed / Multiple ethnic groups	13,796	0.9%	27,283	1.6%	44,625	2.4%
Asian / Asian British	26,215	1.7%	61,229	3.5%	86,423	4.7%
Black / Black British	6,463	0.4%	22,879	1.3%	56,759	3.1%
Other ethnic group	8,483	0.5%	8,593	0.5%	23,282	1.3%
Total	1,579,206	100%	1,727,665	100%	1,855,842	100%

Derived via aggregating the ONS (Nomis) census data for the Kent CC and Medway UA.

The five largest settlements in Kent/Medway unitary authority as of the 2021 UK census, as well as both settlements which have or had city status (Canterbury, Rochester). (Sources as accurate as possible to the locality's boundaries chosen, excluding surrounding towns or villages.) – red.
Four suburban settlements (most historically villages)/new town type settlements, currently undergoing significant planned expansion. – green.

At the 2011 census, Kent, including Medway, had 1,727,665 residents (18.0% of which in Medway); had 711,847 households (17.5% of which in Medway) and had 743,436 dwellings (14.8% of which in Medway). 51.1% of Kent's population excluding Medway was female—as to Medway, this proportion was 50.4%.

The tables below provide statistics for the administrative county of Kent, that is, excluding Medway.

Main household types
Married couples with/without children	Sole occupants	Unmarried couples with/without children	Lone parents	Shared homes and institutions
210,671	174,331 of which 79,310 over aged 65	63,750	60,645	77,877

Claimants of JSA or Income Support (DWP)
Unit	Claimants		Population (April 2011)
Unit	August 2012	August 2001	Population (April 2011)
Kent	55,100	89,470	1,463,740
% of 2011 Kent resident population (2001 population where applicable)	3.8%	6.7%	-
Three highest-ranking districts
Thanet	6.5%	11.3%	134,186
Folkestone and Hythe	4.9%	8.9%	107,969
Swale	4.8%	7.5%	135,835
Three lowest-ranking districts
Tonbridge and Malling	2.5%	4.4%	120,805
Sevenoaks	2.3%	4.3%	114,893
Tunbridge Wells	2.2%	5.1%	115,049

== Economy ==
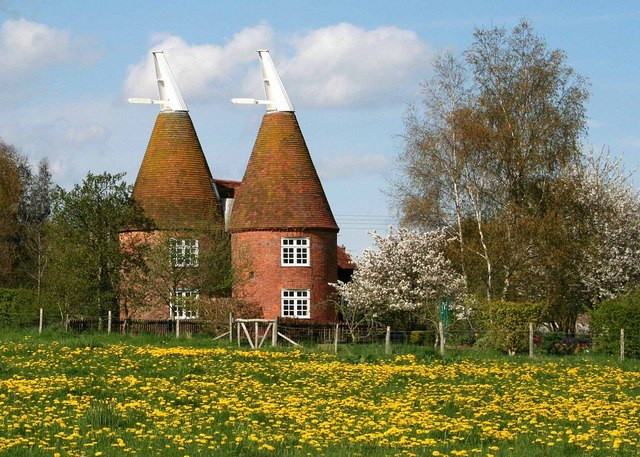
Converted oast houses at Frittenden

At the 2001 UK census, employment statistics for the residents in Kent, including Medway, were as follows: 41.1% in full-time employment, 12.4% in part-time employment, 9.1% self-employed, 2.9% unemployed, 2.3% students with jobs, 3.7% students without jobs, 12.3% retired, 7.3% looking after home or family, 4.3% permanently sick or disabled, and 2.7% economically inactive for other reasons. Of residents aged 16–74, 16% had a higher education qualification or the equivalent, compared to 20% nationwide.

The average hours worked per week by residents of Kent were 43.1 for males and 30.9 for females. Their industry of employment was 17.3% retail, 12.4% manufacturing, 11.8% real estate, 10.3% health and social work, 8.9% construction, 8.2% transport and communications, 7.9% education, 6.0% public administration and defence, 5.6% finance, 4.8% other community and personal service activities, 4.1% hotels and restaurants, 1.6% agriculture, 0.8% energy and water supply, 0.2% mining, and 0.1% private households. This is higher than the whole of England for construction and transport/communications and lower for manufacturing.

Kent is known as the "Garden of England" for its abundance of orchards and hop gardens. In particular the county produces tree-grown fruits, strawberries and hazelnuts. Distinctive hop-drying buildings called oasts are common in the countryside, although many have been converted into dwellings. Nearer to London, market gardens also flourish. Kent is the main area for hazelnut production in the UK.

However, in recent years, there has been a significant drop in agriculture, and industry and services are increasing their utilisation of the area. This is illustrated by the following table of economic indicator gross value added (GVA) between 1995 and 2003 (figures are in £ millions):

Year	Regional GVA^{[A]}	Agriculture		Industry^{[B]}		Services^{[C]}	
County of Kent (excluding Medway)
1995	12,369	379	3.1%	3,886	31.4%	8,104	65.5%
2000	15,259	259	1.7%	4,601	30.2%	10,399	68.1%
2003	18,126	287	1.6%	5,057	27.9%	12,783	70.5%
Medway
1995	1,823	21	3.1%	560	31.4%	1,243	68.2%
2000	2,348	8	1.7%	745	30.2%	1,595	67.9%
2003	2,671	10	1.6%	802	27.9%	1,859	69.6%

^{A} Components may not sum to totals due to rounding
^{B} includes energy and construction
^{C} includes financial intermediation services indirectly measured

North Kent is heavily industrialised, with cement-making at Northfleet and Cuxton, brickmaking at Sittingbourne, shipbuilding on the Medway and Swale, engineering and aircraft design and construction at Rochester, chemicals at Dartford, papermaking at Swanley, and oil refining at Grain. There is a steel mini mill in Sheerness and a rolling mill in Queenborough. There are two nuclear power stations at Dungeness, although the older one, Dungeness A, built in 1965, was decommissioned in 2006.

Cement-making, papermaking, and coal-mining were important industries in Kent during the 19th and 20th centuries. Cement came to the fore in the 19th century when massive building projects were undertaken. The ready supply of chalk and huge pits between Stone and Gravesend bear testament to that industry. There were also other workings around Burham on the tidal Medway. Chalk, gravel and clay were excavated on Dartford Heath for centuries.

Kent's original paper mills stood on streams like the River Darent, tributaries of the River Medway, and on the River Stour. Two 18th-century mills were on the River Len and at Tovil on the River Loose. In the late 19th century huge modern mills were built at Dartford and Northfleet on the River Thames and at Kemsley on The Swale. In pre-industrial times, almost every village and town had its own windmill or watermill, with over 400 windmills known to have stood at some time. Twenty-eight survive within the county today, plus two replica mills and a further two in that part of Kent now absorbed into London. All the major rivers in the county were used to power watermills.

From about 1900, several coal pits operated in East Kent. The Kent Coalfield was mined during the 20th century at several collieries, including Chislet, Tilmanstone, Betteshanger, and the Snowdown Colliery, which ran from 1908 to 1986.

The west of the county (including Tunbridge Wells, Tonbridge, and Sevenoaks) has less than 50% of the average claimant count for low incomes or worklessness as the coastal districts of Dover, Folkestone and Hythe, and Thanet (chiefly three resorts: Ramsgate, Broadstairs, and Margate). West and Central Kent have long had many City of London commuters.

According to Office for National Statistics figures in 2023, gross disposable household income per head in Kent was £25,273. This is slightly below the national figure for England as a whole at £25,424. GDHI measures the amount of money a person can choose to save or spend after accounting for taxes, social benefits, and other types of income distribution. In this view, the most affluent parts of Kent were Sevenoaks and Tunbridge Wells, each over £33,000, while the least affluent were Swale and Medway, both around £23,000. This is illustrated by the following table of demographic and economic indicators below:

Local Authority District	Population, 2023	Gross Disposable Household Income, 2023^{[A]}	GDHI per head, 2023^{[B]}
Ashford	138,283	3,552	£25,686
Canterbury	159,939	3,722	£23,271
Dartford	120,699	2,967	£24,581
Dover District	118,591	2,760	£23,273
Folkestone and Hythe	110,995	2,690	£24,235
Gravesham	107,737	2,607	£24,197
Maidstone	184,187	4,771	£25,903
Medway	286,800	6,618	£23,075
Sevenoaks	121,262	4,591	£37,860
Swale	155,893	3,584	£22,990
Thanet	140,439	3,244	£23,099
Tonbridge and Malling	135,206	3,824	£28,282
Tunbridge Wells	117,020	3,906	£33,378
Kent, total	1,897,051	48,836	£25,273
England, total	57,690,323	1,466,752	£25,424

^{A} Figure in millions of £	^{B} Figures rounded to nearest £

== Culture ==
=== Architecture ===
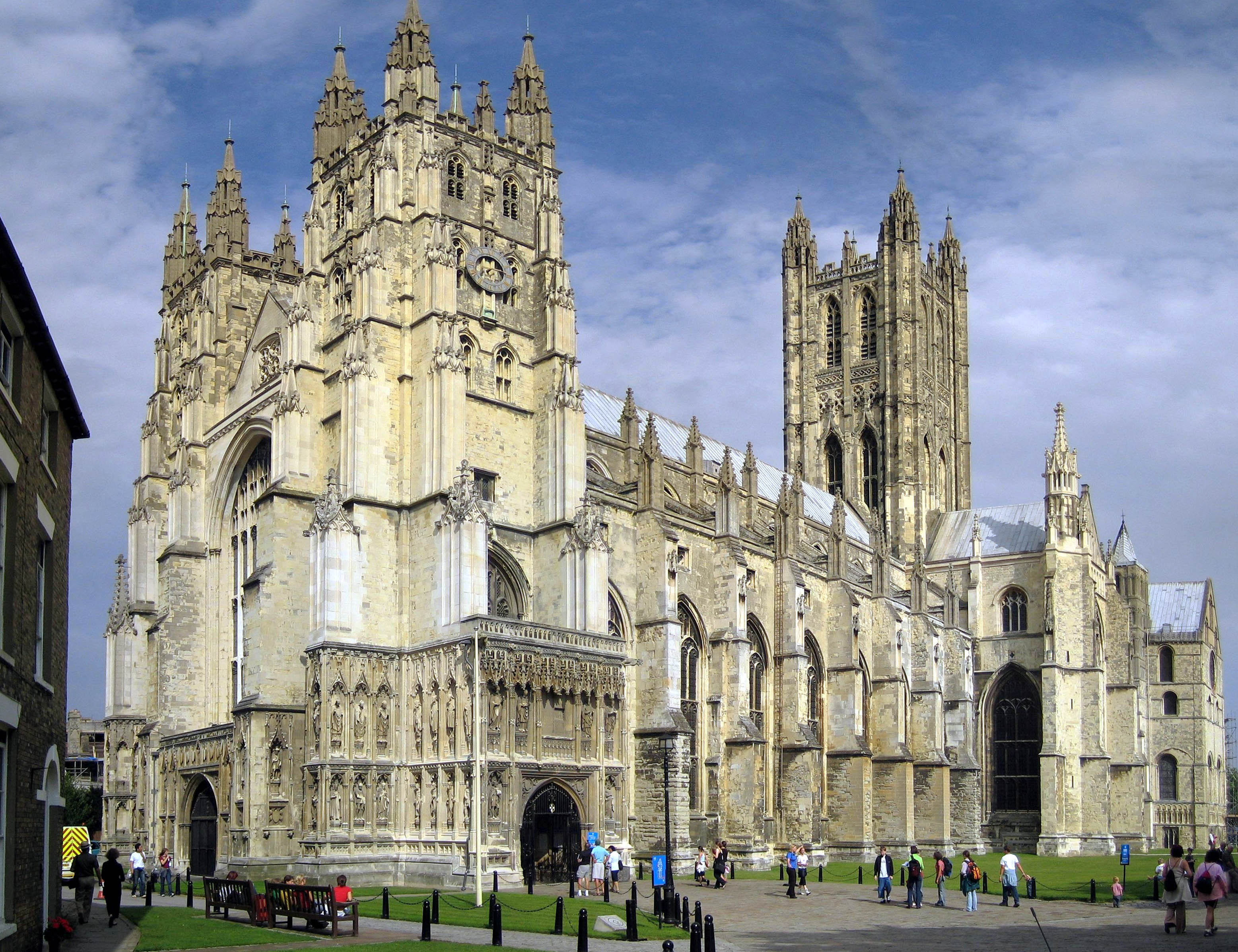
Canterbury Cathedral

Kent's geographical location between the Straits of Dover and London has influenced its architecture, as has its Cretaceous geology and its good farming land and fine building clays. Kent's countryside pattern was determined by a gavelkind inheritance system that generated a proliferation of small settlements. There was no open-field system, and the large tracts were owned by the two great abbeys, Christ Church, Canterbury and St Augustine's Abbey, that did not pass into the hands of the king during the Reformation. Canterbury Cathedral is the United Kingdom's metropolitan cathedral; it was founded in AD 598 and displays architecture from all periods. There are nine Anglo-Saxon churches in Kent. Rochester Cathedral is England's second-oldest cathedral, the present building built in the Early English Style.

The sites of Richborough Castle and Dover Castle, along with two strategic sites along Watling Street, were fortified by the Romans and the Dukes of Kent. Other important sites include Canterbury city walls and Rochester Castle. Deal Castle, Walmer Castle, Sandown Castle (whose remains were eroded by the sea in the 1990s) were constructed in late mediaeval times, and HM Dockyard, at Chatham and its surrounding castles and forts—Upnor Castle, Great Lines, and Fort Amherst since then.

Kent has three unique vernacular architecture forms: the oast house, the Wealden hall house, and Kentish peg-tiles.

Kent has bridge trusts to maintain its bridges. The great bridge (1387) at Rochester was replaced. There are medieval structures at Aylesford, Yalding and Teston. With the motorways in the late twentieth century came the M2 motorway bridge spanning the Medway and the Dartford tunnel and the Dartford Bridge spanning the Thames.

=== Literature and publishing ===
Kent has provided inspiration for several notable writers and artists. It has been suggested that Kent inspired many settings in Shakespeare's plays, and he described it in the line 'Sweet is the country, and is full of riches / The people liberal, active, valiant, worthy.' Canterbury's religious role gave rise to Chaucer's Canterbury Tales, a key development in the English language. The father of novelist Charles Dickens worked at the Chatham Dockyard; in many of his books, the celebrated novelist featured the scenery of Chatham, Rochester, and the Cliffe marshes. During the late 1930s, Nobel Prize-awarded novelist William Golding worked as a teacher at Maidstone Grammar School, where he met his future wife Ann Brookfield.

William Caxton, who first introduced the printing press to England, was born in Kent; the recent invention was key in helping many Kent dialect words and spellings to become standard in English. Lord Northbourne hosted a biodynamic agriculture conference on his estate at Betteshanger in the summer of 1939, he coined the term 'organic farming' and published his manifesto of organic agriculture the following year spawning a global movement for sustainable agriculture and food.

=== Classical music ===
Many notable musicians have been associated with Kent. Walter Galpin Alcock, composer and organist, who played the organ at the coronations of Edward VII, George V and George VI, was born at Edenbridge in 1861. Richard Rodney Bennett, composer and pianist, was born at Broadstairs in 1936. Alfred Deller, counter-tenor singer, was born at Margate in 1912. Orlando Gibbons, composer and organist, died in Canterbury on 5 June 1625 and is buried in the cathedral. George Frideric Handel took the waters at Royal Tunbridge Wells in 1734 and 1735. Wolfgang Amadeus Mozart, together with his father, mother and sister, stayed at Bourne Park House near Canterbury, 25–30 July 1765. The nights of 24 and 30 July were spent in Canterbury, where they also went to the horse races. Nikolai Rimsky-Korsakov, then an 18-year-old sea cadet, was anchored at Gravesend from November 1862 to February 1863; while there, he completed the slow movement of his First Symphony. Malcolm Sargent, conductor, was born at Ashford in 1895. Thomas Tallis, composer and organist, was a lay clerk of Canterbury Cathedral around 1541–2. Peter Warlock, composer and writer on music, and Ernest John Moeran, composer, resided at Eynsford from 1925 to 1928; Arnold Bax, William Walton and Constant Lambert visited them here. Percy Whitlock, organist and composer, was born at Chatham in 1903.

=== Visual arts ===
A number of significant artists came from Kent, including Thomas Sidney Cooper, a painter of landscapes, often incorporating farm animals, Richard Dadd, a maker of faery paintings, and Mary Tourtel, the creator of the children's book character, Rupert Bear. The artist Clive Head was also born in Kent. The landscape painter J. M. W. Turner spent part of his childhood in the town of Margate in East Kent, and regularly returned to visit it throughout his life. The East Kent coast inspired many of his works, including some of his most famous seascapes. Kent has also been the home to artists including Frank Auerbach, Tracey Emin and Stass Paraskos.

Kent was also the location of the largest number of art schools in the country during the nineteenth century, estimated by the art historian David Haste, to approach two hundred. This is believed to be the result of Kent being a front line county during the Napoleonic Wars. At this time, before the invention of photography, draughtsmen were used to draw maps and topographical representations of the fields of battle, and after the wars ended many of these settled permanently in the county in which they had been based. Once the idea of art schools had been established, even in small towns in Kent, the tradition continued, although most of the schools were very small one-man operations, each teaching a small number of daughters of the upper classes how to draw and make watercolour paintings. Nonetheless, some of these small art schools developed into much larger organisations, including Canterbury College of Art, founded by Thomas Sidney Cooper in 1868, which is today the University for the Creative Arts.

Blean near Canterbury was home to Smallfilms, the production company founded by Oliver Postgate and Peter Firmin and responsible for children's TV favourites Noggin the Nog, Ivor the Engine and Bagpuss. Filmmaker Derek Jarman maintained a home, Prospect Cottage, on the coast in Dungeness from 1987 until his death in 1994; Creative Folkestone now serves as its custodians.

=== Performing arts ===
The county's largest theatre is the Marlowe Theatre in the centre of Canterbury.

Music festivals that take place in Kent include Chilled in a Field Festival, Electric Gardens, Hop Farm Festival, In the Woods Festival, Lounge On The Farm and the annual Smugglers Festival near Deal. Other venues for live music include Leas Cliff Hall in Folkestone and the Assembly Hall in Tunbridge Wells.

== Transport ==
=== Roads ===
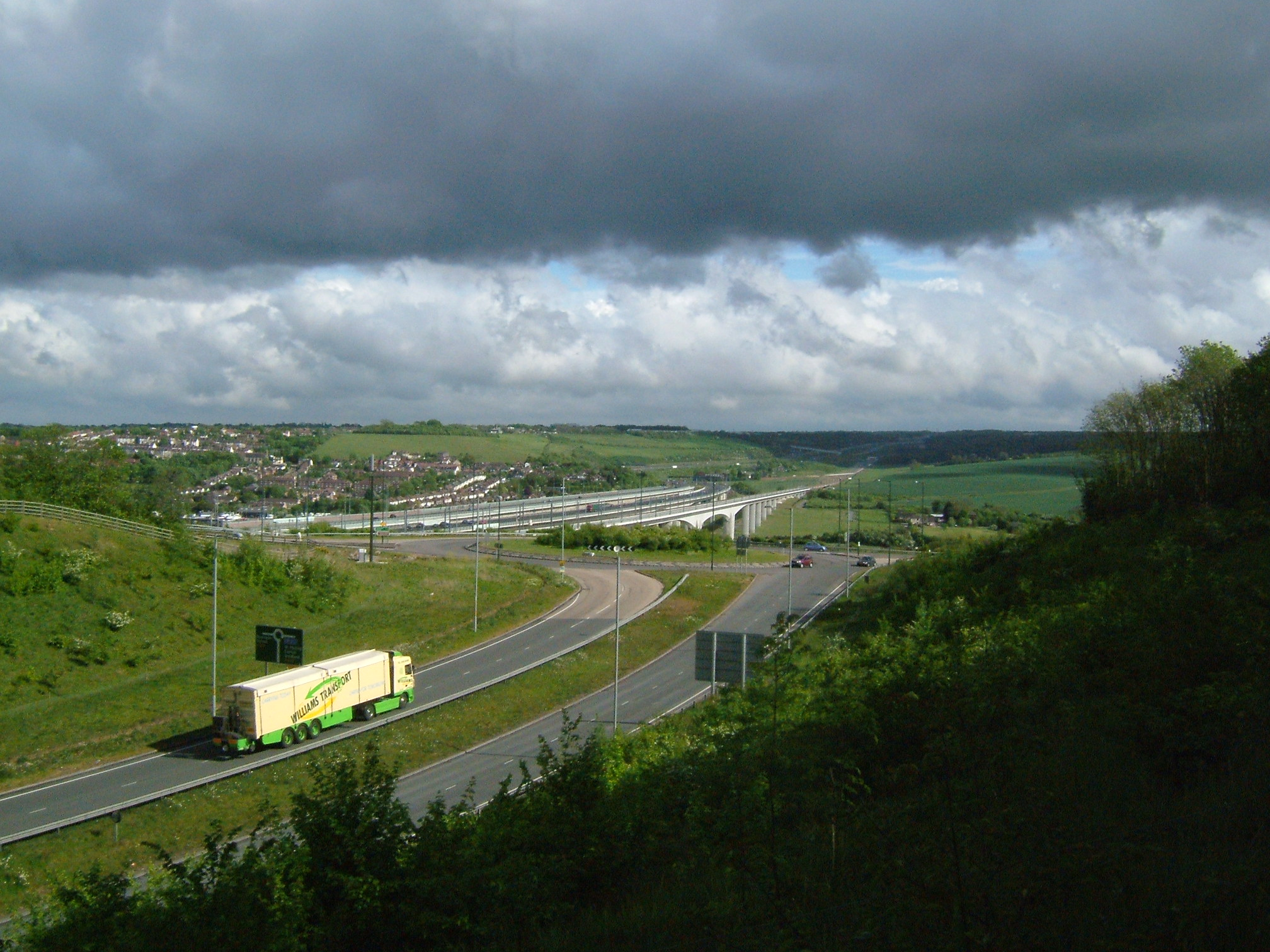
The M2 and High Speed 1 crossing the Medway Valley, south of Rochester

With the Roman invasion, a road network was constructed to connect London to the Channel ports of Dover, Lympne and Richborough. The London–Dover road was Watling Street. These roads are now approximately the A2, B2068, A257, and the A28. The A2 runs through Dartford (A207), Gravesend, Rochester, Canterbury, and Dover; the A20 through Eltham, Wrotham, Maidstone, Charing, Ashford. Hythe, Folkestone and Dover; the A21 around Sevenoaks, Tonbridge, Tunbridge Wells and on to Hastings in East Sussex.

In the 1960s, two motorways were built; the M2 from Medway to Faversham, and the M20 from Swanley to Folkestone. Part of the M25 runs through Kent, from Westerham to the Dartford Crossing. The M26 motorway, built in 1980, provides a short link between the M25 at Sevenoaks and the M20 near Wrotham. Kent currently has more motorways by distance than any other county in the UK, with sections of the M2, M20, M25 and M26 totalling 173 km (107 mi) within the extents of the ceremonial county.

In the run-up to Britain leaving the European Union, Government minister Michael Gove confirmed that the Government intended to impose a de facto border between Kent and the rest of England for freight lorries, in order to deal with expected lorry queues of 7,000 or more at Folkestone, Dover and other ports. Heavy goods vehicle operators need to apply for a 24-hour Kent Access Permit (KAP) to take a vehicle of 7.5 tonnes or more into Kent if their intention is to cross to the EU via Dover or the Eurotunnel.

=== Water ===
The medieval Cinque Ports, except for the Port of Dover, have all now silted up. The Medway Estuary has been an important port and naval base for 500 years. The River Medway is tidal up to Allington and navigable up to Tonbridge. Kent's two canals are the Royal Military Canal between Hythe and Rye, which still exists, and the Thames and Medway Canal between Strood and Gravesend. Built-in 1824, it was purchased in 1846 by the railways, which partially backfilled it. Container ports are at Ramsgate and Thamesport. Following the closures across the lower Medway, and the Swale to the Isle of Sheppey, during the 20th century, the Woolwich Ferry is the only domestic ferry that runs in the broadest definition of the county.

=== Railways ===
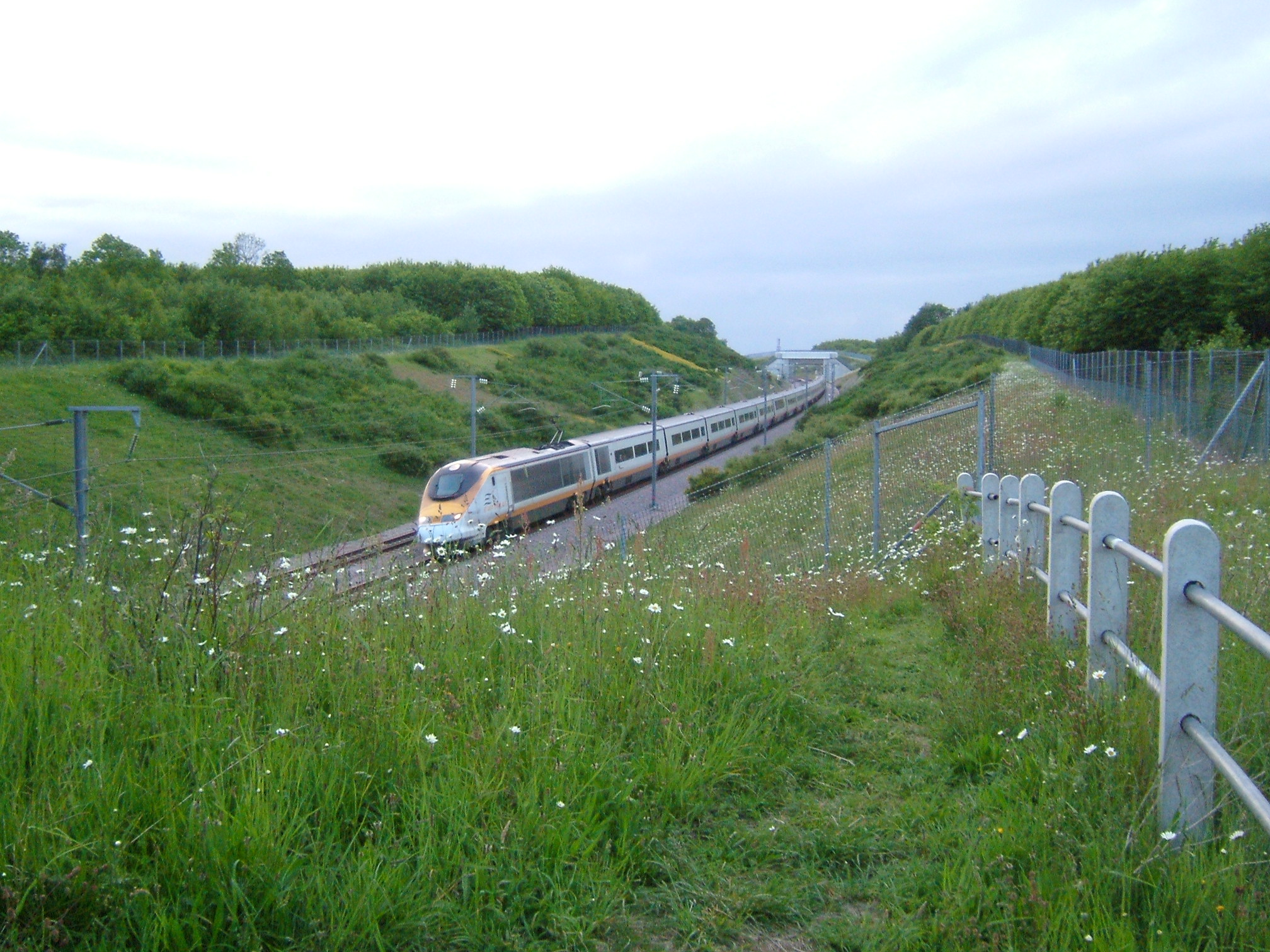
A 300 km/h (186 mph) Eurostar train at km 48 (mile 30) on High Speed 1, near Strood

The earliest locomotive-driven passenger-carrying railway in Britain was the Canterbury & Whitstable Railway which opened in 1830. This and the London & Greenwich Railway later merged into South Eastern Railway (SER). By the 1850s, SER's networks had expanded to Ashford, Ramsgate, Canterbury, Tunbridge Wells, and the Medway towns. SER's major London termini were London Bridge, Charing Cross, and Cannon Street. Kent also had a second major railway, the London, Chatham & Dover Railway. Originally the East Kent Railway in 1858, it linked the northeast Kent coast with London terminals at Victoria and Blackfriars.

The two companies merged in 1899, forming the South Eastern & Chatham Railway, further amalgamated with other railways by the Railways Act 1921 to form the Southern Railway. Britain's railways were nationalised in 1948, forming British Railways. The railways were privatised in 1996 and most Kent passenger services were franchised to Connex South Eastern. Following financial difficulties, Connex lost the franchise and was replaced by South Eastern Trains and after Southeastern.

The Channel Tunnel was completed in 1994 and High Speed 1 in November 2007 with a London terminus at St Pancras. A new station, Ebbsfleet International, opened between Dartford and Gravesend, serving northern Kent. The high speed lines will be utilised to provide a faster train service to coastal towns like Ramsgate and Folkestone. This station is in addition to the existing station at Ashford International, which has suffered a massive cut in service as a result.

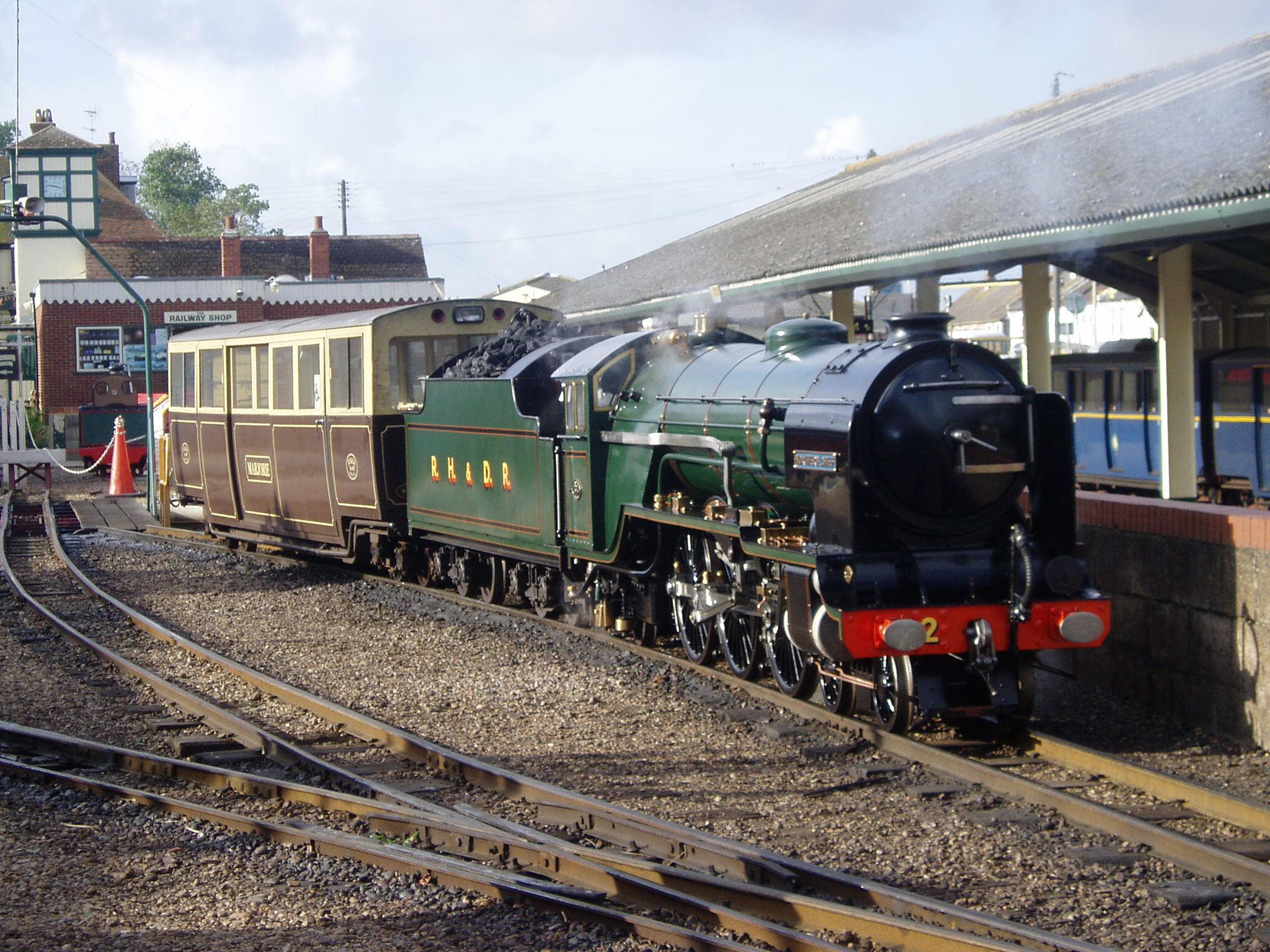
Romney, Hythe & Dymchurch Railway

In addition to the "main line" railways, there are several light, heritage, and industrial railways in Kent. There are three heritage, standard gauge railways; Spa Valley Railway near Tunbridge Wells on the old Tunbridge Wells West branch, East Kent Railway on the old East Kent coalfield area and the Kent & East Sussex Railway on the Weald around Tenterden. In addition, there is the 15-inch (380 mm) gauge, Romney, Hythe & Dymchurch Railway on the southeast Kent coast along the Dungeness peninsula. Finally, there is the 2 ft 6 in (0.76 m), industrial Sittingbourne & Kemsley Light Railway, previously the Bowaters Paper Railway.

=== Air ===
Charter flights are provided at Lydd Airport at Lydd.

In 2002, it was revealed that the government was considering building a new four-runway airport on the marshland near the village of Cliffe on Hoo Peninsula. This plan was dropped in 2003 following protests by cultural and environmental groups. However further plans for a Thames Estuary Airport on the Kent coast have subsequently emerged, including the Thames Hub Airport, again sited on the Isle of Grain and designed by Lord Foster, and the London Britannia Airport plan, colloquially known as "Boris Island" due to its being championed by the former Mayor of London Boris Johnson, which would see a six-runway airport built on an artificial island to be towards the Shivering Sands area, northeast of Whitstable. Both of these options were dropped in 2014 in favour of expansion at either Gatwick or Heathrow Airport, the latter finally being the chosen option following Theresa May's installation as Prime Minister in summer 2016.

Manston Airport, located near the village of Manston in the Thanet district, was a former RAF facility that also handled some civilian flights. It closed in 2014.

== Education ==
Kent has four universities: Canterbury Christ Church University with campuses throughout East Kent; University of Kent, with campuses in Canterbury and Medway; University of Greenwich (a London University), with sites at Woolwich, Eltham, London and Medway; the University for the Creative Arts (UCA) also has three of its five campuses in the county.

Although much of Britain adopted a comprehensive education system in the 1970s, Kent County Council (KCC) and Medway Unitary Authority are among around fifteen local authorities still providing wholly selective education through the eleven-plus examination with students allocated a place at a secondary modern school or at a grammar school.

Together, the two Kent authorities have 38 of the 164 grammar schools remaining in Britain.

Kent County Council has the largest education department of any local council in Britain, providing school places for over 289,000 pupils.

In 2005–06, Kent County Council and Medway introduced a standardised school year, based on six terms, as recommended by the Local Government Association in its 2000 report, "The Rhythms of Schooling".

Kent County Council Local Education Authority maintains 96 secondary schools, of which 33 are selective schools and 63 are secondary modern schools.

Schools in Kent (data from 2000)
LEA	Nursery	Primary	Secondary (modern)	Secondary (grammar)	Special	Pupil Referral Units	Independent	City Technology College	Total
KCC	1	475	74	32	34	11	83	1	711
Medway	0	89	14	6	3	1	7	0	120

Music education is provided by Kent Music (formerly Kent Music School), which has its origins in the 1940s. Kent Music provides services across the county including Kent County Youth Orchestra, Kent Youth Choirs, and an annual summer school at Benenden School.

=== National Challenge schools ===
In 2010, Kent had the highest number of National Challenge schools in England: schools which are branded 'failing' based on the British Government's floor targets that 30% of pupils achieve at least 5 GCSE grades A* to C. Of the 63 secondary modern schools, 33 missed this target; thus 52% of Kent secondary modern schools (34% out of all 96 maintained secondary schools) are 'failing'.

== Sport ==
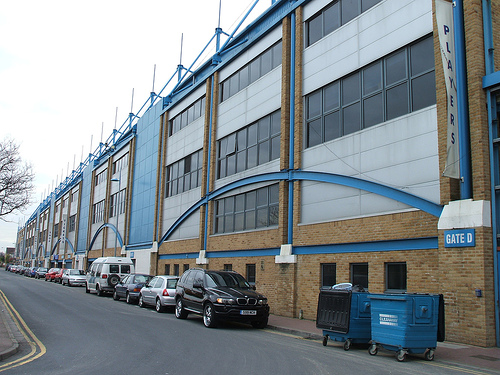
Priestfield Stadium is the home of Gillingham FC, Kent's only Football League team.

In association football, Kent's highest ranked football team is Gillingham FC (nicknamed 'The Gills') who play in Football League Two, having been demoted at the end of the 2021–22 season. Maidstone United was a Football League side from 1989 until going bankrupt in 1992. Kent clubs in the higher levels of non-league football include Ebbsfleet United, who were promoted in 2023. Tonbridge Angels and the current incarnation of Maidstone United currently play in National League South, the sixth tier of the English football pyramid.

Kent is represented in cricket by Kent County Cricket Club. The club was a founder member of the County Championship in 1890 and has won the competition, the major domestic first-class cricket competition, seven times. The club is based at the St Lawrence Ground in Canterbury and also plays matches at the Nevill Ground in Royal Tunbridge Wells and the County Cricket Ground, Beckenham. The Kent Women cricket team has won the Women's County Championship seven times since it was established in 1997. Cricket has traditionally been a popular sport in the county and Kent is considered one of the locations in which the game first developed. Teams have represented the county since the early 18th century. The Kent Cricket League is the top level of club competition within Kent and features teams from throughout the county, including areas such as Beckenham and Bexley which were formerly part of the county.

Canterbury Hockey Club and Holcombe Hockey Club have historically competed at the highest levels of English field hockey, with Holcombe's men's and women's first teams currently playing in the England Hockey Premier Divisions. Sevenoaks Hockey Club's women's first XI competes in Division 1 South, the second tier of the national league structure.

The Invicta Dynamos, based in Gillingham, are a semi-professional ice hockey team that plays in the National Ice Hockey League. They replaced the Medway Bears as the senior team in 1997. They share the home ice rink at Planet Ice Gillingham with the secondary senior team, Invicta Mustangss, and the ladies' ice hockey team, the Invicta Dynamics.

In rugby union, Tonbridge Juddians and Canterbury RFC play in the fourth tier of English rugby in the National League 2 East and similar level. Gravesend RFC play in the seventh-tier London 2 South-East (Regional 2 South East). Blackheath RFC, a club within the historic boundaries of the county, played in the third tier (National league 1) until being relegated at the end of the 2021–22 season.

The Brands Hatch circuit near Swanley has played host to a number of national and international racing events and hosted 12 runnings of the British Grand Prix between 1964 and 1986.

There have been multiple American football teams based in Kent since the game was popularised in the UK. Currently, Canterbury is the home of the East Kent Mavericks, the 2023 BAFA National Leagues Southern Football Conference 2 Champions, as well as teams from both universities.

Kent is home to two national-league netball clubs, both based in northwest Kent: Telstars (Premier Division 2) and KCNC (Premier Division 3).

In basketball, the Kent Panthers participate in Division 3 of the National Basketball League.

The 2021–2022 season saw three Kentish clubs demoted from the third tier of their respective sports to the fourth tier, with rugby clubs Tonbridge Juddians and Blackheath RFC being relegated in rugby and Gillingham F.C. being relegated in football.

== News and media ==
=== Television ===
Kent is served by the BBC's South East region, which is based in Tunbridge Wells and provides local news for the county and East Sussex. Its commercial rival is ITV Meridian Ltd, which has a newsroom at The Maidstone Studios despite the main studio being based in Hampshire. Main transmitters providing these services are at West Hougham, near Dover and Blue Bell Hill, between Chatham and Maidstone. A powerful relay transmitter at Tunbridge Wells serves the town and surrounding area. Those parts of Kent closest to London such as Swanley, Westerham, Dartford, Gravesend, and Sevenoaks lie within the ITV London and BBC London areas, taking their television signals from the Crystal Palace transmitter.

=== Radio ===
Kent has two county-wide stations – BBC Radio Kent, based in Tunbridge Wells; and the commercial station KMFM, owned by the KM Group. KMFM previously consisted of seven local stations which covered different areas of the county (and are still technically seven different licences) but have shared all programming since 2012

The county's first commercial station was originally known as Invicta (Invicta Sound/Invicta FM) and began broadcasting on 1 October 1984. After various buy-outs it was rebranded as Heart Kent in June 2009 as part of Global's Heart network roll-out, and in 2019 the station was merged with neighbouring Heart licences to form Heart South; Heart Kent's Whitstable studios closed in late May 2019 with regional production consolidated elsewhere (the merged regional service broadcasts from Fareham).

There are several community radio stations in Kent including:

- Academy FM (Folkestone).
- Academy FM (Thanet)
- Ashford FM (Ashford) on 107.1 FM.
- BRFM 95.6 FM (Sheppey)
- Cabin FM broadcasting to Herne Bay on 94.6FM.
- Cinque Ports Radio 100.2FM for Romney Marsh, Rye and Hythe.
- CSR 97.4FM (Canterbury) now only available via online listening.
- Deal Radio (Deal): online only.
- Dover Community Radio (DCR) Dover: currently online only; due to start broadcasting to Dover District on 104.9FM from May 2022.
- Radio Faversham (Faversham): online only.
- Maidstone Community Radio (MCR): online only.
- Miskin Radio (Dartford and Gravesend): online only.
- SFM 106.9FM (Sittingboune)
- Sheppey FM 92.2 (Sheppey)
- Shoreline Easy (Romney Marsh), online only.
- West Kent Radio (WKCR) serving Tonbridge, Tunbridge Wells and Sevenoaks. 95.5 and 106.7FM.
- Whitstable Bay Radio (Whitstable): online only.

=== Newspapers ===
The KM Group, KOS Media and Kent Regional News and Media all provide local newspapers for most of the large towns and cities. County-wide papers include the Kent Messenger, Kent on Saturday, Kent on Sunday, and the Kent and Sussex Courier.

== See also ==
- Custos Rotulorum of Kent – list of Keepers of the Rolls
- Duke of Kent
- Kent (UK Parliament constituency) – historical list of MPs for Kent constituency
- Kent Community Network
- Kent Police and Crime Commissioner
- List of churches in Kent
- List of English and Welsh endowed schools (19th century) § Kent
- List of civil parishes in Kent
- List of fire stations in Kent
- List of hills of Kent
- List of Lord Lieutenants of Kent
- Listed buildings in Kent
- List of people from Kent
- List of places in Kent
- List of tourist attractions in Kent
- Recreational walks in Kent
- Thames Gateway – includes details of regeneration projects in the northern areas of Kent
- Category:Towns in Kent
- Category:Villages in Kent
- Fergus and Judith Wilson
