= Invicta Mustangs =

Ice hockey team in Kent, England

- City: Gillingham, Kent
- League: NIHL 2 South (Wilkinson)
- Founded: 1998
- Home arena: Planet Ice, Gillingham; Capacity: 1,200
- Colours: White, Blue & Red
- Head coach: Ali Rodger
- Captain: Kevin Lake
- Affiliates: Invicta Dynamos
- Website: Invicta Mustangs

The Invicta Mustangs are an ice hockey team in Gillingham in Kent, England. They compete in the South 2 (Wilkinson) division of the National Ice Hockey League.

The Mustangs are a senior team, with players signed to seasonal contracts.

== Club roster 2022–23 ==
Netminders
No.	Nat.	Player	Age	Catches	Last season
50	(United Kingdom)	Lucy Gruber	24	Left	Invicta Mustangs
54	(United Kingdom)	Keiran Wyatt	22	Left	Invicta Mustangs

Defencemen
No.	Nat.	Player	Age	Shoots	Last Season
4	(United Kingdom)	Aaron Ferris	26	Right	Invicta Mustangs
16	(United Kingdom)	Jarvis Mewett	26	Right	Invicta Mustangs
20	(United Kingdom)	Tom Dennis	32	Right	Invicta Mustangs
37	(United Kingdom)	Joe Gibson	20	Left	Streatham Hawks
42	(United Kingdom)	Michael Stokes	31	Right	Invicta Mustangs
44	(United Kingdom)	Matthew Bell	18	Right	Invicta Mustangs
71	(United Kingdom)	Regan O'Neil - A	23	Right	Invicta Mustangs
84	(United Kingdom)	Sam Oliver	20	Right	Invicta Mustangs

Forwards
No.	Nat.	Player	Age	Shoots	Last Season
3	(United Kingdom)	Ed Stedman	18	Right	Invicta Mustangs
9	(United Kingdom)	Wes Jackson	33	Left	Invicta Mustangs
10	(United Kingdom)	Joe Bliss	29	Right	Invicta Mustangs
11	(United Kingdom)	Kevin Lake - C	47	Right	Invicta Mustangs
12	(United Kingdom)	Tom Mallett	29	Right	Invicta Mustangs
17	(United Kingdom)	Jake Stedman - A	23	Right	Invicta Mustangs
19	(United Kingdom)	Luke Thirkettle	23	Right	Invicta Dynamos
46	(United Kingdom)	Brad Gutridge	36	Right	Invicta Mustangs
48	(United Kingdom)	James Laming	23	Right	Invicta Mustangs
57	(United Kingdom)	Anthony Baskerville	33	Right	Invicta Mustangs
95	(United Kingdom)	Jack Rowland	27	Right	Invicta Mustangs
96	(United Kingdom)	Kwame Holt	28	Left	Invicta Mustangs

== Statistical records ==
=== Top ten appearances ===
League, cup & play-offs; as at end of 2021/22 season

Players in bold are still active with the club.

Player
No.	Nat.	Player	Number of seasons	Appearances
1	(United Kingdom)	**Michael Stokes** (D)	12	232
2	(United Kingdom)	**Bradley Gutridge** (C)	10	189
3	(United Kingdom)	**Kevin Lake** (C)	10	185
4	(United Kingdom)	**Tom Dennis** (D)	10	175
5	(United Kingdom)	**Tom Mallett** (C/RW)	9	175
6	(United Kingdom)	Jake Luton (LW)	8	156
7	(United Kingdom)	Richard Smith (F)	8	149
8	(United Kingdom)	**Aaron Ferris** (D/LW)	8	136
9	(United Kingdom)	Matthew Drake (F)	7	131
10	(United Kingdom)	**Anthony Baskerville** (LW)	6	116

=== Top ten points scorers ===
League, cup & play-offs; as at end of 2021/22 season

Players in bold are still active with the club.

Player
No.	Nat.	Player	Number of games played	Points
1	(United Kingdom)	**Kevin Lake** (C)	185	334
2	(United Kingdom)	Jake Luton (LW)	156	174
3	(United Kingdom)	**Michael Stokes** (D)	232	153
4	(United Kingdom)	**Tom Dennis** (D)	175	144
5	(United Kingdom)	Matthew Drake (F)	131	133
6	(United Kingdom)	Daniel Fudger (F)	65	124
7	(United Kingdom)	**Bradley Gutridge** (C)	189	107
8	(United Kingdom)	**Joe Bliss** (LW)	50	82
9	(United Kingdom)	Richard Smith (F)	149	82
10	(United Kingdom)	Peter Beerling (D)	83	81

=== Top ten goal scorers ===
League, cup & play-offs; as at end of 2021/22 season

Players in bold are still active with the club.

Player
No.	Nat.	Player	Number of games played	Goals scored
1	(United Kingdom)	**Kevin Lake** (C)	185	122
2	(United Kingdom)	Jake Luton (LW)	156	96
3	(United Kingdom)	Matthew Drake (F)	131	68
4	(United Kingdom)	Daniel Fudger (F)	65	61
5	(United Kingdom)	**Bradley Gutridge** (C)	189	50
6	(United Kingdom)	**Michael Stokes** (D)	232	47
7	(United Kingdom)	**Joe Bliss** (LW)	50	47
8	(United Kingdom)	**Jake Stedman** (C/RW)	88	45
9	(United Kingdom)	**Tom Dennis** (D)	175	40
10	(United Kingdom)	Richard Harris (LW)	53	40

=== Top ten assists ===
League, cup & play-offs; as at end of 2021/22 season

Players in bold are still active with the club.

Player
No.	Nat.	Player	Number of games played	Assists
1	(United Kingdom)	**Kevin Lake** (C)	185	212
2	(United Kingdom)	**Micheal Stokes** (D)	232	106
3	(United Kingdom)	**Tom Dennis** (D)	175	104
4	(United Kingdom)	Jake Luton (LW)	156	78
5	(United Kingdom)	Matthew Drake (F)	131	65
6	(United Kingdom)	Daniel Fudger (F)	65	63
7	(United Kingdom)	**Bradley Gutridge** (C)	189	57
8	(United Kingdom)	Peter Beerling (D)	83	57
9	(United Kingdom)	Richard Smith (F)	149	51
10	(United Kingdom)	James Fraser (F)	74	44

=== Top ten penalty minutes ===
League, cup & play-offs; as at end of 2021/22 season

Players in bold are still active with the club.

Player
No.	Nat.	Player	Number of games played	PIM
1	(United Kingdom)	**Bradley Gutridge** (C)	189	570
2	(United Kingdom)	**Aaron Ferris** (D/LW)	136	460
3	(United Kingdom)	**Tom Dennis** (D)	175	447
4	(United Kingdom)	Richard Smith (F)	149	421
5	(United Kingdom)	**Kevin Lake** (C)	185	361
6	(United Kingdom)	**Michael Stokes** (D)	232	344
7	(United Kingdom)	**Jake Stedman** (C/RW)	88	306
8	(United Kingdom)	Matthew Drake (F)	131	301
9	(United Kingdom)	**Regan O'Neil** (D)	82	271
10	(United Kingdom)	Joshua Carle (D)	87	252

=== Top ten points per game ===
League, cup & play-offs; as at end of 2021/22 season (players with under 20 appearances not included)

Players in bold are still active with the club.

Player
No.	Nat.	Player	Number of games played	PPG
1	(United Kingdom)	Daniel Clayton (F)	22	1.86
2	(United Kingdom)	**Kevin Lake** (C)	185	1.81
3	(United Kingdom)	**Joe Bliss** (LW)	50	1.64
4	(United Kingdom)	Jamie Smith (F)	39	1.49
5	(United Kingdom)	Peter Carey (F)	43	1.37
6	(United Kingdom)	Laurence Billing (F)	33	1.24
7	(United Kingdom)	Jake Luton (LW)	156	1.12
8	(United Kingdom)	James Fraser (F)	74	1.05
9	(United Kingdom)	Martin Rider (F)	23	1.04
10	(United Kingdom)	Matthew Drake (F)	131	1.02

== Season-by-season record ==
Invicta Mustangs season-by-season record

Season	League	GP	W	T	L	OTL	PTS	GF	GA	League position
2001–02	ENL	18	3	2	13	–	8	59	123	9th
2002–03	ENL	20	8	4	8	-	20	52	55	3rd
2008–09	ENL2	32	14	4	14	-	32	131	114	5th
2009–10	ENL2	20	14	2	4	-	30	148	51	4th
2010–11	ENL2	24	12	1	11	-	25	132	117	7th
2011–12	ENL2	24	5	3	16	-	13	61	115	12th
2012–13	NIHL2 South	22	9	3	10	-	21	130	110	7th
2013–14	NIHL2 South	22	3	2	17	-	8	64	133	12th
2014–15	NIHL2 South East	20	1	0	19	-	2	40	147	6th
2015–16	NIHL2 South East	18	1	1	16	-	3	33	179	6th
2016–17	NIHL2 South East	20	6	3	11	-	15	73	90	3rd
2017–18	NIHL2 South	26	7	–	18	1	15	75	161	12th
2018–19	NIHL2 South	28	8	–	19	1	17	89	152	11th
2019–20	NIHL2 South East	20	13	-	5	0	26	146	54	3rd
2021–22	NIHL2 South	22	16	-	5	1	33	117	63	5th

Note: GP = Games played; W = Wins; L = Losses; T = Ties; OTL = Overtime losses; PTS = Points; GF = Goals for; GA = Goals against

== Retired numbers ==
7 – in honour of Danny Terry

== Other ice hockey teams based in Gillingham ==
- Invicta Dynamics (ladies senior team)
- Invicta Dynamos (mens senior team)
- Invicta Colts (under 18's)
- Invicta Mavericks (under 16's)
- Invicta Chargers (under 14's)
- Invicta Stampede (under 12's)
- Invicta Buckeroos (under 10's)
- Invicta Knights (recreational)
- Medway Madness (recreational)
- Medway Eagles (beginner recreational)
- Medway Marauders (recreational)
