= Invicta Dynamos =

Ice hockey team in Kent, England

- City: Gillingham, Kent
- League: National Ice Hockey League
- Division: NIHL 1 South
- Founded: 1997
- Home arena: Planet Ice, Gillingham; Capacity: 1,200
- Colours: White, Blue & Grey
- Owners: Kevin & Sarah Parrish
- Head coach: Karl Lennon
- Captain: Jacob Ranson
- Website: Invicta Dynamos

The Invicta Dynamos are the senior, semi-professional, Ice Hockey team based in Gillingham in Kent. They were founded in 1997 and play their home games at Planet Ice, Gillingham, which they share with the Invicta Mustangs.

== History ==
The club was founded in 1997 by David Hodge replacing the Medway Bears as the senior team based at the Ice Bowl. The club originally competed in the EPIHL until the 2003/4 season when the club dropped down to the ENIHL due to a lack of sponsorship. Invicta is one of the larger clubs at this level and has enjoyed a period of sustained success including winning the ENIHL Grand Slam in 2005/6. The most successful season in the Dynamos history came in the 2001/02 season when they were the champions of the EPIHL, winning the league and playoffs and losing the cup final to local rivals the Romford Raiders.

The club's fiercest rivalry has traditionally been with the Raiders IHC and to a slightly lesser extent the Chelmsford Chieftains, with the Dynamos competing in the same league as the two Essex clubs for its first six seasons. However more recently a healthy rivalry has developed with Streatham IHC due to the geographical proximity of the two clubs.

== Players ==
=== Current Roster ===
As of 13th September 2026

(*) Denotes a Non-British Trained player (Import)

Netminders
No.	Nat.	Player	Catches	Acquired	Place of Birth	Joined from
1	(England)	Heath Prentice	L	2025	London, England	Invicta Mustangs
32	(England)	Brad Windebank	L	2024	London, England	Romford Raiders
64	(England)	Nikolai Divall		2025	England	Invicta U19

Defencemen
No.	Nat.	Player	Shoots	Acquired	Place of Birth	Joined from
7	(England)	Leonard Eeles	L	2025	Redhill, England	Invicta U19
13	(England)	Daniel Scott	R	2023	Chatham, England	Romford Raiders
16	(England)	Reuben Yeates	R	2025	Gillingham, England	Invicta U19
18	(England)	Preston Tombs	R	2025	Guildford, England	Peterborough Phantoms
22	(Lithuania) (England)	Megas Kanys	R	2026	Kaunas, Lithuania	Romford Raiders
36	(England)	Callum Burnett	R	2026	England	Romford Raiders
75	(England)	Dylan Worthy	L	2024	Maidstone, England	Invicta U19
84	(England)	Michael Stokes	R	2022	Chatham, England	Invicta Mustangs
87	(England)	Harrison Lillis	R	2011	Chatham, England	Invicta Mustangs

Forwards
No.	Nat.	Player	Shoots	Acquired	Place of Birth	Joined from
8	(England)	James Stanmore	R	2026	England	Invicta U19
9	(England)	Cameron Pywell		2024	England	Sheffield Scimitars
11	(England)	Callum Wilson	L	2026	England	Invicta U19
14	(England)	Luca Pascale		2025	London, England	Romford Raiders
15	(England)	Harrison Prentice	R	2025	London, England	Boston Jr. Bruins
19	(England)	Adam Erskine	R	2026	England	Basingstoke Bison
28	(Denmark)	Mads Thune*	L	2023	Herlev, Denmark	Gladsaxe Bears
51	(England)	Ashley Jackson	L	2025	Tunbridge Wells, England	Romford Raiders
67	(England)	Jared Vigar		2025	England	Guildford Phoenix
71	(Latvia) (United Kingdom)	Artjoms Kazaks	L	2026		Romford Raiders
74	(Canada) (United Kingdom)	William Robinson	L	2026	Upper Tantallon, Canada	Ontario Tech University
91	(England)	Callum Fowler	L	2009	London, England	Peterborough Phantoms
95	(England)	Jacob Ranson	R	2025	Romford, England	Berkshire Bees

=== Current Staff ===
As of 13th September 2026

Team Staff
Nat.	Name	Position	Acquired	Place of Birth
(England)	Karl Lennon	Head Coach	2022	Chatham, England
(England)	Elliot Andrews	Assistant Head Coach	2022
(England)	Neil Ratcliffe	Equipment Manager	2022

== Seasons ==
Season	Regular Season											Postseason
Season	League	P	W	OW	L	OTL/SOL	T	GF	GA	Pts	Pos	Postseason
2012-13	NIHL 1	32	19	-	12	-	1	175	124	39	4th	Semi Finals
2013-14	NIHL 1	32	21	-	7	-	4	198	114	46	3rd	Semi Finals
2014-15	NIHL 1	36	25	-	11	-	0	202	140	50	2nd	Runners-up
2015-16	NIHL 1	36	23	-	7	-	6	153	92	52	2nd	Semi Finals
2016-17	NIHL 1	28	16	-	10	-	2	113	99	34	2nd	Champions
2017-18	NIHL 1	32	6	3	19	4	-	88	137	22	8th	Quarter FInals
2018-19	NIHL 1	42	2	2	38	0	-	66	232	8	8th	Quarter Finals
2019-20	NIHL1	36	16	0	16	2	-	174	158	34	5th	Cancelled
2020-21	Season Cancelled											
2021-22	NIHL 1	32	13	1	16	2	-	142	156	30	6th	Quarter Finals
2022-23	NIHL 1	28	14	0	13	1	-	132	127	29	4th	Semi Finals
2023-24	NIHL 1	28	15	0	10	3	-	132	105	33	5th	Quarter Finals
2024-25	NIHL 1	36	18	2	14	2	-	181	129	60	5th	Semi Finals
2025-26	NIHL 1	28	16	1	10	1	-	93	70	51	4th	Semi Finals
2026-27	NIHL 1											

== Top 5 All-time points scorers ==
As of 13/09/26

Name	Games	Goals	Assists	Points
Andy Smith	437	530	515	1045
Elliott Andrews	370	263	342	605
Callum Fowler	271	240	356	596
Juraj Huska	216	245	220	465
Anthony Leone	429	200	183	383

== Retired Jerseys ==
No.	Nat.	Player	Position	Playing years
5	(Scotland)	Andy Martin	Defence	1998-2006
6	(England)	Anthony Lennon	Defence	2004-2013
10	(Slovakia)	Ondrej Zosiak	Defence	2015-2019
12	(England)	Karl Lennon	Forward	2003-2011
23	(England)	Phil Chard	Defence	1997-2006
29	(England)	Anthony Leone	Forward	2006-2013

== Club Honours ==
=== 1997-98 ===
English Division 1 Southern Champions

=== 2001-02 ===
EPIHL Champions
EPIHL Playoff Champions

=== 2002-03 ===
ENIHL Southern Champions
ENIHL Southern Playoff Champions

=== 2003-04 ===
ENIHL Southern Champions
ENIHL Southern Playoff Champions
Kent & Essex Cup Champions

=== 2004-05 ===
ENIHL Southern Champions

=== 2005-06 ===
ENIHL Southern Champions
ENIHL National Champions
ENIHL Playoff Champions
ENIHL Cup Champions

=== 2006-07 ===
ENIHL Southern (Conference B) Champions

=== 2007-08 ===
ENIHL Southern Champions
ENIHL National Champions

=== 2009-10 ===
ENIHL Southern Champions

=== 2014-15 ===
NIHL Southern Cup Champions

== Other Ice Hockey teams based in Gillingham ==
- Invicta Dynamics (Ladies)
- Invicta Mustangs (Second senior team)
- Invicta Colts (Under 18's)
- Invicta Junior Dynamos (Under 16's)
- Invicta Dynamites (Under 14's)
- Invicta Devils (Under 12's)
- Invicta Imps (Under 10's)
- Medway Madness (Recreational)
- Medway Eagles (Beginner Recreational)
- Medway Marauders (Recreational)
- Kent Knights (University)
