= List of schools in Medway =

This is a list of schools in Medway, in the English county of Kent.

== State-funded schools ==
=== Primary schools ===
- All Faiths' Children's Academy, Strood
- All Saints CE Primary School, Chatham
- Balfour Infant School, Rochester
- Balfour Junior School, Chatham
- Barnsole Primary School, Gillingham
- Bligh Primary school Strood
- Brompton-Westbrook Primary School, Brompton
- Burnt Oak Primary School, Gillingham
- Byron Primary School, Gillingham
- Cedar Children's Academy, Strood
- Chattenden Primary School, Chattenden
- Cliffe Woods Primary School, Cliffe Woods
- Crest Infant School, Rochester
- Cuxton Community Infant School, Cuxton
- Cuxton Community Junior School, Cuxton
- Deanwood Primary School, Park Wood
- Delce Academy, Rochester
- Elaine Primary School, Strood
- English Martyrs RC Primary School, Strood
- Fairview Community Primary School, Wigmore
- Featherby Infant and Nursery School, Gillingham
- Featherby Junior School, Gillingham
- Gordon Infant Children's Academy, Strood
- Gordon Junior Children's Academy, Strood
- Greenvale Primary School, Chatham
- Halling Primary School, Halling
- Hempstead Infant School, Hempstead
- Hempstead Junior School, Hempstead
- High Halstow Primary Academy, High Halstow
- Hilltop Primary Academy, Frindsbury
- Hoo St Werburgh Primary School, Hoo St Werburgh
- Horsted Primary School, Chatham
- The Hundred of Hoo Academy, Hoo St Werburgh
- Kingfisher Community Primary School, Walderslade
- Lordswood School, Lordswood
- Luton Primary School, Chatham
- Maundene School, Walderslade
- Miers Court Primary School, Rainham
- Napier Primary Academy, Gillingham
- New Horizons Children's Academy, Chatham
- New Road Primary School, Chatham
- Oaklands School, Walderslade
- Oasis Academy Skinner Street, Gillingham
- Parkwood Primary School, Rainham
- Peninsula East Primary Academy, Stoke
- Phoenix Primary School, Chatham
- The Pilgrim CE School, Borstal
- Riverside Primary School, Rainham
- Rochester Riverside CE Primary School, Rochester
- St Augustine of Canterbury RC Primary School, Rainham
- St Benedict's RC Primary School, Lordswood
- St Helen's CE Primary School, Cliffe
- St James' CE Primary Academy, Isle of Grain
- St John's CE Infant School, Chatham
- St Margaret's at Troy Town CE Primary School, Rochester
- St Margaret's CE Junior School, Rainham
- St Margaret's Infant School, Rainham
- St Mary's Island CE Primary School, St Mary's Island
- St Mary's RC Primary School, Gillingham
- St Michael's RC Primary School, Chatham
- St Nicholas CE Primary School, Strood
- St Peter's Infant School, Rochester
- St Thomas More RC Primary School, Chatham
- St Thomas of Canterbury RC Primary School, Rainham
- St William of Perth RC Primary School, Rochester
- Saxon Way Primary School, Gillingham
- Swingate Primary School, Lordswood
- Temple Mill Primary School, Strood
- Thames View Primary School, Rainham
- Twydall Primary School, Gillingham
- Wainscott Primary School, Wainscott
- Walderslade Primary School, Walderslade
- Warren Wood Primary Academy, Rochester
- Wayfield Primary School, Chatham
- Woodlands Primary School, Gillingham

=== Non-selective secondary schools ===
- Brompton Academy, Brompton
- Greenacre Academy, Walderslade
- The Howard School, Rainham
- The Hundred of Hoo Academy, Hoo St Werburgh
- Leigh Academy Rainham, Rainham
- Leigh Academy Strood, Strood
- Maritime Academy, Strood
- Rainham School for Girls, Rainham
- The Robert Napier School, Gillingham
- St John Fisher Catholic School, Chatham
- The Thomas Aveling School, Rochester
- The Victory Academy, Chatham
- Walderslade Girls' School, Walderslade
- Waterfront UTC, Chatham

=== Grammar schools ===
- Chatham Grammar School for Girls, Chatham
- Fort Pitt Grammar School, Chatham
- Holcombe Grammar School, Chatham
- Rainham Mark Grammar School, Rainham
- Rochester Grammar School, Rochester
- Sir Joseph Williamson's Mathematical School, Rochester

=== Special and alternative schools ===
- Abbey Court Special School, Strood
- Bradfields Academy, Chatham
- Danecourt School, Gillingham
- Inspire Free Special School, Chatham
- Rivermead School, Gillingham
- The Rowans, Chatham
- Will Adams Academy, Gillingham

=== Further education ===
- MidKent College

== Independent schools ==
=== Primary and preparatory ===
- Bryony School, Rainham
- St Andrew's School, Rochester

=== Senior and all-through schools ===
- King's School, Rochester
- Rochester Independent College, Rochester

=== Special and alternative schools ===
- Blue Skies School, Chatham
- City of Rochester School, Cliffe Woods
- The GFC School, Gillingham
- Manorway Independent School, Strood
- Trinity School, Rochester

== Homeschooling ==
Medway’s recorded numbers of children electively home educated have risen in recent years. As of 1 December 2024, Medway recorded 1,019 pupils as electively home educated. Earlier in 2024 the council recorded 870 EHE pupils (31 January 2024), showing an upward trend locally.

== Former schools ==
- Chatham Ragged School

== See also ==
- University for the Creative Arts
- Universities at Medway
