= Waterfront UTC =

Waterfront University Technical College

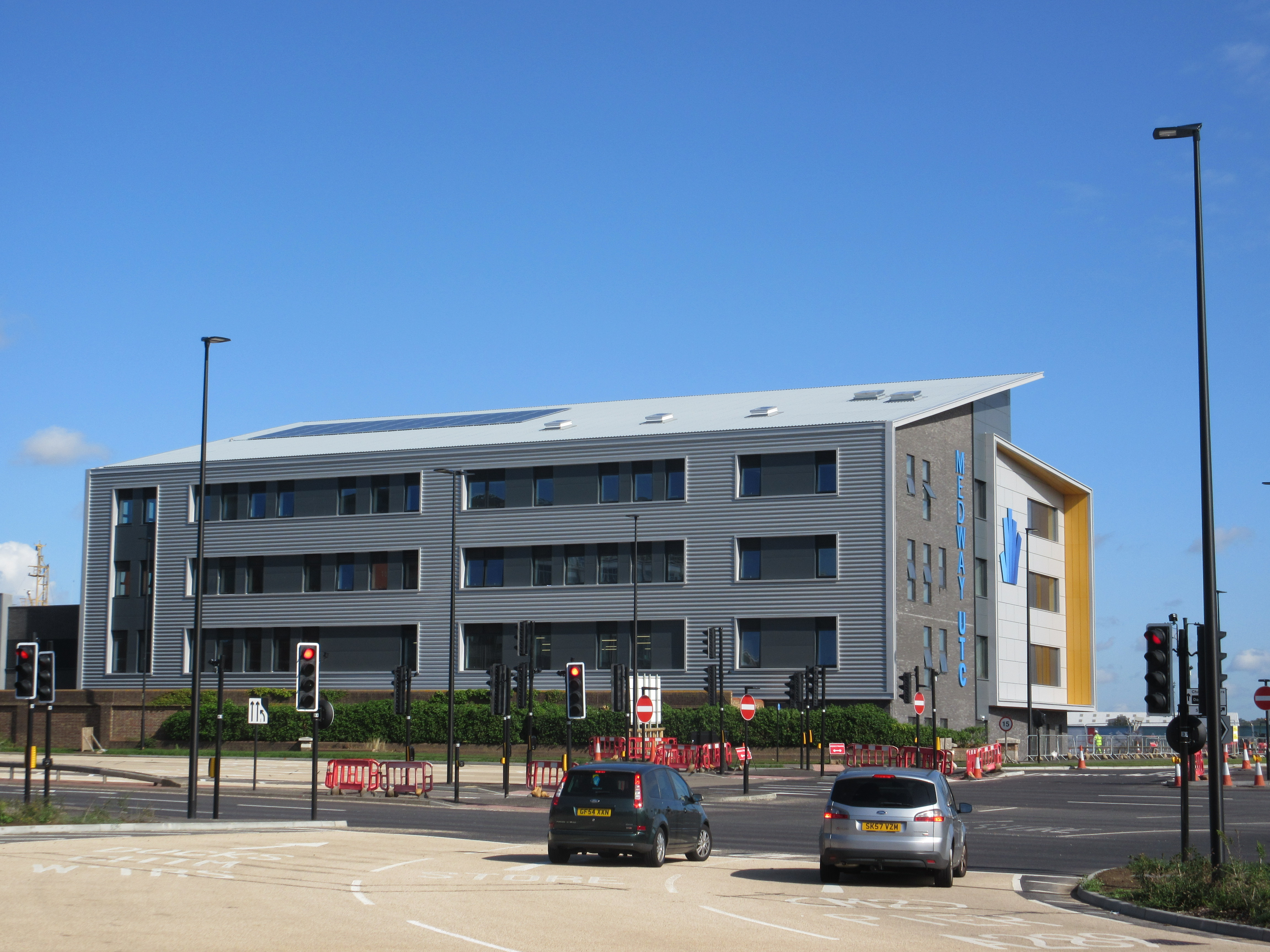

Location
- Southside Three Road; Chatham, Kent, ME4 4FQ; England; 51.3973°N 0.5487°E

Information
- Former name: Medway UTC
- Type: University Technical College
- Established: 2015 (as Medway UTC)
- Trust: The Howard Academy Trust
- Department for Education URN: 146648 Tables
- Ofsted: Reports
- Interim Principal: Paul Cottam
- Age: 14 to 19
- Enrolment: 278 (March 2018) 198 (March 2021)
- Capacity: 600 (March 2018) 375 (March 2021)
- Rebrokered: September 2018
- Previous URN: 142081
- Website: www.waterfront-that.org.uk

Waterfront UTC is a University Technical College in Chatham, Kent, England, which opened in September 2015 as Medway UTC on a site between Pier Road and South Side Three Road. After receiving an "inadequate" rating in every category in an Ofsted inspection in March 2018, the college joined The Howard Academy Trust in November 2018 and its name was changed.

== Governance ==
The UTC was set up as a university technical college, so legally is a trust. It has seven trustees and a board of governors consisting of the trustees and five other governors appointed by the sponsors.

== Sponsors ==
The UTC's sponsors include the University of Greenwich, MidKent College and BAE Systems. Students who successfully complete their education are guaranteed an interview and conditional offer at the university.

Other sponsors are Delphi Diesel Systems, BAM, Bouygues Construction, ECITB (Engineering Construction Industry Training Board), Royal School of Military Engineering, Kreston Reeves, Gainwell Futures and Medway Council.

== History ==
University technical colleges are part of a political decision to reform education. Around the time of planning Medway UTC, the area had a surplus of secondary school places. A 2017 government briefing document contains a Standard Impact Assessment which showed that St John Fisher Catholic Comprehensive, Bishop of Rochester Academy and The Hundred of Hoo Academy were likely to be severely impacted by the creation of the UTC, losing pupils. These schools already had surplus capacity of 271, 532 and 436 respectively.

Dr Karon Buck, an Ofsted inspector, was the UTC's first principal; she was previously Vice Principal at Leigh Academies Trust. Dr Buck left mid-year, at Christmas 2017, to become CEO of an International School in Abu Dhabi. She was replaced as interim principal by Paul Cottam, formerly of The Howard School.

The UTC was inspected by Ofsted on 6–7 March 2018, with findings published in May 2018. The school was rated "inadequate" in all categories, leading to a conclusion that "this school requires special measures because it is failing to give its pupils an acceptable standard of education and the persons responsible for leading, managing or governing the school are not demonstrating the capacity to secure the necessary improvement in the school."

In November 2018, the name of the college was changed from Medway UTC to Waterfront UTC, and it joined the Howard Academy Trust, a multi-academy trust based at The Howard School, Rainham. The change gave the UTC a three-year respite from Ofsted inspections, as it was classed as a "fresh start".

== Admissions ==
Entry is at 14 for Key Stage 4 and at 16 for Key Stage 5. The school has a capacity of 600; only 278 were on roll in 2018.

== Curriculum ==
The prospectus states that students study a broad and balanced curriculum in a building that has been designed and equipped to allow specialist study in Engineering, Construction & Design. The school operates an extended day, finishing at 5.30, which includes supervised study time.

At Key Stage 4, students were offered English, Maths and Science (Combined or Biology, Physics, Chemistry). Students could select from the following options: Design & Technology – Resistant Materials, Design & Technology – Systems and Control, Computing, a Modern Foreign Language, Geography, History, Art & Design or Business Studies. These were subjects supplemented by a BTEC first diploma in Engineering, or Construction and the Built Environment. The school has closed the Computing option and does not meet the requirements for the provision of physical education or religious education.

Students aged 16–19 can study A Levels and specialise in Engineering or Construction.

== Ofsted assessment ==
Medway UTC was rated 'inadequate', by the OFSTED judgement published 4 May 2018; it was criticised for low expectations, narrow curriculum and poor results in its specialist subjects.

Ofsted found that: "there is a culture of low expectation across the UTC; current progress in all year groups very weak; poor GCSE and A Level results last year as a result of weak teaching; the curriculum is too narrow; there is no provision for physical education or religious education in the school; behaviour in lessons is poor and sometimes disruptive. These are the consequences of: governors failing to offer sufficient challenge for leaders or training for leaders and teachers to carry out their duties effectively; of significant turbulence in staffing; leaders development plans being not fit for purpose; and failure by teachers to match assessment to the learning needs of pupils with the result that the most able, those with SEN, and the disadvantaged make very poor progress."

== Site ==
This UTC is in a £12 million purpose built building, in the Chatham Waters development in the former Chatham Dockyard. Full planning consent was granted by Medway Council in July 2014, and Bowmer and Kirkland, the lead contractor started on site in September 2014, and the building was complete in September 2015. The idea is that disaffected teenagers require a different type of school, one that is focused on a future career. The building is to be designed to look less like a school, and more like the world of work, and create a business-like environment.
