= Leigh Academy, Mascalls =

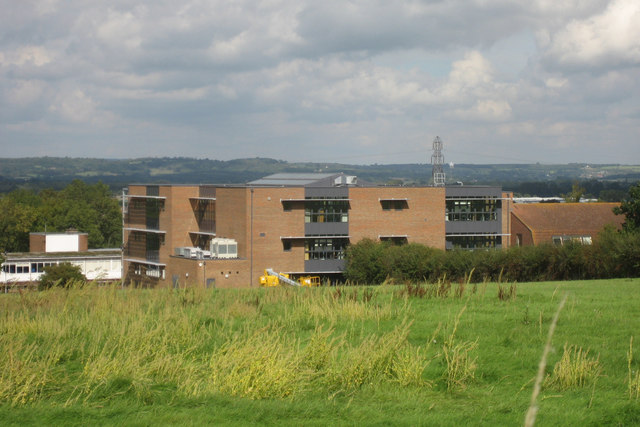

Location
- Maidstone Road; Paddock Wood, Kent, TN12 6LT; England; 51.1694°N 0.3889°E

Information
- Type: Academy
- Established: 1956
- Trust: Leigh Academies Trust
- Department for Education URN: 136847 Tables
- Ofsted: Reports
- Principal: Jo Brooks
- Gender: Mixed
- Age: 11 to 18
- Enrolment: 1,216
- Houses: Earhart; Shackleton; Luther King; Marie Curie
- Website: Leigh Academy, Mascalls

Leigh Academy, Mascalls (formerly Mascalls School) is a co-educational secondary school and a sixth form with academy status located in Paddock Wood, Kent.

== Etymology ==
The name comes from the nearby Mascalls corner.

== History ==
The school opened in 1956 as Mascalls School, a foundation school administered by Kent County Council. It became an academy in 2011, and in 2015 it joined the Leigh Academies Trust.

Stuart Reeves, headteacher since 2010, was promoted to LAT Executive Director of the West Kent cluster of academies at the time of the school's accession to the Leigh Academies Trust in 2015. Wayne Barnett then became principal, having previously served as vice principal since 2013. In 2019, Barnett was promoted by the Leigh Academies Trust to serve as the principal of Stationers' Crown Woods Academy. The vice principal at the time, William Monk was then promoted to principal of Mascalls.

The Leigh Academies Trust has given all students in the trust, including the students at Mascalls, Quest 2s to help with learning.

The academy had a therapy dog called "Levi" after Claude Lévi-Strauss. He was a Cocker Spaniel, born on 23 May 2019, and registered with the Pets As Therapy charity.

When High Weald Academy closed in September 2022, all pupils from Year 7 to Year 10 were offered places at Mascalls.

Following the promotion of the current principal, William Monk, to a senior executive position within the Leigh Academies Trust, it was announced that Jo Brooks would become principal from 1 January 2023.

== Houses ==
Mascalls Academy is organised into four houses (called "colleges"), named after "significant individuals".

For the lower school:

- Earhart (named after Amelia Earhart)
- Shackleton (named after Ernest Shackleton)
- Luther King (named after Martin Luther King Jr.)

For the sixth form:

- Marie Curie (named after Marie Skłodowska Curie)

== Mascalls Gallery ==
A small art gallery was located on the school site from 2006 to 2016. It had a frequently changing programme of exhibitions featuring national and internationally known artists. These included Henry Moore, L. S. Lowry, Graham Sutherland and Lee Miller as well as artists from Latin America, Japan and the United States. In 2010, Mascalls Gallery exhibited for the first time in the UK drawings by Marc Chagall for the nearby All Saints' Church in Tudeley. An exhibition of watercolour paintings by Roland Collins led to further exhibitions in London, raising the artist's profile.

The gallery closed in June 2016 due to a lack of funds, and the building has since been refurbished as the new Mascalls Library.

== Ofsted ==
The school's last full inspection was in 2012 when it was judged as 'Good' by Ofsted.

== Notable alumni ==
- Philip Martin Brown, actor
