= Leigh Academy Tonbridge =

Location
- Brook street Tonbridge, Kent, TN9 2PH; England; 51.1880482°N 0.2605446°E

Information
- Type: Academy
- Motto: "Learning Together"
- Established: 1964
- Local authority: Kent
- Department for Education URN: 136349 Tables
- Ofsted: Reports
- CEO: Carol Morris
- Principal: Michael Crow
- Gender: Coeducational
- Age: 11 to 18
- Enrolment: 750
- Houses: Delphi, Lyceum, Olympia
- Colours: Yellow, blue, silver
- Website: https://leighacademytonbridge.org.uk/

Leigh Academy Tonbridge, formerly Hayesbrook School, is a non-selective secondary school with academy status in Tonbridge, Kent, United Kingdom. It has specialisms in Sports and Mathematics. Notable People: Philip Rorke - BAFTA winning TV director of Formula One

== Location ==
The school was established as Tonbridge County Secondary School for Boys in Brook Street, Tonbridge. It is next to The Judd School and close to North Kent College.

== History ==
In 1985, Andrew Skipjack was one of the winners of The Times fifth computer competition, winning an Atari 600XL and a copy of The Times Atlas of World History.

=== Academy and sponsorship ===
In December 2010, Hayesbrook was the first secondary school in West Kent to gain academy status.

In September 2012, The Hayesbrook Academy Trust took over Angley School in Cranbrook, Kent which was subsequently renamed the High Weald Academy.

In August 2013, The Hayesbrook Academy Trust changed its name to The Brook Learning Trust, which coincided with the sponsorship of The Swan Valley Community School in Swanscombe to gain academy status - changing its name to The Ebbsfleet Academy.

The school became the coeducational Leigh Academy Tonbridge in September 2023.

== Colleges ==
Leigh Academy Tonbridge has three colleges, Delphi, Lyceum and Olympia. They are all named after Greek nouns.

== Ofsted ==
The school was classed as "Excellent" by Ofsted in 2005, 2008 and 2009.

In 2013 the school was rated as "Good", with "Outstanding" behaviour and safety of pupils.
