= Ebbsfleet =

Ebbsfleet may refer to:

- Ebbsfleet Valley, a redevelopment zone of the Thames Gateway in north west Kent, England
  - Ebbsfleet River
  - Ebbsfleet International railway station
  - Ebbsfleet United F.C., formerly Gravesend & Northfleet F.C.
  - The Ebbsfleet Academy, actually located in nearby Swanscombe
- Ebbsfleet, Thanet, a hamlet in north east Kent, England
  - Bishop of Ebbsfleet
