= Gillingham Grammar School =

Gillingham Grammar School may refer to:

- Gillingham Grammar School, Dorset in Gillingham, Dorset
- Gillingham Grammar School, Kent in Gillingham, Kent
