= 2009 in England =

- Centuries: 19th; 20th; 21st
- Decades: 1980s; 1990s; 2000s; 2010s; 2020s
- See also: 2008–09 in English football 2009–10 in English football 2009 in the United Kingdom; Other events of 2009

Events from 2009 in England

== Incumbent ==
- Monarch - Elizabeth II
- Prime Minister - Gordon Brown

== Events ==
=== January ===
- 2 January – A light aircraft crashes into overhead power cables on the West Coast Main Line near the village of Little Haywood in Staffordshire, causing widespread disruption to train services, and reportedly killing the three occupants of the aircraft.
- 5 January –
  - Cold weather consisting of snow and freezing temperatures causes widespread disruption across the UK. Travel routes are severely affected including roads and railways, in addition to Luton and Birmingham airports respectively. The weather also leads to the closure of many schools who were due to return after the Christmas break.
  - Waterford Wedgwood, makers of the famous Wedgwood pottery, enters administration.
- 7 January – England Cricket Captain, Kevin Pietersen resigns after months of rows with England Manager, Peter Moores. Moores is sacked from his job by the England and Wales Cricket Board. Andrew Strauss is named as the new Captain.
- 12 January – At the 66th Golden Globe Awards, British actress Kate Winslet wins two awards, Best Actress (Motion Picture Drama) and Best Supporting Actress (Motion Picture); while British film Slumdog Millionaire wins all four of the awards for which it is nominated.
- 15 January –
  - Approval is granted for the building of the controversial third runway and sixth terminal at Heathrow Airport. As part of the decision, the Secretary of State for Transport, Geoff Hoon, announces restrictions on aircraft using the third runway that are designed to limit noise pollution and carbon dioxide emissions, alongside proposals for a high-speed rail hub, also located at Heathrow.
  - John McDonnell, Labour MP for Hayes and Harlington, the constituency which includes Heathrow Airport, is suspended from Parliament after picking up the ceremonial House of Commons mace in protest at the government's approval of a third runway.
- 23 January – Karen Matthews and Michael Donavon are sentenced to eight years in prison for the kidnap of Shannon Matthews, the former's daughter, having held her captive in Donvon's flat in Dewsbury last year as part of a bid to claim £50,000 for her "safe return" after reporting her missing to the police.
- 26 January – Possession of "extreme pornography" becomes illegal under the Criminal Justice and Immigration Act 2008.
- 28 January – Hundreds of workers go on strike at the Lindsey Oil Refinery in Lincolnshire in protest at the hiring of foreign construction workers at the site, despite rising unemployment in the UK.

=== February ===
- 2 February – Contractors at the Sellafield and Heysham nuclear plants walk out in the ongoing unofficial strike action over foreign workers.
- 3 February – Adverse weather conditions continues to cause widespread disruption to education and transport in large parts of England.
- 5 February –
  - Further heavy snow in parts of England and Wales causes fresh school closures and travel disruption.
  - Workers participating in unofficial strikes over the use of foreign workers agree to return to work after a compromise deal is struck by Acas.
- 9 February – Chelsea F.C. manager Luiz Felipe Scolari is sacked by the club's board after results deteriorate "at a key time in the season". It comes just hours after fellow Premier League manager, Tony Adams of Portsmouth F.C., is sacked, again after a poor run of results.
- 13 February – A BA CityFlyer flight from Amsterdam loses its nosewheel on arrival at London City Airport due to a "hard landing". One passenger is hospitalised with minor injuries.
- 18 February – The Yorkshire Ripper is released from Broadmoor Hospital to face a life sentence, for killing 13 women and attempting to kill 7 more, after doctors claim he has been treated for schizophrenia.
- 22 February – TV personality, Jade Goody and her boyfriend, Jack Tweed, are married at Down Hall, Essex. Goody, 27, has had cervical cancer for six months and was told earlier this month that she may only have weeks to live after the cancer spread to her bowel, liver and groin. Tweed is free on license following imprisonment for assault.
- 25 February – Labour Party peer Lord Ahmed is sentenced to 12 weeks imprisonment for dangerous driving, having been involved in a fatal crash.

=== March ===
- 1 March – Manchester United F.C. win the 2009 Carling Cup, beating Tottenham Hotspur F.C. 4–1 on penalties in the final. The scores stood level at 0–0 after 90 minutes and extra time.
- 4 March – ITV announces it is cutting 600 jobs after it reported a loss of £2.6 billion for 2008. The jobs will go from the company's Yorkshire studios in Leeds and from their headquarters in London.
- 5 March – Michael Jackson announces his last concert series, This Is It to be held at the O2 Arena in London. The concerts are never held due to his death three months later.
- 6 March – Police launch an investigation after a protester throws green custard at the Business and Enterprise Secretary, Peter Mandelson, in protest at the government's decision to approve the construction of a third runway at Heathrow Airport.
- 18 March – Sean Hodgson, who has served 27 years in prison since being convicted of murder in 1982, is acquitted at the Court of Appeal in London.
- 22 March – Jade Goody, the reality TV star, dies at her home in Essex after a seven-month battle against cancer.

=== April ===
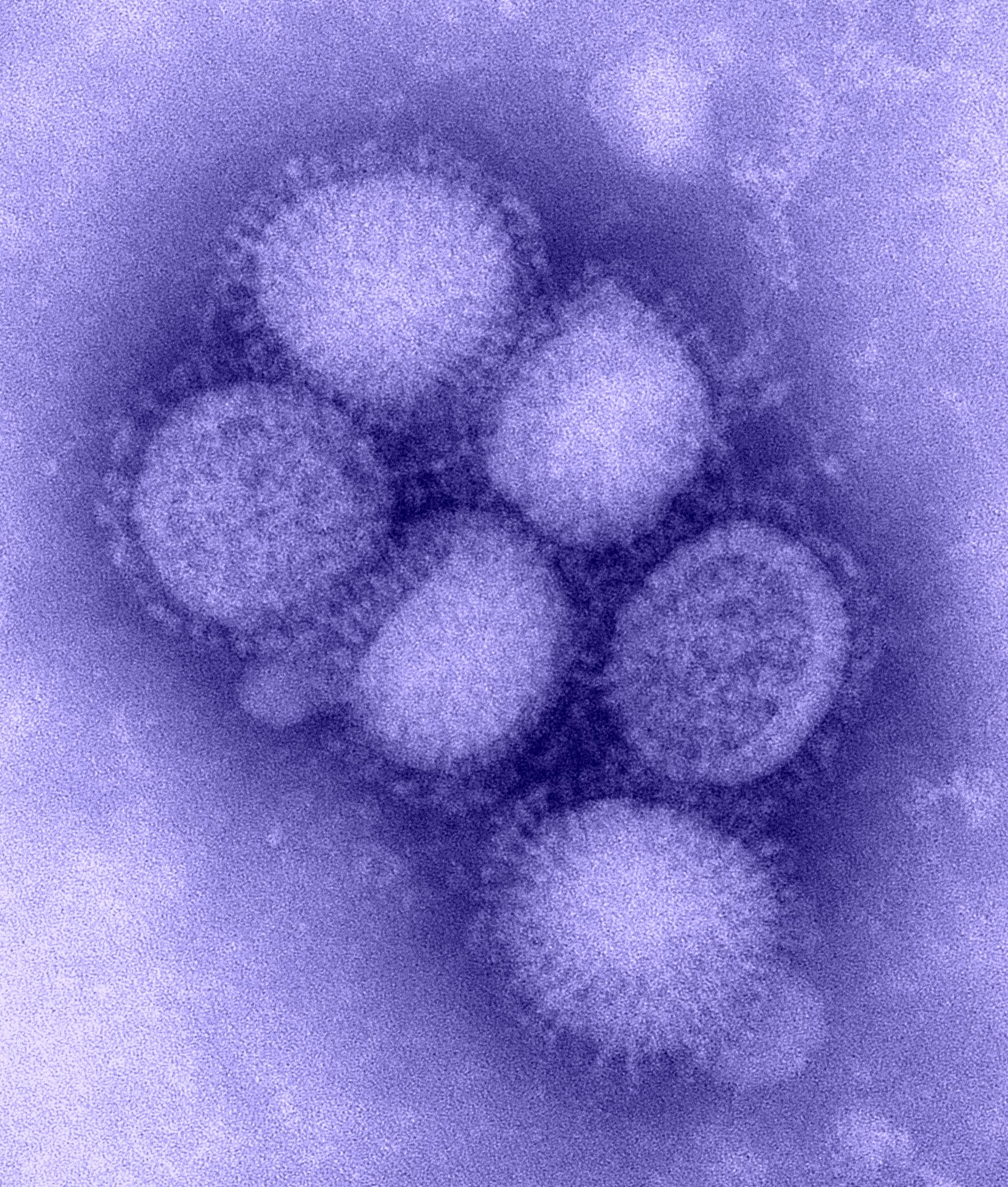
Magnified image of the H1NI flu virus, which resulted in a pandemic.

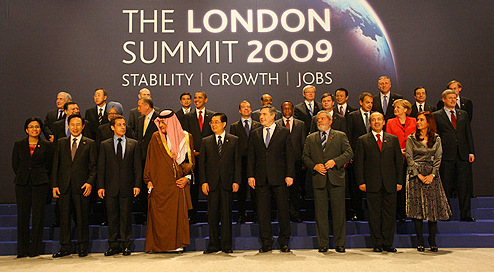
The world leaders present at the G20 London Summit.

- 1 April – Protests are held across London ahead of the following day's G-20 summit. Police report 63 arrests across the city, where a branch of the Royal Bank of Scotland is targeted by protesters, believed to be as a result of the ongoing anger at the pension of former Chief Executive, Fred Goodwin. The Metropolitan Police later announce that one protester died of a heart-attack during the protests.
- 2 April – The 2009 G-20 London summit is held due to the 2008 financial crisis. The summit ends in the leaders announcing various measures, including a $1.1 trillion investment in the International Monetary Fund (IMF) and World Bank.
- 8 April – Analogue television signals begin to be switched off in the Westcountry Television area as part of the UK's ongoing process of digital switchover.
- 29 April – Three cases of Swine Flu are confirmed in England. One adult is diagnosed in Redditch, another in South London, whilst a 12-year-old girl is diagnosed in Torbay. Meanwhile, the Scottish Health Secretary, Nicola Sturgeon announces that 15 suspected cases in Scotland are negative.
- 30 April – A further three cases of swine flu are confirmed by the Department of Health. Two of the cases are located in London, with the third being in Newcastle.

=== May ===
- 10 May – The decapitated body of Michael Gilbert is found in Arlesey. He had been kept as a slave and subject to year of abuse by the Watt family, six members of which were later jailed for their role in the murder.
- 16 May – Manchester United win the Premier League championship for the third consecutive year after a 0–0 draw against Arsenal F.C. at their home ground, Old Trafford. They have now equalled Liverpool's record tally of 18 top division titles.
- 27 May – Manchester United lose 2–0 to FC Barcelona of Spain in the European Cup final at Rome's Olympic Stadium.
- 30 May – Chelsea win the FA Cup for the fifth time after beating Everton 2–1 in the final at Wembley Stadium. Everton French striker Louis Saha scores the fastest ever FA Cup Final goal, after 23 seconds.

=== June ===
- 4 June – Elections are held to the European Parliament, alongside local council elections in England.
- 5 June – The results of the local elections are announced, with the remaining councils under Labour Party control all falling to the Conservative Party's control. The projected national vote shares suggests that the Conservatives achieved 38% of the vote, the Liberal Democrats 28% and Labour 23%.
- 7 June – The results of the European parliamentary elections, held on 4 June, are announced, and show large declines in the vote of the Labour Party. The far-right British National Party also win their first ever seats in a national election, being elected in North West England and Yorkshire and the Humber.
- 8 June – Female paedophile and nursery worker Vanessa George arrested in Plymouth over child pornography and sexual assault offences.
- 21 June – The final British Grand Prix (providing Donington Park is prepared on time) to be held at the Silverstone Circuit is won by Sebastian Vettel. Britain's Jenson Button and Lewis Hamilton finish 6th and 16th respectively.
- 22 June – English Conservative MP John Bercow is elected as the 157th Speaker of the House of Commons.
- 27 June – The English Defence League is formed by protesters who claim that the government has been weak and ineffectual against extreme Islam.

=== July ===
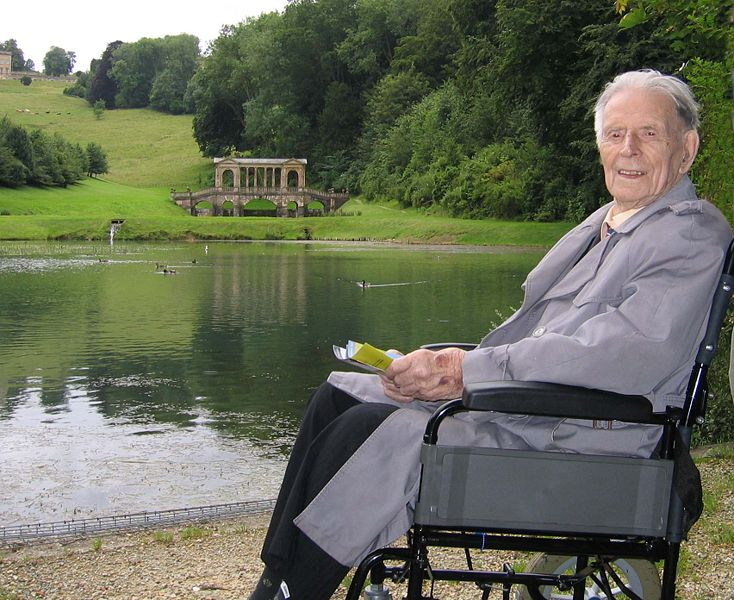
Harry Patch, the last British Army veteran of World War I, who died on 25 July aged 111.

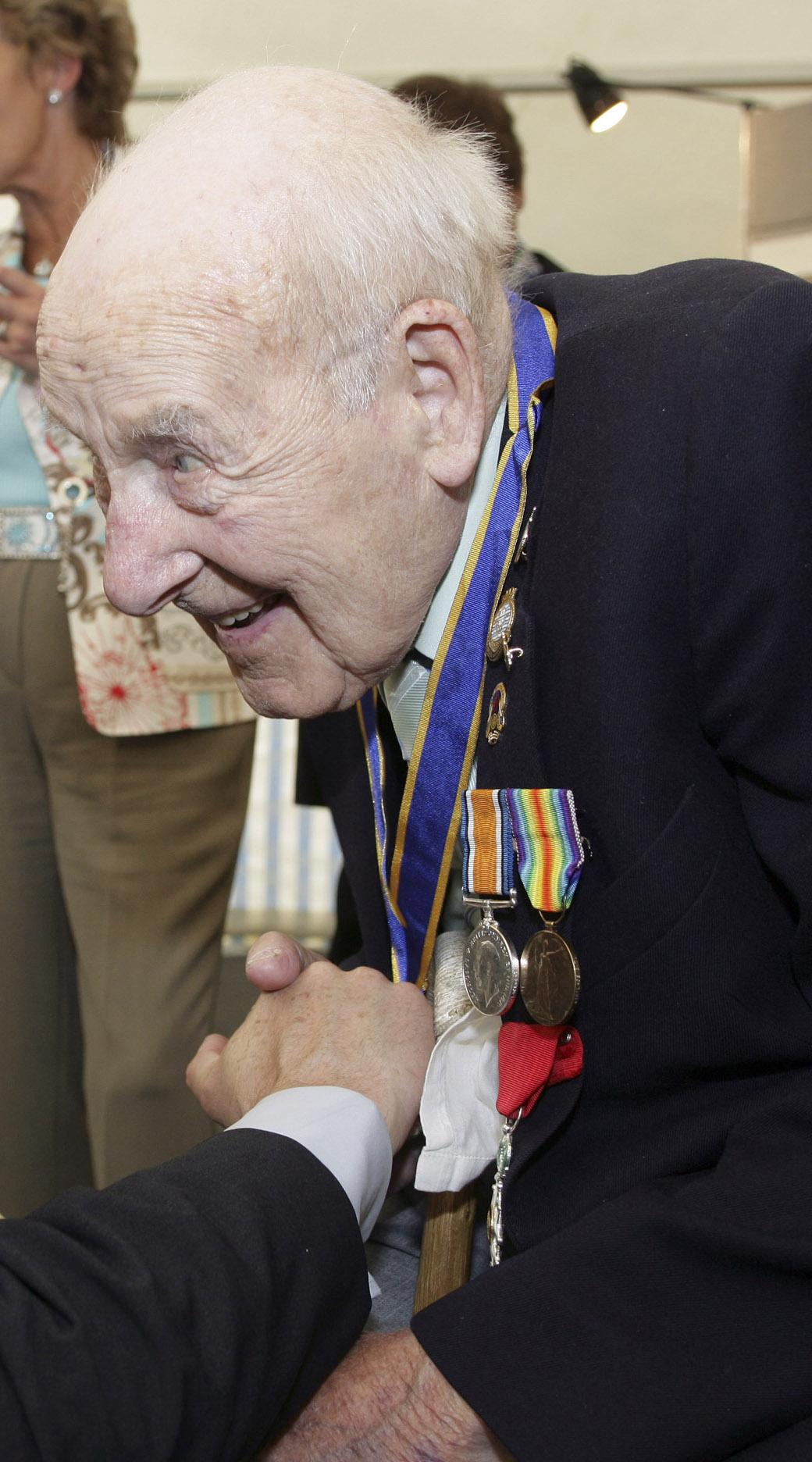
Henry Allingham, the oldest man in the world and one of the last surviving veterans of World War I, who died on 18 July aged 113.

- 1 July – The government announces that it is taking the InterCity East Coast franchise into a period of public ownership, after the incumbent operator, National Express East Coast, said it planned to default on its franchise agreement.
- 3 July – Six people, including three children, are killed after a fire in a high rise residential tower block in Camberwell, south London.
- 5 July – The Staffordshire Hoard, the largest haul of Anglo-Saxon treasure ever found, is uncovered. The 1,500 gold and silver pieces are discovered buried beneath a field in Staffordshire by metal detecting enthusiast Terry Herbert. This is made public on 24 September.
- 8 July – The First Test of the 2009 Ashes series takes place at Cardiff's Sophia Gardens
- 18 July – Henry Allingham, the world's oldest man and one of the last surviving First World War servicemen, dies aged 113.
- 24 July – The results of the previous day's Norwich North by-election are announced. The Conservatives win with a majority of more than 7,000, making their candidate, 27-year-old Chloe Smith the youngest MP in the UK. The election was held following the resignation of Labour's Ian Gibson over the MPs expenses row earlier in the year.
- 25 July – Harry Patch, the last British survivor of the First World War trenches and briefly the oldest man in the United Kingdom, dies aged 111. Claude Choules, a 108-year-old former Royal Navy serviceman who was born in Worcestershire but now lives in Australia, is the last surviving British veteran of the war and one of just three surviving of any nationality.
- 28 July – The International Rugby Board confirms that the United Kingdom has won the rights to stage both the 2013 Rugby League and the 2015 Rugby Union World Cups.
- 30 July – Multiple sclerosis sufferer Debbie Purdy makes legal history by winning her battle to have the law on assisted suicide clarified after the Law Lords rule in her favour.
- 31 July – Gary McKinnon, an English man with Asperger syndrome loses his latest High Court bid to avoid extradition to the United States to face charges of hacking into US Government computers.

=== August ===
- 6 August – Great Train Robber Ronnie Biggs, who is gravely ill, is granted release from prison on compassionate grounds.
- 23 August – In cricket, the Ashes series concludes with England defeating Australia 2–1.
- August – A metal detectorist discovers the Shrewsbury Hoard, about 10,000 Roman coins.
- 31 August - Temple School in Strood closes, merging with Chapter Girls School, to become Strood Academy, which opened in September 2009.

=== September ===
- 7 September – Convictions and acquittals in the trial for those charged over the 2006 transatlantic aircraft plot.
- 9 September – Westcountry Television completes the digital switchover process with the turning off of all analogue signals from the Caradon Hill transmitter.
- 14 September – Those convicted for their role in the 2006 transatlantic aircraft plot are sentenced.
- September - Strood Academy opens, following the closure of Chapter School and Temple School.

=== October ===
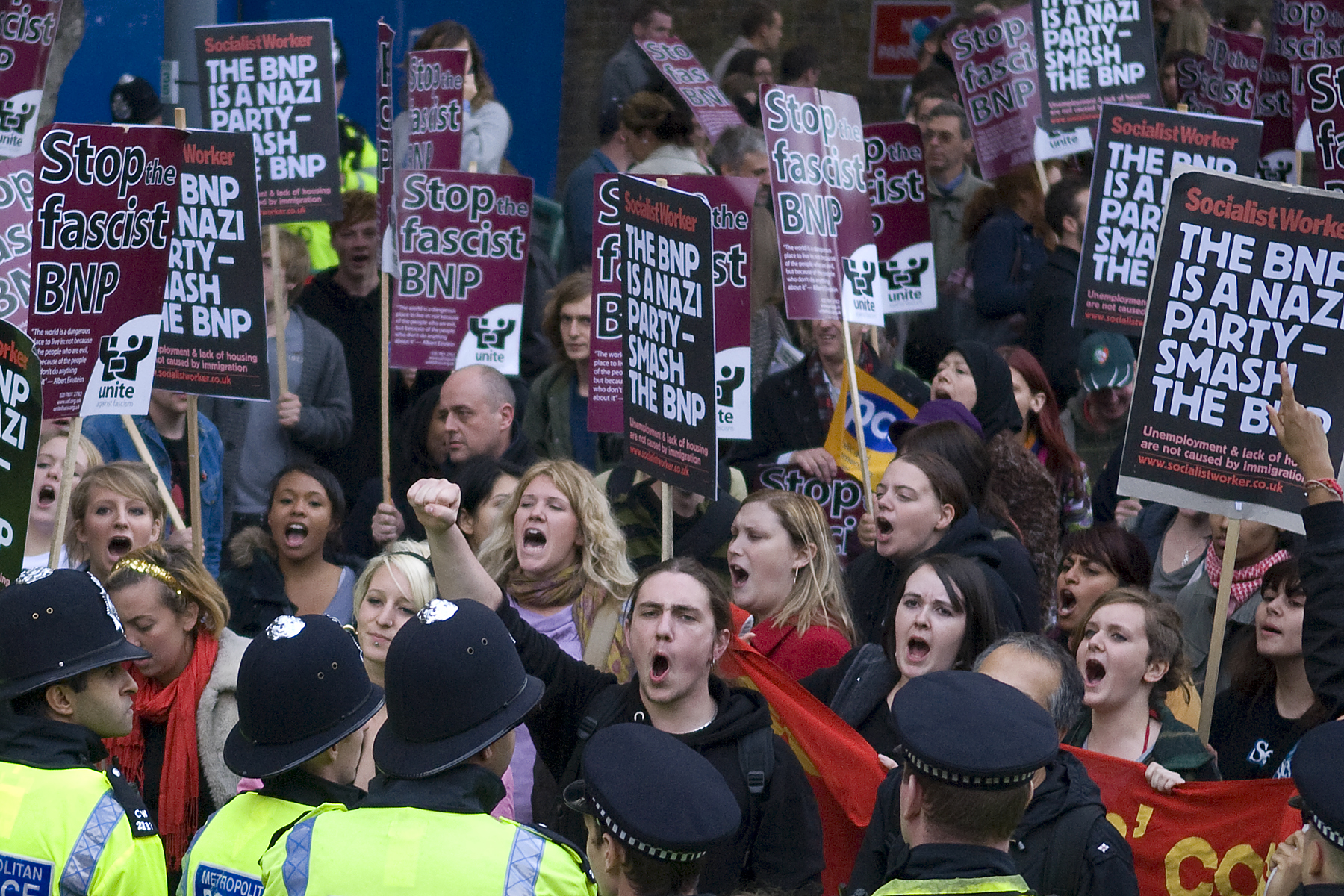
A crowd protests BNP Leader Nick Griffin's appearance on the BBC show Question Time.

- 18 October – England's Jenson Button wins the 2009 Formula One Drivers' Championship after finishing in 5th place at the Brazilian Grand Prix. English based team Brawn GP, who Button drives for, secures the Constructors' Championship at the same race, in their debut season.
- 22 October – British National Party leader Nick Griffin makes a controversial first appearance on the BBC One political debate programme Question Time. He later announces his intention to make a formal complaint to the BBC for the way he believed he was treated by the programme's audience, who he described as a "lynch mob" and the show's other guests.

=== November ===
- 4 November – Granada Television begins the process of digital switchover.
- 14 November – Severe gales and heavy rain from an Atlantic storm cause floods and damage across southern England and Wales.
- 19 November – Highest ever UK 24-hour rainfall total, 314.4 mm, recorded at Seathwaite Farm, Cumbria – a record which stands until December 2015.
- 20 November – Many towns and villages in Cumbria are flooded following several days of heavy rain. Three bridges collapse, one of them leading to the death of a police officer, who was standing on the bridge when it collapsed.

=== December ===
- 2 December – The Winter Hill transmitter has its remaining analogue signals turned off, completing the digital switchover process in the Granada Television region.
  - The England 2018 FIFA World Cup bidding team announce the 12 cities which will be part of their campaign to host the tournament. Wembley Stadium, Arsenal's Emirates Stadium, Manchester United's Old Trafford and Liverpool's Anfield or proposed new stadium are among the venues, as is the Stadium:mk in Milton Keynes which only opened in 2007.
- 15 December – Paedophile nursery worker Vanessa George is jailed indefinitely after previously admitting to seven sexual assaults and six counts of making and distributing indecent pictures of children.
- 18 December – Heavy snowfall causes widespread disruption across large parts of South East England, East Anglia, the East Midlands and Yorkshire and the Humber.

=== Undated ===
- The Church of England has designated 2009 as 'The Year of Child'

== See also ==
- 2009 in Northern Ireland
- 2009 in Scotland
- 2009 in Wales
