= Rainham School for Girls =

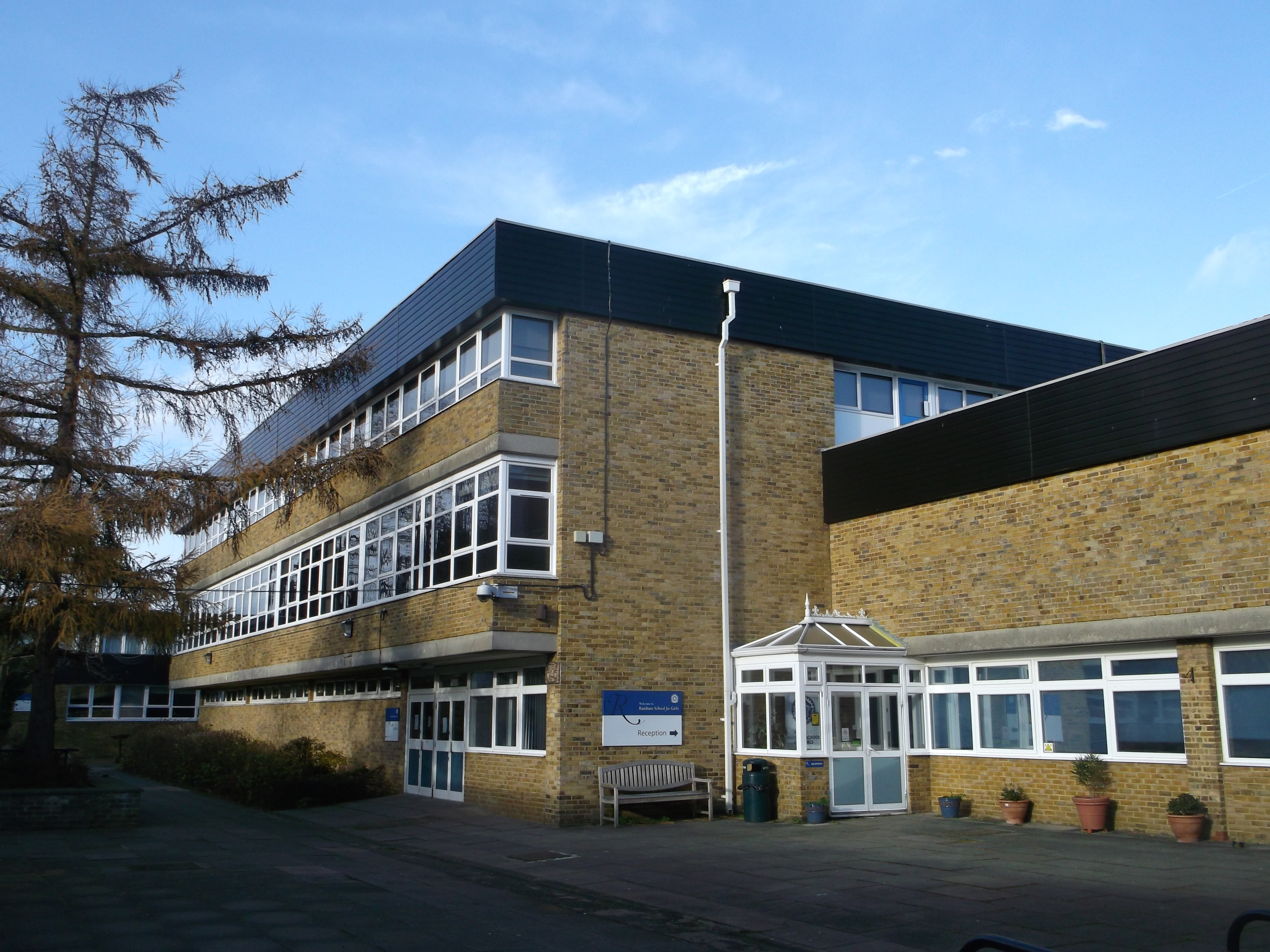

Location
- Derwent Way; Rainham, Gillingham, Kent, ME8 0BX; England
- 51.362685°N 0.591414°E

Information
- Type: Academy
- Motto: Inspiring learners, changing lives
- Local authority: Medway Council
- Trust: The Kemnal Academies Trust
- Department for Education URN: 136456 Tables
- Ofsted: Reports
- Headteacher: Mrs Vicki Shaw
- Gender: Girls
- Age range: 11–18
- Enrolment: 1,625 (20 April 2026)
- Capacity: 1,558
- Website: www.rainhamgirls-tkat.org

Rainham School for Girls is a secondary school and sixth form with academy status for girls in Rainham, Gillingham, Kent, England. It is next to the all-boys school, The Howard School and was a Technology College.

== History ==
It was previously a community school administered by Medway Council; the school converted to academy status on 1 March 2011.

== Governance ==
Managed by The Kemnal Academies Trust, a large multi-academy trust with 45 schools under its wing. 15 are secondary and 30 primary.

== Sport ==
The school is also the home to the Medway Netball League and Junior Netball League. Its large netball centre has eight floodlit courts (which are also suitable for tennis). In 2013, the school football team reached the final of the Npower Football League Girls Cup in Wembley Stadium. They played against a Derby County school.

The school also offers lettings to external businesses - such as pilates classes for adults - after school hours.
