= Leigh Stationers' Academy =

Location
- 145 Bexley Road; Eltham, Greater London, SE9 2PT; England; 51.45219°N 0.07619°E

Information
- Type: Comprehensive; Academy
- Motto: Aspire, Strive, Thrive; Relentlessly pursuing excellence...
- Religious affiliation: None
- Established: 1958; 68 years ago
- Trust: Leigh Academies Trust
- Department for Education URN: 141309 Tables
- Ofsted: Reports
- Principal: Kevin Watson
- Gender: Coeducational
- Age: 11 to 18
- Enrolment: 1,712
- Houses: Angelou (formally Ashdown); Caxton (formally Sherwood); Hansard (formally Delamere); Woolf (formally Arden)(sixth form)
- Colours: Red, Blue, Purple, Green
- Website: leighstationersacademy.org.uk//

Leigh Stationers' Academy (formally Stationers’ Crown Woods Academy) is a coeducational secondary school and sixth form with academy status, located in the Eltham area of the Royal Borough of Greenwich in London, England. The school is built upon the land that was formerly King Henry VIII's hunting grounds (hence the name before September 2024 'Crown Woods').

First known as Crown Woods School, the school was founded in 1958. It was reopened in new £48 million buildings designed by Nicholas Hare Architects in 2011 and was renamed Crown Woods College. In 2014 the school was renamed Stationers' Crown Woods Academy after the school gained academy status and joined the Leigh Academies Trust, the first Leigh academy outside Kent. In September 2024, the school was named Leigh Stationers' Academy.

== History ==
Between 1964 and 1985 or later the school had a boarding section for 120 children, mainly of serving Forces personnel, called The Lodge.

In 2000, Crown Woods was identified by Ofsted as a "failing school". The school was critical of the cursory inspections Ofsted had made to come to this judgement, and challenged it in court. In a humiliating 11th-hour climbdown, Ofsted agreed to an out-of-court settlement which spared it the embarrassment of a public hearing. Ofsted was ordered to pay the school's costs - estimated to run into five figures - as well as lifting its judgment. The chief inspector Chris Woodhead retired.

In a £100m investment by Greenwich Council that formed part of the government's 'Building Schools for the Future' initiative, the school was reopened in new £48 million buildings designed by Nicholas Hare Architects and built by main contractor Balfour Beatty, and was renamed Crown Woods College. A sport centre was built to regional competition standards with seating for 450 spectators.

== Structure ==
It is structured into four 'home schools', each in separate buildings. Three of the schools are for pupils aged 11 to 16 and pupils are allocated to the schools based on ability, skills and interests. The fourth school is a dedicated sixth form centre for 16- to 18-year-old students.

Previously a community school governed by Greenwich London Borough Council, Crown Woods College converted to academy status on 1 September 2014 and was renamed Stationers' Crown Woods Academy. The school is part of the Leigh Academies Trust and is sponsored by the Worshipful Company of Stationers and Newspaper Makers. From September 2024, the school was named "Leigh Stationers' Academy".

== Notable former pupils ==
- Sadik Balarabe, professional footballer
- Helen Mountfield, King's Counsel and Principal of Mansfield College, Oxford
- Michael Turner, former Sunderland and Norwich City defender
- Eoin Ó Broin, Sinn Féin politician
- Junior Stanislas, footballer
