= Temple School =

Location
- Cliffe Road; Strood, Kent, ME2 3DL; England; 51°24′25″N 0°29′35″E

Information
- Type: Community secondary modern
- Motto: NIHIL NISI OPTIMUM NOSTRUM - "Nothing but our best"
- Chair: G. Fox
- Head teacher: Neil J. McAree
- Gender: Boys
- Age: 11 to 16
- Enrolment: 625
- Website: temple.medway.sch.uk/

Temple School was a boys secondary modern in Strood, in England. It closed in 2009 along with Chapter Girls School when Strood Academy was opened.

== History ==
In 2006, 2% of the pupils gained 5 passes with Maths and English at GCSE, leading the press to dub it the worst school in the country. In 2007, it was 16% and the press were not interested. In 2007, Temple school beat 4 Medway schools in the key KS2- KS4 value added indicator.

== Curriculum ==
The school followed the National Curriculum at Key Stage 3, but were more flexible at Stage 4 The subjects students were allowed take depended much on ability, the following subjects were optional at GCSE:

History, Geography, Graphics, Resistant Materials, Food Technology, Leisure and Tourism, Btech Sports, Diploma in Digital Applications (DiDA), French, German, Religious Education, Music, Drama, Art, Btech Art.

Temple School also offered to the more advanced students:

Triple Science, Additional Mathematics, English Literature.

== Notable former pupils ==
- Cheavon Clarke, boxer, European Championships and Commonwealth Games medalist
