= Longfield Academy, Kent =

Longfield Academy
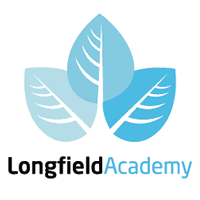

Location
- Main Road; Longfield, Kent, DA3 7PH; England; 51°23′50″N 0°18′22″E

Information
- Type: Academy
- Motto: Achieving Beyond expectations
- Established: 2010
- Local authority: Kent LEA
- Trust: Leigh Academies Trust
- Department for Education URN: 135630 Tables
- Ofsted: Reports
- Principal: Felix Donkor
- Gender: Mixed
- Age: 11 to 19
- Houses: Galileo , Matisse and Anderson
- Previous names: Axton Chase School & Longfield Comprehensive
- Website: www.longfieldacademy.org

Longfield Academy is an academy school in Longfield, Kent, England. The academy is operated by Leigh Academies Trust and occupies the site where Longfield Comprehensive and Axton Chase School used to be. Longfield Academy moved into new buildings in July 2011 and has 877 pupils.

== History ==
Longfield Academy occupies part of the former site of Axton Chase School, which closed in 2010. The academy was rebuilt at a different location on the former site, the old buildings were demolished and re-developed as housing.

== Structure ==
Longfield Academy is part of Leigh Academies Trust. The Trust also includes 22 other academies. All of the Academies share one governing body, and are led by a chief executive officer based at the Trust offices.

== Electronic learning ==
The academy aimed to provide students with new ways to learn and reach their potential. The academy offered an iPad scheme for use in their everyday education.

While there's no official announcement that the "iPad scheme " had been cancelled, the consistent focus on Chromebooks suggests the iPads have been phased out or replaced as the primary device for students.
