= Leigh Academy Minster =

Academy in Minster-on-Sea, Kent, England

Location
- Minster Road; Minster-on-Sea, Kent, ME12 3JQ; England; 51.4195°N 0.7827°E

Information
- Type: Academy
- Motto: The Minster Way
- Religious affiliation: None
- Local authority: Kent
- Trust: Leigh Academies Trust
- Department for Education URN: 150935 Tables
- Ofsted: Reports
- Chair of Governors: Gordon Henderson MP
- Principal: Mathieu Stevens
- Gender: Mixed
- Age: 11 to 18
- Enrolment: ~1,150
- Website: leighacademyminster.org.uk

Leigh Academy Minster is a mixed secondary school and sixth form (ages 11–18) located in Minster-on‑Sea, Kent, England. Opened 1 September 2024, it replaced Oasis Academy Isle of Sheppey and is sponsored by the Leigh Academies Trust.

== Background: Oasis Academy Isle of Sheppey ==
Oasis Academy Isle of Sheppey, established 2009, was rated *inadequate* across all Ofsted categories in June 2022 due to bullying, discriminatory language, attendance below 50%, and unsafe social media behaviors; Sixth Form was rated *requires improvement*. Extended monitoring and teacher strikes followed.

== Transition ==
In April 2023, the Department for Education selected Leigh Academies Trust and EKC Schools Trust to replace Oasis with two schools:

- Leigh Academy Minster (11–18 academic focus, PAN 180 + Sixth Form 250)
- EKC Sheppey Secondary (11–16 technical focus, PAN 150)

Existing Y10–11 and Y13 students remained on site to avoid disruption.

== Opening and governance ==
Leigh Academy Minster opened 1 September 2024. Mathieu Stevens—formerly of Leigh Academy Dartford and Halley Academy—was appointed Principal designate in November 2023 and took leadership on opening day. Gordon Henderson MP became Chair of Governors.

== External review ==
In March 2025, Leigh Academy Minster underwent a three-day Challenge Partners review, receiving a top accreditation as an Area of Excellence for its Small School College model. Leadership was judged "Leading" and provision "Effective."

== Admissions and demand ==
The academy has a Year 7 intake of 180. In 2024, it was 123% oversubscribed; Kent County Council approved a bulge of 30 places for 2025. By 2025, LAM received 222 first-preference applications, double the 180 places. Sixth Form provides 250 places.

Entry to Cody College follows selective criteria; Sixth Form requires at least five GCSEs grade 5+, including English and Maths, with a grade 6+ requirement for science/maths A‑levels.

== Collegiate structure ==
Leigh Academy Minster operates a "small school" college model:

- Cody College – named after Samuel Franklin Cody, selective grammar stream
- Hewlett College – Sixth Form, named for Hilda Hewlett
- Johnson College – named for Amy Johnson
- Wright College – named for the Wright brothers

Each college serves ~350 students (250 in Sixth Form) with their own leadership.

== Curriculum and digital strategy ==
Key Stage 3 is taught via the IB Middle Years Programme; Key Stages 4–5 offer GCSEs, A‑levels, BTECs, and the IB Career-related Programme. The academy issues 1:1 Chromebooks to all students for school and home use.

== Campus and SEND provision ==
The former Oasis site was redeveloped: new library, updated classrooms, sports facilities. A two-storey SEND building (Snowfields Unit), funded with £2.5 m from KCC, opens in September 2025 for up to 60 EHCP students.

== Behaviour, ethos & safeguarding ==
LAM follows "The Minster Way," a "warm strict" regime: high expectations, firm boundaries, punctuality, zero tolerance of bullying, no make-up, and strict uniform. Behaviour has improved dramatically—supported by new library (initial stock 3,000 books), consistent detention policies, and college-based pastoral support. Staff and students report positive culture change.

The designated safeguarding team—led by Mr Mortley, Mr Stevens, Mr Spocchia, and others—ensures robust child protection procedures, ongoing training, assemblies on online safety, and anti-bullying.

== Ofsted & Trust performance ==
Though too new for inspection, the academy benefits from its sponsor's record: Leigh Academies Trust (31 schools) oversees institutions with strong academic outcomes. For example, Leigh Academy Milestone—a special school—earned its fourth consecutive *outstanding* rating in June 2025, celebrating transformative care and strong leadership.

== Academic performance ==
As of 2025, Leigh Academy Minster has not yet published full public examination results, with its first GCSE cohort expected to complete Key Stage 4 in summer 2026, and its first full Sixth Form A-level or IB Career-related Programme results anticipated in 2028.

In the interim, the academy has received external validation. In March 2025, a Challenge Partners national review team rated the school's collegiate model an "Area of Excellence" and leadership "Leading," praising the school's early culture and progress monitoring systems.

Leigh Academy Minster is part of the Leigh Academies Trust, which has a strong track record in public examinations:

- In August 2024, LAT reported improved outcomes in GCSE performance trust-wide, with over 55% of pupils entered for the full English Baccalaureate (EBacc).
- In February 2025, LAT schools achieved some of the highest value-added scores in Kent and Medway for post-16 education, including a +0.46 average for applied general qualifications—well above the national average.

The first official Progress 8, Attainment 8, and EBacc entry and attainment figures for Leigh Academy Minster are expected in 2026, when the Department for Education publishes performance tables for new schools.
