= Joseph Chamberlain Sixth Form College =

Location
- Belgrave Road, Highgate; Birmingham, West Midlands, B12 9FF; England; 52°27′44″N 1°53′18″W

Information
- Department for Education URN: 130468 Tables
- Ofsted: Reports
- Gender: Mixed
- Age: 16 to 19
- Website: www.jcc.ac.uk

Joseph Chamberlain Sixth Form College is located in Highgate, Birmingham, England (1 Belgrave Road, Birmingham B12 9FF, UK). The College offers a wide range of A-level and BTEC programmes. It also has an adult education provision. It is located in Birmingham and the building was designed by London-based Nicholas Hare Architects in 2008. Joseph Chamberlain College is a sixth form college independently governed by its own Corporation and funded by the Government.

It is not a school sixth form, nor is it part of a large FE college as is the case in most sixth form centres. The college offers many courses for students aged between 16 and 19 years. It also has courses for adults aged above 19 years of age and vocational programmes as well.
