= Swattenden =

Coordinates: 51.082290°N 0.530130°E

- Location within Kent
- Civil parish: Cranbrook and Sissinghurst
- District: Tunbridge Wells
- Shire county: Kent
- Region: South East
- Country: England
- Sovereign state: United Kingdom
- Post town: CRANBROOK
- Postcode district: TN17
- Dialling code: 01580
- Police: Kent
- Fire: Kent
- Ambulance: South East Coast
- UK Parliament: Weald of Kent

Swattenden is a small settlement in the parish of Cranbrook and Sissinghurst in England.

It is situated on the B2086 (Swattenden Lane) about 1 mile (1.6 km) from Hartley, where the A229 crosses the settlement. It has an agricultural/country shop, a fruit farm and a fishing centre.

== Swattenden House ==
Swattenden House is a mansion built in 1860. It was the site of Swattenden Secondary School for Boys which moved to Angley School in 1972. It then became the "Swattenden Centre", a Kent County Council residential education centre, in 1976. It was used to house asylum seekers for a number of years.

== Toponymy ==
The suffix -enden is found in many place names in the Kentish Weald, meaning the pasture or clearing in the forest belonging to the people of a named person. Here the person was called Swaeðel. In 1240, the Old English Swaeðeling denn, was written as Swetlingdenn, in 1260 it was spelled Swetlyngdenne and in 1305 Swethyngden.
