= Berengrave Chalk Pit =

Nature reserve in Kent, England

Coordinates: 51.373°N 0.613°E

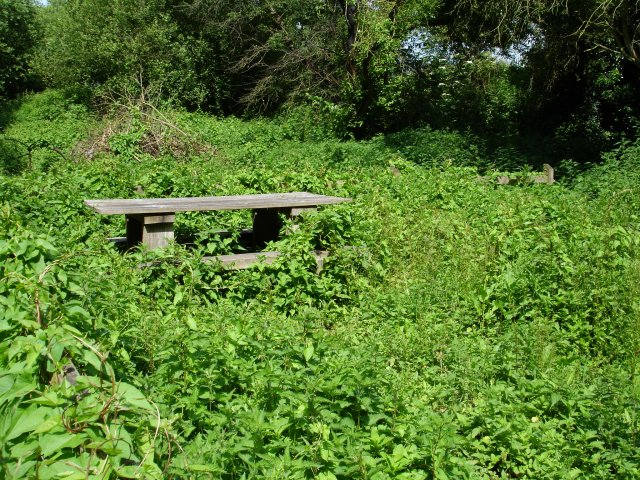
- Interactive map of Berengrave Chalk Pit
- Type: Local Nature Reserve
- Location: Rainham, Kent
- OS grid: TQ 820 670
- Area: 12.77 hectares (31.6 acres)
- Manager: Medway Council

Berengrave Chalk Pit is a 12.77-hectare (31.6-acre) Local Nature Reserve in Rainham in Kent. It is owned and managed by Medway Council.

There is a small lake in a disused chalk pit, and other habitats are scrub, woodland and reedbeds, which flood an area of willow carr.

There is access from Berengrave Lane.
