= Brompton Academy =

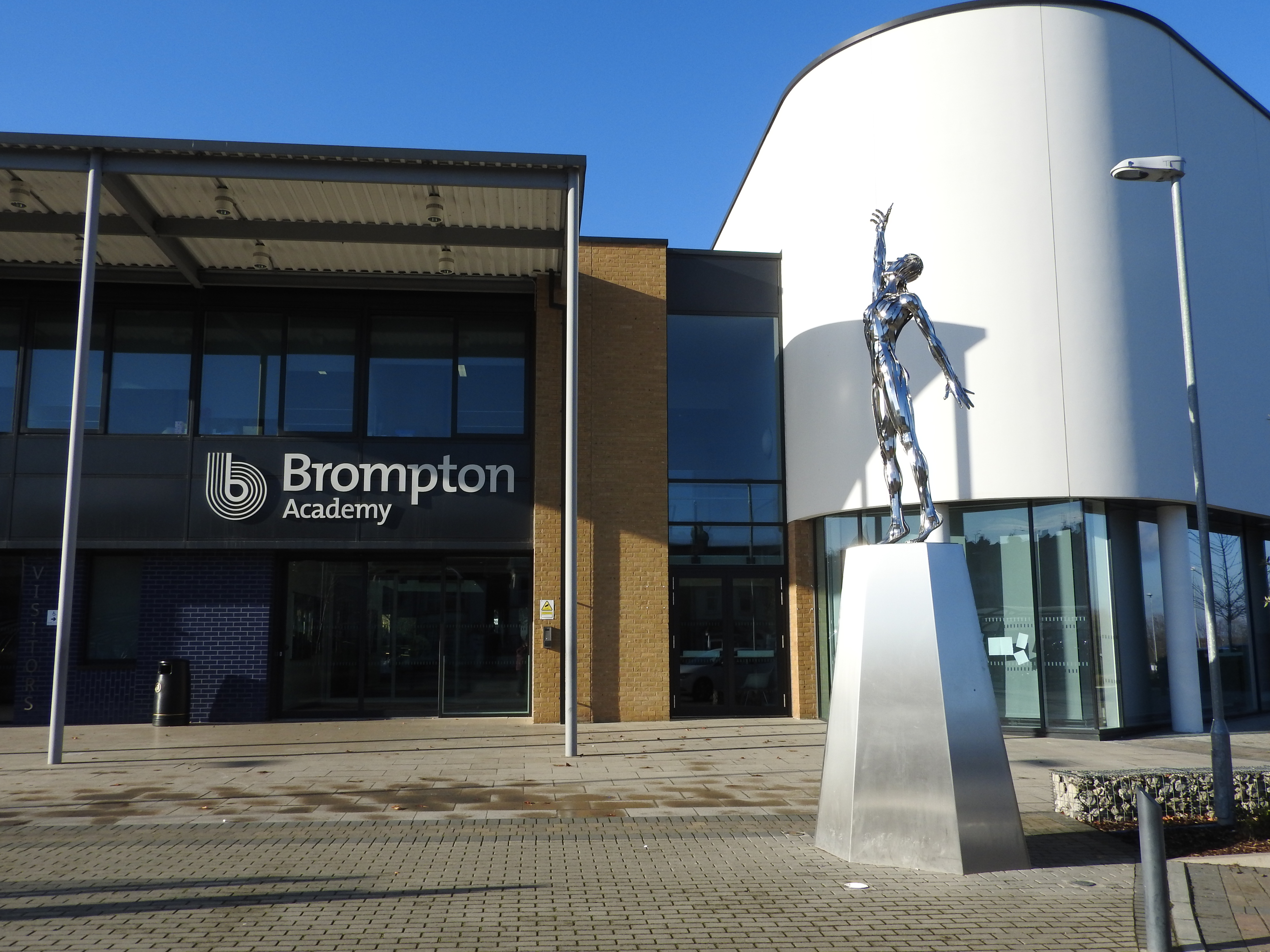

Location
- Marlborough Road; Gillingham, Kent, ME7 5HT; England; 51.3831°N 0.5393°E

Information
- Type: Academy
- Local authority: Medway Council
- Trust: University of Kent Academies Trust UID: 16829
- Department for Education URN: 136107 Tables
- Ofsted: Reports
- Principal: Dan Walters
- Staff: 170
- Gender: Mixed
- Age range: 11–18
- Enrolment: 1,400 (2019)
- Capacity: 1,400
- Website: www.bromptonacademy.org.uk

Brompton Academy is an 11–18 mixed, secondary school and sixth form with academy status in Gillingham, Kent, England. It is part of the University of Kent Academies Trust.

== History ==
Brompton Academy was originally called The Great Lines School. It was built in the 1950s adjacent to the Great Lines, in Gillingham. Gillingham was a military town that supported the Royal Engineers and their barracks and the Chatham Naval Dockyard. As a consequence families were very mobile. It opened with 270 pupils in April 1957, as a secondary modern school and the first co-educational school in Gillingham. In June 1959, it became Upbury Manor school and was officially re-opened by actress Dame Edith Evans O.B.E.

=== University of Kent Academies Trust ===
University of Kent Academies Trust
- Founded: 27 August 2010
- Type: Multi-academy Trust
- Registration no.: 07185018
- Location: Brompton Academy, Brompton Academy, Marlborough Road, Gillingham, Kent, ME7 5HT

It later became New Brompton College and is now known as Brompton Academy. The Brompton Academy opened in 2010. The University of Kent is a 'Lead Sponsor' of the Academy, because of its ability to help provide support for the Academy's science specialism. Medway Council is the co-sponsor.

From 2017, Chatham Grammar School for Girls and Brompton Academy's sixth-forms have merged into one big sixth-form named the University of Kent Academies Trust (UKAT). Both schools are a part of the newly formed Academies Trust, of which the CEO is Mr. A. Osborne.

== School performance and inspections ==
Brompton Academy has been awarded a “Requires Improvement” score from Ofsted; the school was inspected between 21 and 22 September 2022.

== Buildings ==
The school has undergone a renovation. As part of the new redevelopment, all of the existing school buildings have been replaced with a new building, except for the existing reception building, which has been retained as part of the design. BAM Construction (part of BAM Nuttall) won the £80m contract to design and build three new academy schools for Medway Council, including Brompton Academy, Strood Academy and Bishop of Rochester Academy.

== Extra curricular ==
Pupils from the school were chosen to form part of a "guard of honour" for athletes at the opening ceremony of the 2012 Olympic Games, displaying artistic creations their school made to celebrate the event.

== Controversies ==
In 2010, a boy was sent home for wearing red socks. The school also sends students home for too skinny trousers and chewing gum, and along with a few other students .
