= The Leigh UTC =

Location
- Brunel Way; Dartford, Kent, DA1 5TF; England; 51.4600°N 0.2240°E

Information
- Type: University technical college
- Established: 2014
- Founder: Sir Geoffrey Leigh
- Department for Education URN: 140987 Tables
- Ofsted: Reports
- CEO: Simon Beamish
- Principal: Kevin Watson
- Gender: Mixed
- Age: 11 to 19
- Enrolment: 730
- Capacity: 960
- Website: theleighutc.org.uk

The Leigh UTC is a University Technical College (UTC) for the Dartford area of Kent, England, that opened in September 2014. The UTC specialises in Engineering and Computer Sciences.

Building work started in October 2013 at the Bridge development, where Joyce Green Hospital once stood. The main building opened to students in September 2014.

The Leigh UTC has a project-based approach to learning.

As with all UTCs, a number of businesses and organisations support the College. These include:

- University of Greenwich
- Bluewater
- Kenard Engineering
- Eurostar

The Leigh UTC has opened a five-form entry Key Stage 3 feeder college, the Inspiration Academy, on the UTC site, in effect converting the education model into one of an 11–18 free school.

The Leigh UTC is part of Leigh Academies Trust.
