= Roland Collins =

English painter

Roland Arthur Frank Collins (17 September 1918 – 27 September 2015) was an English painter, specialising in watercolours of English architecture. Unknown for most his lifetime, his work came to prominence after a successful exhibition at Mascalls Gallery, Paddock Wood, Kent in 2012, which led to further exhibitions in Mayfair.

== Biography ==
Collins was born on 17 September 1918 in Kensal Green, London. He attended Kilburn Grammar School and studied art at St Martin's College. Upon graduation he worked in advertising for the London Press Exchange. In World War II he was registered as a conscientious objector, conditional upon undertaking light agricultural work; he had a weak heart, which probably would have exempted him from military service in any case.

Afterwards he took ownership of a studio in Fitzrovia, which he used for the remainder of his career. In the 1960s, he bought a cottage in Whitstable, Kent, and painted the shoreline scenery he found there.

Collins' work included The Grapes (1936), a view of a pub on Limehouse Reach painted from the River Thames' point of view, and the illustrations for Charlotte Haldane children's book "Fifi and Antoine". In 1993, he staged a one-man exhibition, "London and Dieppe: A Retrospective", based on his trips there.
