= High Weald Academy =

The High Weald Academy

Location
- Angley Road; Cranbrook, Kent, TN17 2PJ; England
- Coordinates: 51.1000°N 0.52832°E

Information
- Type: Academy
- Motto: Aspiration Achievement and Ambition
- Closed: August 2022
- Local authority: Kent County Council
- Trust: Leigh Academies Trust
- Department for Education URN: 138236 Tables
- Ofsted: Reports
- Gender: Coeducational
- Age: 11 to 18
- Houses: Angley, Sheafe, Swattenden, Weald (Since 2020)
- Website: www.highwealdacademy.kent.sch.uk

The High Weald Academy was a coeducational secondary school that opened in 1971 located in Cranbrook, Kent, England.

The academy permanently closed in September 2022, with all the pupils from Year 7 to Year 10 offered places at Mascalls Academy.

== History ==
Angley School was established in 1971 by the merger of Mary Sheafe School for Girls (on the current site) and Swattenden Secondary School for Boys (based at Swattenden House). The school is well-known locally for its on-site farm.

The Mary Sheafe Hall and Swattenden Hall are named after the schools which were merged to form Angley School.

Angley School became the first Specialist Sports College in Kent in 2000. The school benefits from the facilities at the adjacent Weald Sports Centre.

Angley School became The High Weald Academy on 1 September 2012, sponsored by The Brook Learning Trust.

A new building was opened in 2019.

The academy closed permanently in September 2022, despite opposition from MP Helen Grant.

=== Headteachers/Principals ===
- Michael Head (1971-1993)
- Stephanie Bedford (1993-2006)
- Philip Morris (2006-2009)
- Deborah Coslett (2010-2012)
- Robert Jackson (2012-2014)
- Carrie Beech (2014-2016)
- Caroline Longhurst & Nicola Taylor (2017-2018)
- Daniel Hatley (2018–2020)
- Nicola Taylor (2020-2021)
- Nigel Jones (2021–2022)

== Ofsted ==
A 2001 Ofsted inspection found Angley School to be 'satisfactory'. In addition, a 2011 Ofsted Inspection found the school to be making 'Good' progress. These inspections took place before the conversion to High Weald Academy. It has since been inspected three times, most recently in 2019 when the rating was "requires improvement".
