= Nicholas Hare Architects =

British architectural company

Nicholas Hare Architects is an RIBA chartered architectural practice based in London, with a portfolio of award-winning projects. These include schools, higher education, refurbishment, commercial projects, and buildings for the arts. Founded by Nicholas Hare in 1977, the practice is now a limited liability partnership with over 20 employees. The office is based in Hoxton Square, in the London Borough of Hackney. Nicholas Hare Architects LLP is a member of the UK Green Building Council and achieves BREEAM Excellent rating for several of its completed buildings.

== Notable buildings ==
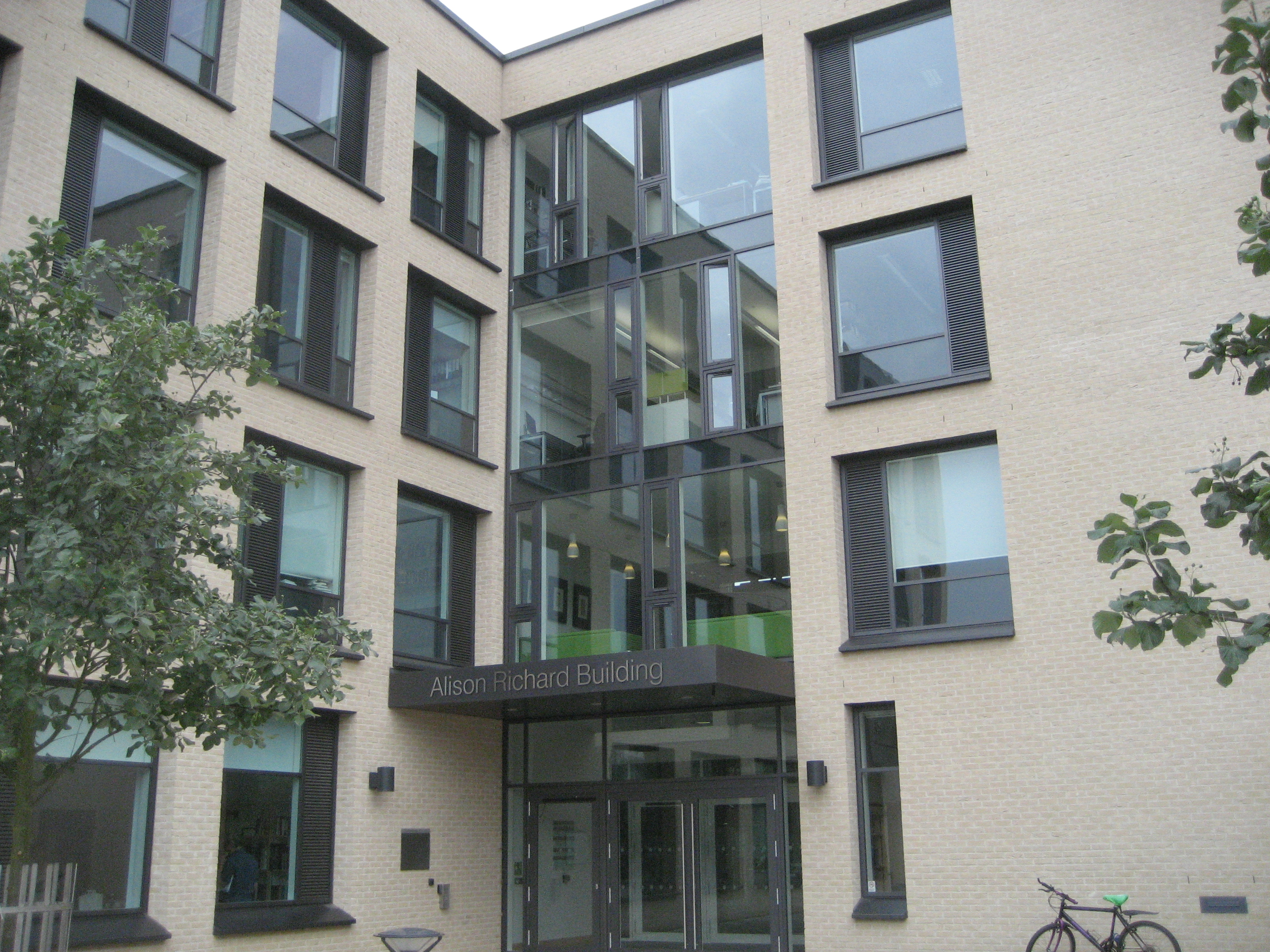
Alison Richard Building, Cambridge

Notable buildings include:

- Golden Lane Campus next to the Barbican
- Brunei Gallery for the University of London
- UK Headquarters building for Nokia in Farnborough for Segro
- Science Building & Drama Centre for St Paul's School, London
- Joseph Chamberlain Sixth Form College Birmingham
- Sadler's Wells Theatre in Islington
- Richard Doll Building for the University of Oxford
- Education & Simulation Centre for the Royal College of Surgeons of England
- Student Services Centre for the University of Southampton
- The David Attenborough Building at the University of Cambridge
- Alison Richard Building on the Sidgwick Site at the University of Cambridge
- Roald Dahl Plass in Cardiff, Wales
- Headquarters Complex in Farnborough for Segro
- Royal College of Obstetricians and Gynaecologists London
- Hawkshead Campus Gateway Building, Royal Veterinary College
- Cornelius Vermuyden School on Canvey Island
- Research and Development building for NOKIA in Farnborough for Segro
- UK Headquarters building in Slough for O2.
- Production Workshop and new Costume Centre in Thurrock for the Royal Opera House
- Royal Courts building in Guernsey

== Awards ==
The practice won the Prime Minister's 'Better Public Building' award for Joseph Chamberlain Sixth Form College in 2009. The same project was awarded the RIBA/Learning and Skills Council Further Education Building Design Excellence Award. Nicholas Hare Architects has won several Civic Trust Awards and commendations for several projects and was named Best School Architect at the British Council for School Environments Awards in 2009.

2025

- The Richard Cairns Building, a winner of the 2025 Public & Community Award, The Sussex Heritage Trust.

2022

- The Study Preparatory School, Wimbledon, shortlisted in the Schools category of the AJ Architecture Awards.
- UCL School of Management - Level 50 of One Canada Square in Canary Wharf, shortlisted in the Refurbishment Project of the Year category at the Building Awards 2022.

2021

- Kings High School, Warwick, RIBA London Regional Awards.
- UCL New Student Centre, RIBA London and National Awards.
- UCL New Student Centre, shortlisted for Project of the Year (Public Use), CIBSE Building Performance Award.

2020

- UCL New Student Centre, Prix Versailles 2020 Global Architecture Award in the Campuses category.
- UCL New Student Centre, shortlisted for the RIBA Regional Awards.
- UCL New Student Centre, winner of the Civic Trust Awards 2020.
- UCL Bloomsbury Theatre, shortlisted for the RIBA Regional Awards.
- Kings High School, Warwick, shortlisted for the RIBA Regional Awards.

2019

- UCL New Student Centre, Winner: Building Performance, Building Awards, 2019.
- UCL New Student Centre, Winner : Higher Education, AJ Architecture Awards, 2019.

2018

- The David Attenborough Building, Winner: RIBA East Award, 2018.
- The David Attenborough Building, Winner: RIBA East Conservation Award, 2018.
- The David Attenborough Building, Winner: RIBA National Award, 2018.

2017

- The David Attenborough Building, Winner AJ Retrofit Award, Winner: Offices (2,000m2-10,000m2)
- The David Attenborough Building, Education, RIBA Journal Schüco Excellence Awards
- The David Attenborough Building, Commended, British Construction Industry Award (BCIA)
- Christies Care Office Building Winner (Large New Building), RIBA Suffolk Craftsmanship Award

2016

- The David Attenborough Building, Cambridge Design & Construction Awards: Best Conservation Alteration or Extension Award & Engineering & Sustainability Project of the Year
- Royal Opera House, Costume Centre Thurrock Business Awards, Best Community Charity Award

2015

- St Paul's School Science Building, RIBA London Award
- Gloucester Academy, Commendation, Gloucester Civic Award
- Kettering Science Academy, Commendation, Civic Trust Awards

2014

- Bishop of Rochester Academy Highly Commended, AJ100 Value Excellence Award
- Woodlands School Winner - BIM Initiative of the Year, Heating & Ventilation Awards
- St Paul's School Science Building Highly Commended - Design Through Innovation, (Royal Institution of Chartered Surveyors) RICS London Awards
- St Paul's School Science Building Winner, Civic Trust Awards
- GreenPark, Reading Winner, Civic Trust Award
- Noel-Baker and St Martins School Derby Civic Society, Commendation (Top Prize)
- Noel-Baker and St Martins School Winner, RIBA East Midlands Award

2013

- Dormers Wells High School Winner, Ealing Civic Society Award
- Joseph Chamberlain Sixth Form College Top 20 projects in the West Midlands, MADE20 Design Awards
- Nicholas Hare Architects Overall Winner, Open City Architecture in Schools Primary Awards
- Woodlands SchoolWinner (Building) BIM Project Application, British Construction Industry Awards
- Strood Academy Best New Build, Medway Culture & Design Award
- Alison Richard Building Commendation, Cambridge Design and Construction Awards

2012

- Royal Opera House Production Workshop, RIBA East Spirit of Ingenuity Award
- Crown Woods College, RIBA London Regional Award
- Crown Woods College, Civic Trust Awards Commendation
- Alison Richard Building, Civic Trust Awards Commendation

2011

- High House Production Park Project of the Year and Regeneration & Conservation Award, Royal Institution of Chartered Surveyors (RICS), South East Region 2011
- Coleridge Primary School Winner, Civic Trust Awards

2009

- Park Hall School in Solihull Winner - Excellence in BSF: Best Design for a New School (also shortlisted in the Innovation in Sustainability Award), Partnership for Schools
- O2 Headquarters building in Slough The Architecture Award Winner, International Property and Commercial Awards
- Best School Architect, British Council for School Environments
- Winner - Inspiring Design, British Council for School Environments - Golden Lane Campus

2007

- The Richard Doll Building, University of Oxford, RIBA Award
- Student Services Centre, University of Southampton, RIBA Award
