= Phyllis Deane =

British economic historian

Phyllis Mary Deane FBA (13 October 1918 – 28 July 2012) was a British economic historian and a historian of economic thought. She served as Professor of Economic History at the University of Cambridge from 1981 to 1983.

== Life and career ==
Deane was born in Hong Kong in October 1918, the daughter of an Admiralty engineer. She attended Chatham County School in Kent, then Hutchesons' Grammar School in Glasgow, before gaining a master's degree (MA) in Economic Science from the University of Glasgow in 1940. She later received an MA from the University of Cambridge.

Deane worked as a research officer, first at the National Institute of Economic and Social Research (NIESR) from 1941 to 1945, then at the Colonial Office until 1949. She left in 1950 for Cambridge University, where she was a researcher, then lecturer, in applied economics until 1971. She was then a reader in economic history until 1981, and Professor of Economic History from 1981 to 1983.

Among other academic honours, Deane was president of the Royal Economic Society from 1980 to 1982, a fellow of the British Academy, and was made an Honorary Doctor of Letters (DLitt) by Glasgow University in 1989. She was emeritus professor of economic history until her death in July 2012, aged 93. She never married.

== Publications ==
Deane contributed numerous papers and reviews to economic and other academic journals, and was editor of The Economic Journal from 1968 to 1975. Her books included British Economic Growth 1688–1959 (with W.A. "Max" Cole), which A. J. H. Latham described as "a milestone in British economic history, and indeed in economic history in general".

Her key works include:

- (1945) The Future of the Colonies, (with J. Huxley) London: Pilot Press.
- (1948) The Measurement of Colonial National Incomes. Cambridge: Cambridge University Press.
- (1953) Colonial Social Accounting. Cambridge: Cambridge University Press.
- (1962) British Economic Growth 1688–1959, (with W. A. Cole) Cambridge: Cambridge University Press.
- (1965) The First Industrial Revolution. Cambridge: Cambridge University Press.
- (1978) The Evolution of Economic Ideas. Cambridge: Cambridge University Press.
- (1989) The State and the Economic System. Oxford: Oxford University Press.
- (2001) The Life and Times of J. Neville Keynes: A Beacon in the Tempest. Cheltenham: Edward Elgar Publishing
