= Rainham, Kent =

Coordinates: 51.36°N 0.61°E

Rainham
- Town
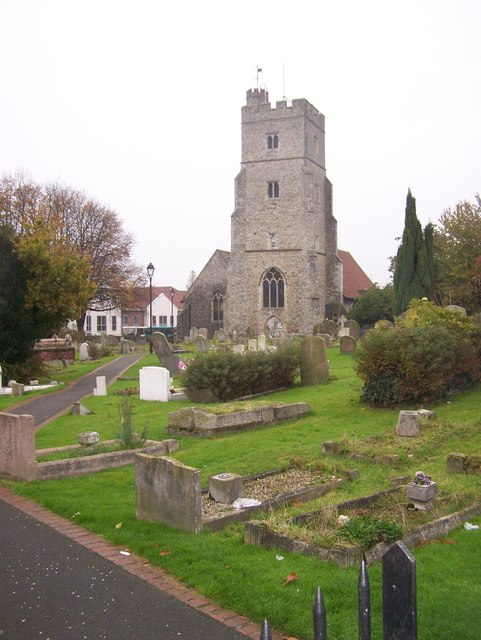
- St. Margaret's Church, Rainham

- Location within Kent
- Population: 34,088 (2011 census, Rainham North, Central and South wards)
- OS grid reference: TQ815655
- Unitary authority: Medway
- Ceremonial county: Kent
- Region: South East
- Country: England
- Sovereign state: United Kingdom
- Post town: GILLINGHAM
- Postcode district: ME7, ME8
- Dialling code: 01634
- Police: Kent
- Fire: Kent
- Ambulance: South East Coast
- UK Parliament: Gillingham and Rainham

Rainham (/ˈreɪnəm/ RAY-nəm) is a town in the unitary authority area of Medway, in the ceremonial county of Kent, England. The town forms a conurbation with neighbouring towns Chatham, Rochester, Strood and Gillingham. Historically, Rainham was a separate village which was absorbed into Gillingham in 1929, before becoming part of the Medway unitary authority in 1998.

== History ==
Historically, Rainham was a separate village. In 1921 the civil parish had a population of 4335. On 1 April 1929 the parish was abolished and merged with Gillingham and became part of the Municipal Borough of Gillingham, which was originally created in 1903 and was grouped with the latter's built-up area in analysis of the 2011 census by the Office for National Statistics. It became part of the Medway authority when Gillingham was incorporated with the other towns to form Medway Unitary Authority in 1998. Rainham is now one of the five distinct towns of Medway, alongside Rochester, Chatham, Gillingham and Strood.

== Geography ==
Rainham occupies a large stretch of land from the dip slope of a moderate rise of the North Downs of about 125 m (410 ft) above sea level, descending to a frontage on the River Medway's natural harbour to the north.

London is approximately 39 miles (63 km) to the west.

Three roads cross the town. The M2 motorway runs along its southern edge, two miles (3.2 km) from the town centre. The main road through the town, the A2, follows the ancient Watling Street, the Roman road between London and Canterbury. The most northerly road runs close to the southern bank of the river. The Chatham Main Line has a railway station here and National Cycle Route 1 runs through the town.

The Park Wood estate to the south of Rainham was built mainly during the 1960s and 1970s. Building this estate required the destruction of one of the last large areas of relict woodland in North Kent. The area towards Gillingham is known as Rainham Mark, named after an old ecclesiastical boundary: and Macklands is an older part of the town to the north. The Macklands Arms public house was named after Macklands Manor House. The (now Grade II listed,) manor house was home to members of the Mackay family, who owned a printing company in Chatham. The company building is now part of CPi Books. Lower Rainham, once a separate village, is now also a part of the town.

== Demographics ==
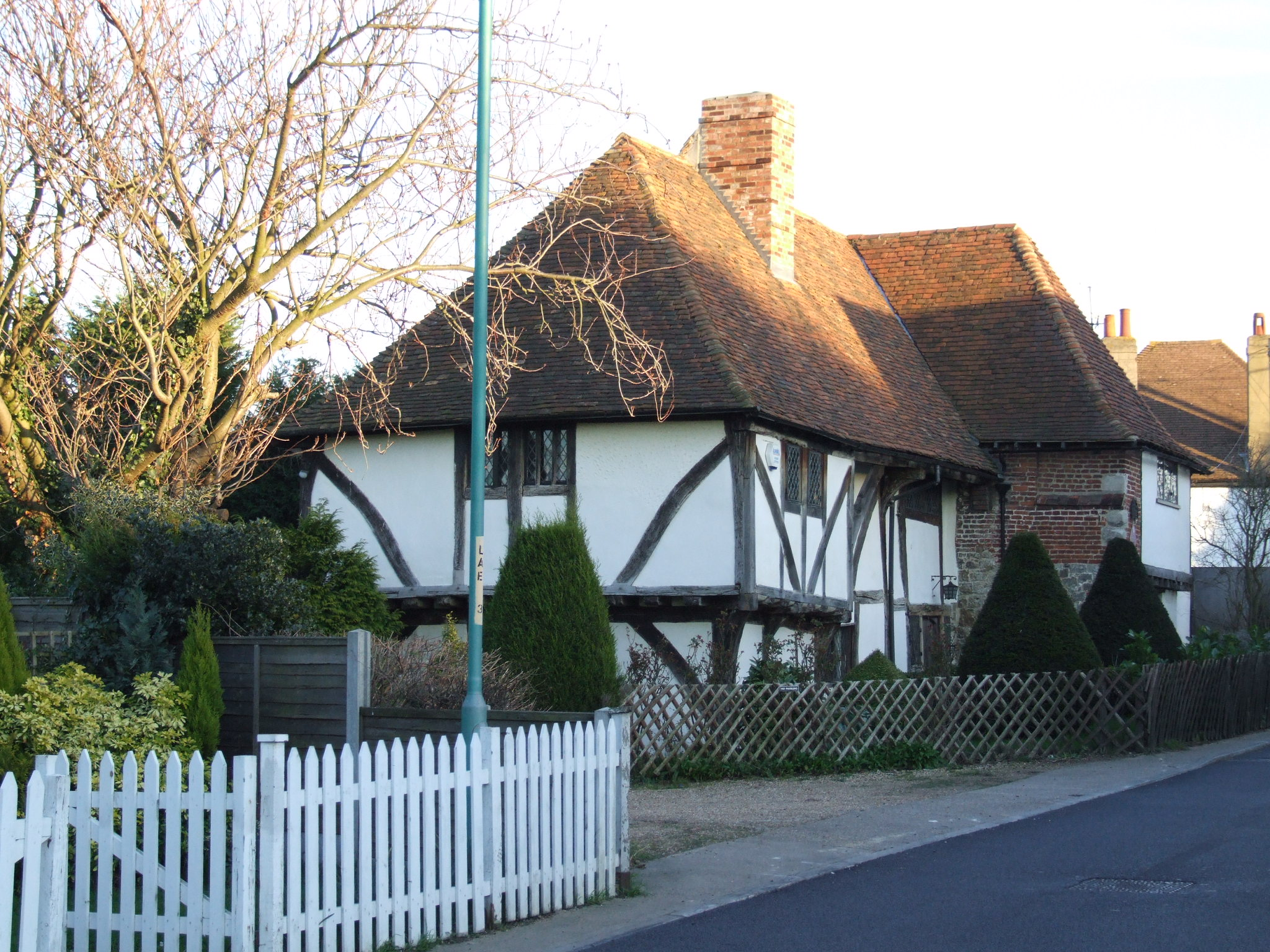
Lower Rainham Road

Rainham was originally a linear settlement along the main road. The population in 1801 was 422; two centuries later it is well over thirty thousand. Part of the reason for this huge growth can be attributed to the railway. When the railway came in 1858 it brought an almost immediate increase in the size of the village; when the Chatham Main Line was electrified in 1959, as with all the places served by it, town growth began again. One of the results was the building of Parkwood estate (see above).

== Amenities ==
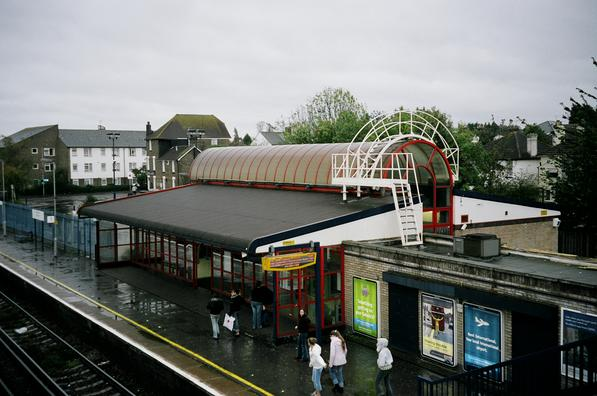
Rainham station

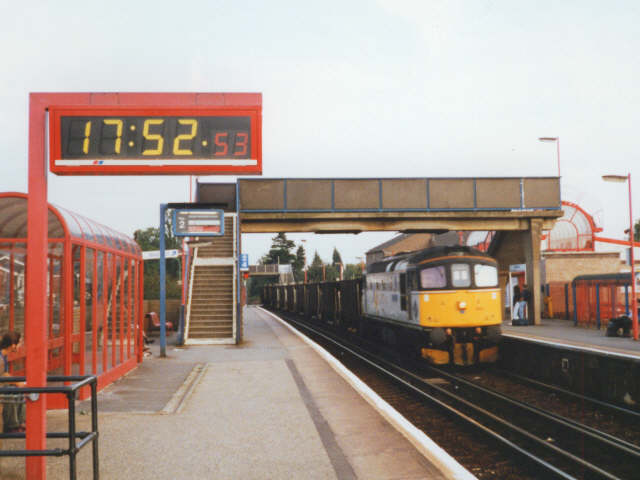
Rainham station in 1992

The parish church is dedicated to St Margaret; the Roman Catholic church to St Thomas of Canterbury.

== Facilities ==
Rainham has a small shopping area, including the Rainham Shopping Centre precinct, with a few major shops. The precinct was built in the 1970s after the old church school building was demolished. The school originally opened in 1846 it was a community centre for the last few years of its life. The school (St Margaret's) had moved to the old senior school building in Orchard Street in 1967.

Rainham is home to the first ever oast house theatre, where the Rainham Theatrical Society (RaTS) puts on regular performances.

The Oast Community Centre is another oast house that has been redesigned for a new purpose. It is situated next door to Rainham train station, and is independently run by the Rainham & Wigmore Community Association. The facility hosts many events, mainly to help benefit the local community, with activities such as afternoon teas, dancing and choirs. The venue has also hosted music events with names such as Bez, from the Happy Mondays, and Tom Meighan of Kasabian using the venue.

== Local media ==
=== Newspapers ===
Local newspapers for Rainham include the Medway Messenger, published by the KM Group. The area also has free newspapers in the Medway Extra (KM Group) and yourmedway (KOS Media).
In 2011 Medway News and Medway Standard, both published by Kent Regional News and Media were closed.

=== Television ===
Local news and television programmes are provided by BBC South East and ITV Meridian. Television signals are received from the Bluebell Hill TV transmitter.

=== Radio ===
The local commercial radio station for Rainham is KMFM Medway, owned by the KM Group. Medway is also served by community radio station Radio Sunlight. The area can also receive the county wide stations BBC Radio Kent, Heart South and Smooth.

== Education ==
Rainham has four secondary schools:

- The Howard School: a selective and secondary school for boys
- Rainham Mark Grammar School: selective school for which the Medway Test has to be taken, open to both boys and girls
- Rainham School for Girls: a comprehensive school for girls
- Leigh Academy Rainham: a comprehensive school for girls and boys

For a full list of schools serving Rainham visit List of schools in Medway

== Open spaces ==
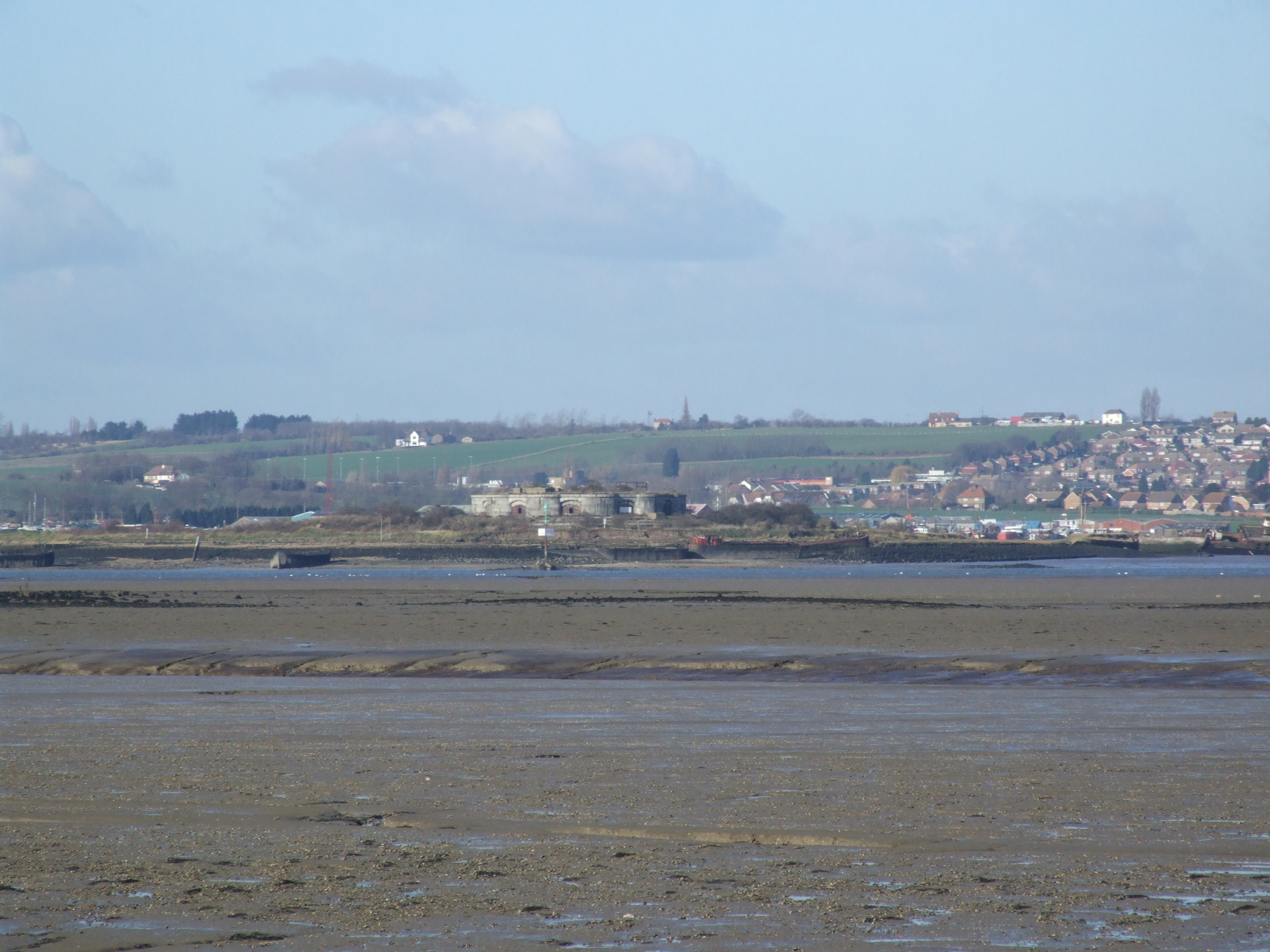
Looking across the Medway from Horrid Hill, Riverside Country Park.

The Riverside Country Park, which fronts on to the river Medway at Rainham Creek, includes the promontory of Horrid Hill. Berengrave Local Nature Reserve (a disused chalk pit) is located on the Lower Rainham Road.

There are also a number of parks and recreational grounds around Rainham.
