= The Victory Academy =

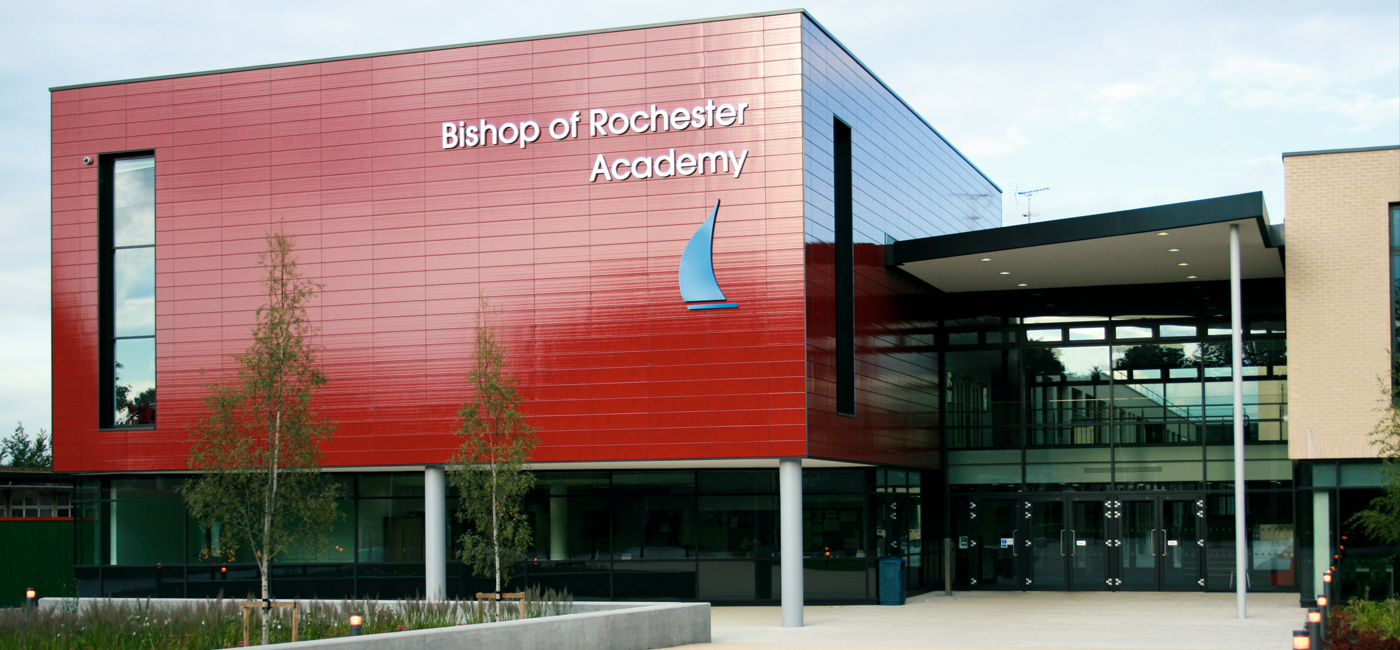

Location
- Magpie Hall Road; Chatham, Kent, ME4 5JB; England
- Coordinates: 51.3677°N 0.5314°E

Information
- Type: Academy
- Established: 30 September 2015
- Trust: Thinking Schools Academy Trust UID= 5049
- Department for Education URN: 136108 Tables
- Ofsted: Reports
- Principal: Oliver Owen
- CEO: S Gardner
- Gender: Mixed
- Age: 11 to 18
- Enrolment: 846 as of January 2015
- Former School Names: Medway Community College, Chatham South School, Bishop of Rochester's Academy
- Website: www.thevictoryacademy.org.uk

The Victory Academy (formerly Bishop of Rochester Academy and Medway Community College) is a mixed secondary school and sixth form located in Chatham in the English county of Kent.

== History ==
Bishop of Rochesters Academy was formed in 2010 with the merging of Medway Community College or MCC, with Chatham South. MCC had previously been Fort Luton High School for Boys and Christchurch High School(girls). It changed its name to The Victory Academy when it severed its ties with the Church of England, and was refactored into the Thinking Schools Academy Trust in May 2015

== Governance ==
Medway Community College was a community school directly controlled by Medway Council. The school converted into a Church of England academy in September 2010, and was renamed Bishop of Rochester Academy. The school was sponsored by the Diocese of Rochester, Canterbury Christ Church University and Medway Council. In 2015 the academy changed its name due to severing ties with the Church of England, and is now sponsored by the Thinking Schools Academy Trust.

== The building ==
It is located on Magpie Hall Road, at the crest of dry valley that cuts the chalkland, this constrains the site which still had to host the old school during construction. The school was designed by Nicholas Hare Architects using the same construction techniques at Hare's other two Medway buildings: Brompton Academy and Strood Academy.

The Victory Academy is built around a central courtyard with a range of outdoor spaces used for performance and teaching. The building is constructed from prefabricated sections. These include brick-clad pre-cast concrete sandwich panels for external walls, pre-cast columns and pre-cast floor planks.

== Curriculum ==
The Victory Academy offers GCSEs and BTECs as programmes of study for pupils, while students in the sixth form have the option to study from a range of A Levels and further BTECs. The school also operates a grammar school stream for academically gifted pupils.
