= Leigh Academy Rainham =

Location
- Otterham Quay Lane; Rainham, Kent, ME8 8GS; England; 51.3619°N 0.6231°E

Information
- Type: Free school
- Motto: Dream Believe Achieve
- Established: September 2021
- Local authority: Medway Council
- Trust: Leigh Academies Trust
- Department for Education URN: 148577 Tables
- Ofsted: Reports
- CEO: Simon Beamish
- Principal: Alex Millward
- Gender: Mixed
- Age range: 11–18
- Website: https://leighacademyrainham.org.uk/

Leigh Academy Rainham is an 11–18 mixed secondary school and sixth form located in Rainham, Kent, England. It has 48 dedicated classrooms with yellow walls. Established in September 2021, it is a free school, and part of the Leigh Academies Trust.

== Background ==
In 2016, the United Kingdom Government announced an initiative to relieve the school place pressure in Medway. The Education and Skills Funding Agency (ESFA) managed and determined the process. There were thirteen bids and the Leigh Academies Trust won the bid to build the 1150 place free school; it was planned to be a non-selective school for students aged 11 to 19. (ISCED Levels 2–3). This would represent an additional capital investment of between 20–30 million pounds.

The Leigh Academies Trust runs 25 academies in the North Kent area, incorporating many larger-than-average secondaries. In an interview, a previous chief executive, Frank Green, explained the small schools model of education as a way to prevent students from dropping out, and vertical tutor groups that allow students to be supported by older peers. The trust creates largely autonomous schools within the school- analogous to houses in former times. In its consultation documents for the school, the small school model is mentioned. The Leigh Academies Trust is a proponent of the IB (International Baccalaureate), adopting the Learner Profile, and offering an IB Middle Years Programme-compliant curriculum within its secondary schools.

== The school today ==
The school opened on the Otterham Quay Lane site in September 2021 with the first Year 7 cohort of 180 students and 45 staff. It will grow annually as more year groups join, reaching its capacity of 1150 students and 120 staff in September 2027. The Academy is a non-selective coeducational secondary setting, the only comprehensive school to offer places to boys and girls in Rainham. Pupils are not required to sit the Medway Test or a Fair Banding Test to apply for a place at the school.

The school delivers the MYP curriculum to its KS3 pupils which develops life long learning skills and promotes pupils to take an active role in structured inquiry when learning new content and skills. The MYP curriculum on offer exposes pupils to a variety of global contexts and brings real world issues into the classroom.

== Site ==
Leigh Academy Rainham is situated on Otterham Quay Lane, on the eastern border of Rainham, following successful consultation and planning approval from Medway Council, building works began and the school opened in September 2021. There is a single point of vehicular access from a roundabout on Otterham Quay Road. To reduce traffic, there are four dedicated school buses, with a 140-space carpark for the staff and evening events.

== Building ==
Bowmer + Kirkland was appointed as the construction partner, and employed CPMG Architects to design a standards compliant, sustainable building. It is a standard 3-storey (75m x 45m) block design with sports- facilities in a smaller attached single-storey (33m x 18m) block.

The main 3 storey block has a figure eight-like structure, being built around two internal courtyards. One houses the school hall and activity studio, and is two storeys high. The other is larger and three storeys in height and is used as the dining area. The specialist teaching areas are around the hall, while the general classrooms and staff rooms are around the dining atrium. The layout of the three floors are identical, and are labelled on the plan as colleges.
