= Chatham Grammar School for Girls =

School in Kent, England

Chatham Grammar
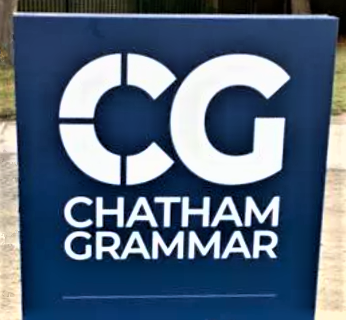
- Sign at school entrance

Location
- Rainham Road; Chatham/Gillingham, Kent, ME5 7EH; England; 51.37382°N 0.54842°E

Information
- Type: Grammar school, Academy
- Motto: Honour before Honours (since 1935); Each for all (1909–35)
- Established: 1907
- Trust: University of Kent Academies Trust UID: 16829
- Department for Education URN: 137389 Tables
- Ofsted: Reports
- Head teacher: Wendy Walters
- Staff: 68
- Gender: Girls, mixed 6th form
- Age: 11 to 18
- Enrolment: Approximately 950
- Website: www.chathamgrammar.org.uk

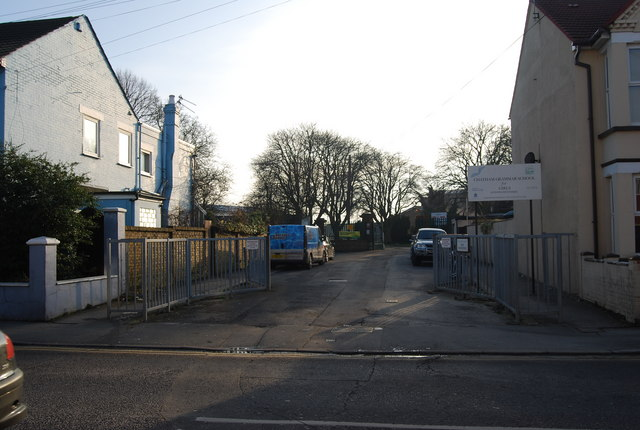
Entrance to school in 2009

Chatham Grammar School for Girls ("CGSG") is a girls grammar school with academy status and a mixed sixth form. In September 2017 it became a member school of the University of Kent Academies Trust (UKAT), joined with another secondary school, Brompton Academy.
Since 2019 it has described itself as Chatham Grammar School on its website and signage, reflecting the presence of boys on the sixth form roll.

== The current school ==
The school is in Medway in Kent, on the Rainham Road (A2), just inside the parish of St Augustine, Gillingham on the Chatham – Gillingham boundary.

In 2023 there were approximately 950 students, (compared with a capacity of 976), including about 202 in the mixed sixth form, and 68 teaching staff. Mrs Wendy Walters was appointed principal in 2017, taking over from Mr Storey.

The school holds an annual Christmas service in the St Augustine parish church, situated opposite the school.

== History ==
=== Chatham County School for Girls (1907–1944) ===
The school, then called the Chatham County School for Girls, was founded in January 1907. There was no school building and rooms were rented at the Chatham Technical Institute. In addition to headmistress Miss Constance Wakeman, the school had ten teachers, four of whom were part-time.

The new school building, on the current site, was formally opened in February 1913. The school taught girls aged 8 to 18 years, those under 11 in a separate preparatory department. There was an entrance examination and, although maintained by the local authority, fees were payable. Scholarships were available for poorer families, with the number of fee payers diminishing in the inter-war years. The curriculum was mainly academic, but included more practical subjects including needlework and domestic science.

The school roll expanded from under 130 in 1912 to over 400 by 1920, and more accommodation was required. An extension was completed in 1931, nearly doubling the size of the building. The newly expanded school could accommodate 480 girls, a figure that would have been reached in September 1939. However, with the outbreak of the Second World War, the school evacuated, first to Faversham in East Kent and then, in May 1940, to Pontypridd in South Wales. Most girls returned to the Medway towns by late 1941, and the school reopened.

=== Chatham Grammar School for Girls (since 1944) ===
The Education Act 1944 led to a major restructure of secondary education. The school became the Chatham Grammar School for Girls, all fees were abolished and the preparatory department – already undersubscribed – closed. Entrants were selected by the eleven-plus exam.

With the school roll now over 500, and increasing to over 800 by the 1990s, further expansion was required, with a number of new blocks built on the site from the mid 1950s. More girls remained into the 6th form, with over 130 in 1970 and 280 in 2007, compared with under 40 during the 1930s.

The first male teacher was appointed in 1958. He was Don Summerley who taught Biology, followed in 1959 by James Nicholson, who taught Religious Education. By the end of the 1960s a quarter of the staff were male.

The school's centenary was celebrated in 2006–2007 with the release of 1,000 balloons and a school fete, with many other smaller events through the year. A mosaic was designed by artist Jo Letchford incorporating the school's ship emblem and the dates 1907-2007 to commemorate the centenary. All pupils and staff had the opportunity to place a tessera into the mosaic before it was mounted on the wall outside reception. A record exists linking each tessera with the person who placed it into the design.

=== Recent years ===
The number of students has fluctuated in recent years, with nearly 1,000 in 2007, dropping to under 800 in 2012 and 620 in 2016, but increasing to over 700 by 2018 and 800 in 2021. This compares with a capacity of 976. As a consequence of the fall in popularity of the school and the resulting lower numbers, there were several rounds of staff redundancies. In 2020 a new teaching block was built, enabling the sixth form intake to increase to 200.

Adding on, they have also turned into a mixed school during recent years

From 1919 to late 1950s, the school had a company of Girl Guides, Chief Guide Lady Baden Powell visiting the school in 1949. In 2018 a Combined Cadet Force contingent was set up at the school.

== Academic performance ==
Ofsted, in their four full inspections between 2003 and 2018, consistently rated the school as 'Good'.

== Notable former students ==
- Lisa Andreas, aged 16, came joint-fifth (with Sweden) in the Eurovision Song Contest 2004, representing Cyprus singing Stronger Every Minute
- Rehman Chishti, MP for Gillingham and Rainham was a sixth form student
- Phyllis Deane, Professor of Economic History from 1981–83 at the University of Cambridge, and President from 1980–82 of the Royal Economic Society
- Helen Rappaport née Ware, historian
- (Carol) Mickey Walker OBE, professional golfer
- Lorna Wing OBE, née Tolchard, psychiatrist
