= Leigh Academy =

Sir Geoffrey Leigh Academy
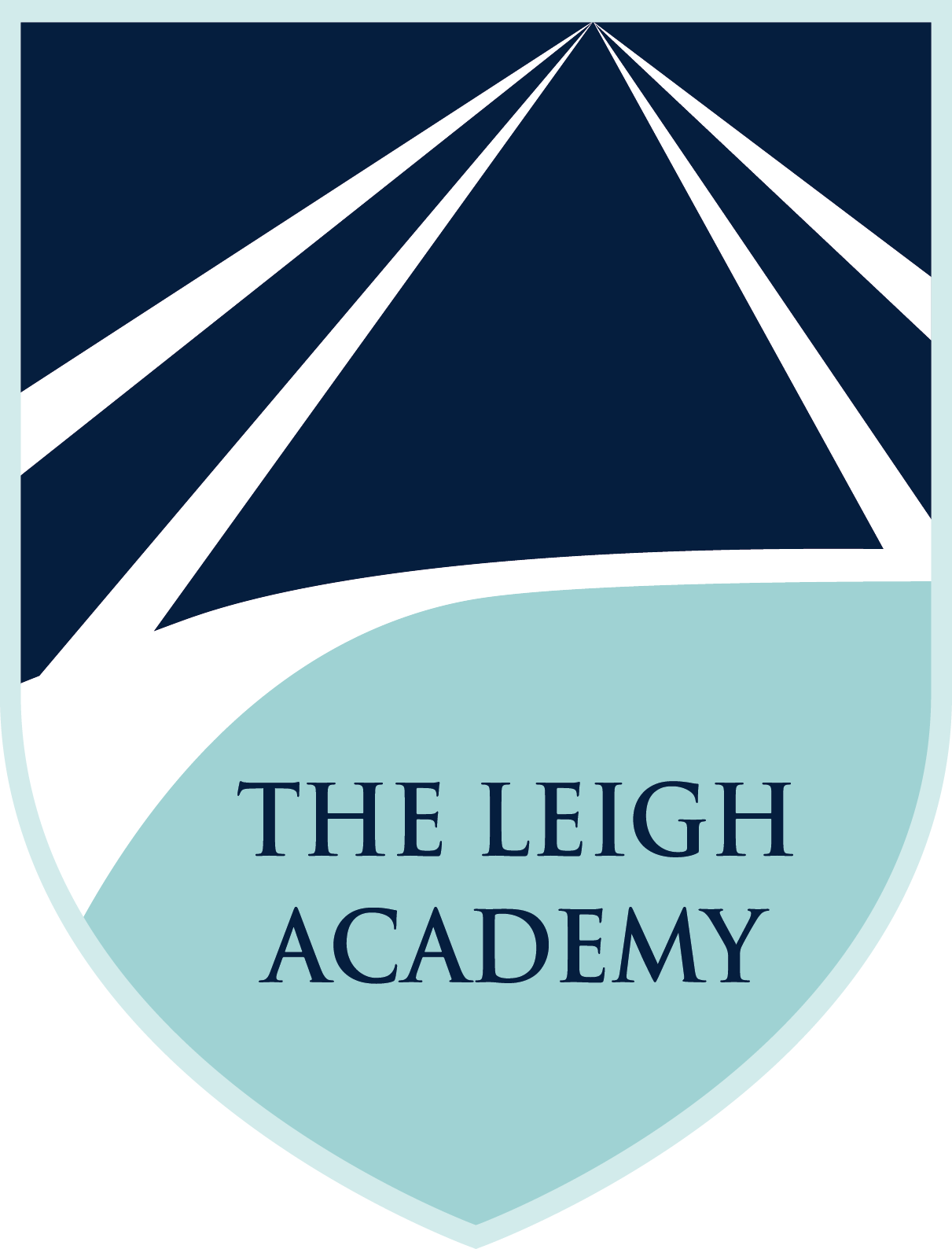

Location
- Green Street Green Road; Dartford, Kent, DA1 1QE; England; 51°26′13″N 0°14′06″E

Information
- Former names: The Leigh Academy; The Downs School; The Leigh City Technology College
- Type: Academy
- Motto: Opening Minds to Success
- Established: 2007; 19 years ago
- Founder: Sir Geoffrey Leigh
- Local authority: Kent
- Trust: Leigh Academies Trust
- Department for Education URN: 135297 Tables
- Ofsted: Reports
- Principal: Ms Gurjit Kaur Shergill
- Gender: Mixed
- Age: 11 to 19
- Enrolment: 1,465
- Houses: Shakespeare Mandela; Curie; Seacole Attenborough
- Website: www.sirgeoffreyleighacademy.org.uk

Sir Geoffrey Leigh Academy (SGLA), formerly known as The Leigh Academy, is named after its founding sponsor, Sir Geoffrey Leigh. The academy was renamed in September 2024 as part of a rebranding initiative by its governing body, the multi-academy trust known as Leigh Academies Trust. The trust's CEO, Simon Beamish, previously served as principal of The Leigh Academy, succeeding Frank Green.

Before its academisation in 2007, The Leigh Academy was known as Leigh City Technology College and held City Technology College status from 1997 to 2007. Prior to this, it was known as The Downs School.

== History ==
Dartford East Secondary Modern School was built in the 1930s as two schools for boys and girls on both sides of Green Street Green Road on East Hill in Dartford. The name was changed to the Downs Secondary Modern School for Boys, and the Downs Secondary Girls School and then simply The Downs. The girls school was rebuilt in the 1970s, by Howard Lobb and Partners for Kent County Council. Greenstraete indicates the site of an overgrown Roman road.

The Leigh Academy occupies the former site of the Downs secondary school. In 1990 it became the Leigh City Technology College when it opened as one of the original 15 City Technology Colleges. In September 2007, The Leigh became an academy. In May 2013, the Academy's Ofsted ratings were reduced from outstanding to good.

== Academy ==
In January 2008 students and staff moved into the new school. The official opening of the academy took place on 20 June 2008, led by Lord Coe.

The academy is split into five colleges: Shakespeare, Seacole, Curie, Mandela and Attenborough. Each College has its own Head of College and Assistant Head of College.
