= Leigh Academies Trust =

Multi-academy trust in the United Kingdom

- Established: 2008
- Type: Multi Academy Trust
- Location: Carnation Road, Strood, Rochester. ME2 2SX
- Key people: Frank Green, Simon Beamish
- Website: leighacademiestrust.org.uk

Leigh Academies Trust is a multi-academy trust, formed of 31 schools based in the Kent, Medway and South East London areas. Its head office is on the same site as Strood Academy, housing its executive team and central teams including finance, estates, marketing, HR, engagement and IT.

Trust subsidiaries include LAT Apprenticeships, which runs apprenticeship schemes, and LAT Enterprises, which generates income which is fed back into the trust's academies.

== History ==
Leigh Academies Trust was formed in 2008, linking the Leigh Academy and Longfield Academy, under a single governing body with Frank Green CBE as chief executive. In November 2013 Simon Beamish was appointed as chief executive, replacing Green who was appointed National Schools Commissioner by the Department for Education.

Over the next ten years the trust grew, and in January 2019 merged with The Williamson Trust, absorbing five additional schools.

== Schools ==
Leigh Academies Trust oversees:

=== North Kent Cluster ===
- Cherry Orchard Primary Academy
- Dartford Primary Academy
- Hartley Primary Academy
- Leigh Academy
- Leigh Academy Minster
- The Leigh UTC
- Longfield Academy
- Milestone Academy
- Wilmington Academy

=== Medway Cluster ===
- Ebbsfleet Academy
- High Halstow Primary Academy
- The Hundred of Hoo Academy
- Leigh Academy Rainham
- Peninsula East Primary Academy
- Sir Joseph Williamson's Mathematical School
- Strood Academy

=== Central Kent Cluster ===
- Bearsted Primary Academy
- Horsmonden Primary Academy
- Langley Park Primary Academy
- Hugh Christie School
- Leigh Academy Tonbridge
- Marden Primary Academy
- Mascalls Academy
- Molehill Primary Academy
- Oaks Primary Academy
- Paddock Wood Primary Academy
- Leigh Academy Snowfields
- Tree Tops Primary Academy

=== South East London Cluster ===
- Eastcote Primary Academy
- The Halley Academy
- Leigh Academy Bexley
- Leigh Academy Blackheath
- Leigh Academy Limehouse
- Leigh Stationers' Academy

=== Future ===
As of June 2022 there no announced plans to open new academies or take on existing schools, however there are plans to convert High Weald Academy to an extension of Snowfields Academy from September 2022.

Also planned is the conversion of Hayesbrook Academy to a coeducational school, to include girls, from September 2023. The academy will then be rebranded Leigh Academy Tonbridge.
