= Parkwood, Medway =

Housing estate in Gillingham, Kent, England

Coordinates: 51.34651°N 0.59853°E

Parkwood: Parkwood
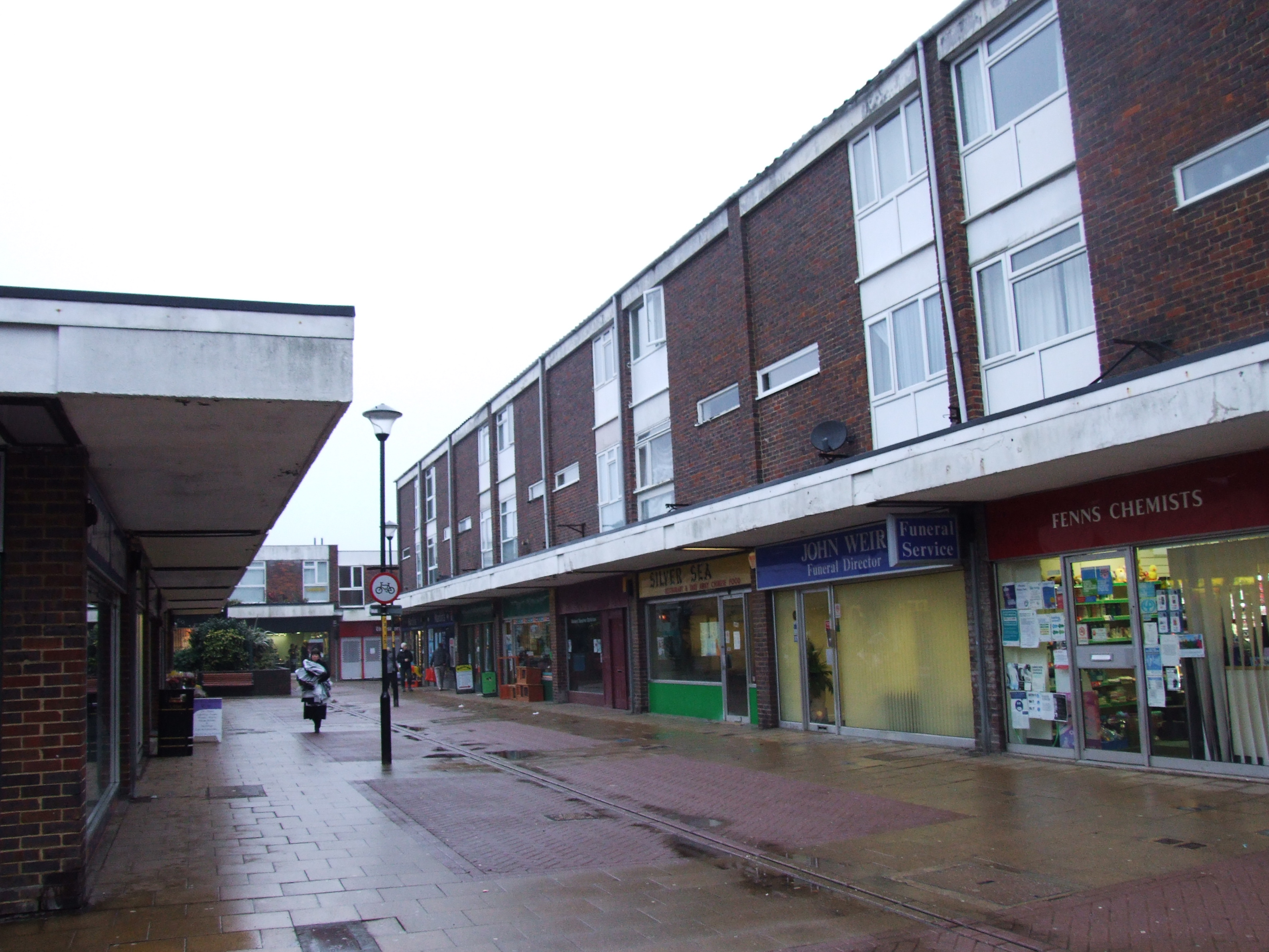
- Parkwood shopping centre

- Location within Kent
- OS grid reference: TQ811638
- Unitary authority: Medway
- Ceremonial county: Kent
- Region: South East
- Country: England
- Sovereign state: United Kingdom
- Post town: GILLINGHAM
- Postcode district: ME7, ME8
- Dialling code: 01634
- Police: Kent
- Fire: Kent
- Ambulance: South East Coast
- UK Parliament: Gillingham and Rainham

Parkwood or Park Wood is a housing estate and district in Gillingham at the south-eastern corner of the Medway conurbation in Kent, England. It was built mainly during the 1960s and 1970s, largely by Ward Homes, and originally called Rainham Park.

Parkwood is bordered by Wigmore to the west, Rainham to the north, and the M2 motorway to the south. It is within the Rainham South council ward.

== Amenities ==
St. Paul's Church sits in the centre of Parkwood, and is the main landmark of the area, standing near to the adjacent shopping centre. The timber and metal church was consecrated in October 1998.

Parkwood is home to Parkwood Primary School, situated on Deanwood Drive, which provides education for children aged 4-11. The school was burned down from a fire in February 1979. Other communal facilities in Parkwood include the Parkwood Youth Club, and Parkwood Social Club & Community Centre, which is run by the Parkwood Community Association.

Foxburrow Wood also sits on Deanwood Drive. A 6.1-hectare (15-acre) protected Local Nature Reserve which is owned and managed by Medway Council. What remains of Foxburrow Wood is remnant of a much larger historic wood, which once covered the entirety of what is now Parkwood, and has flora which are indicators of ancient woodland such as herb paris and bluebells.

== Sport ==
Parkwood Community Association ran a football team until 2021, under the PCA name, who played at Luton Recreation Ground in Chatham, and competed in the Rochester & District Football League. The team won 3 league titles during their tenure; winning the Division 2 title in 2012-13, the Division 3 title in 2016-17, and eventually the Premier Division title in their final season in 2020-21.

The social club also run a darts team.
