= The Ebbsfleet Academy =

Location
- Southfleet Road; Swanscombe, Kent, DA10 0BZ; England; 51.4415°N 0.3126°E

Information
- Type: Academy
- Established: 1 November 2013
- Local authority: Kent County Council
- Trust: Leigh Academy Trust
- Department for Education URN: 137581 Tables
- Ofsted: Reports
- Principal: Gurjit Kaur Shergill
- Gender: Coeducational
- Age: 11 to 18
- Enrolment: 700 as of September 2024
- Website: https://ebbsfleet.academy/

Leigh Academy Ebbsfleet (formerly Swan Valley Community School, and Ebbsfleet Academy) is a coeducational secondary school with academy status, located in Swanscombe, in the English county of Kent.

The school converted to academy status on 1 November 2013 and was renamed The Ebbsfleet Academy. Until 2021 the school was sponsored by The Brook Learning Trust, but it was previously a community school administered by Kent County Council. However The Ebbsfleet Academy continues to coordinate with Kent County Council for admissions. It was taken on by the Leigh Academies Trust in 2021. In 2025, the school renamed to Leigh Academy Ebbsfleet following joining the Leigh Academies Trust.

Leigh Academy Ebbsfleet is a Middle Years Program Certified school.

Leigh Academy Ebbsfleet offers GCSEs and BTECs as programmes of study for pupils. The school is located at a community campus which includes a health Centre, library and pharmacy and is adjacent to the Manor Primary School.
