= Howard School, Kent =

The Howard School

Location
- Derwent Way; Rainham, Kent, ME8 0BX; England; 51.363°N 0.593°E

Information
- Type: Academy with Sixth Form
- Mottoes: " Be Good, Be Kind, Be Hardworking; High Standards lead to High Achievement"
- Established: 1975
- Local authority: Medway
- Trust: The Howard Academies Trust UID: 16042
- Department for Education URN: 141466 Tables
- Ofsted: Reports
- CEO: Owen McColgan
- Head of School: Jasbinder Johal
- Gender: Male (Mixed sixth form)
- Age: 11 to 18
- Enrolment: 1,500 pupils
- Houses: Attenborough, Pankhurst, Tull, Hawking, Turing
- Website: http://www.thehowardschool.co.uk

The Howard School is a boys' secondary school in Rainham, Kent, England, with approximately 1,500 pupils. It offers a partially selective system and is one of a few dozen bi-lateral schools in the United Kingdom. The partially selective system permits admission to the grammar school section by the 11-Plus selection, however a passing mark is not required if the pupil is seen to have the ability to work in the 'grammar stream', and non-selective admission to the high school. The school is a Sports College.

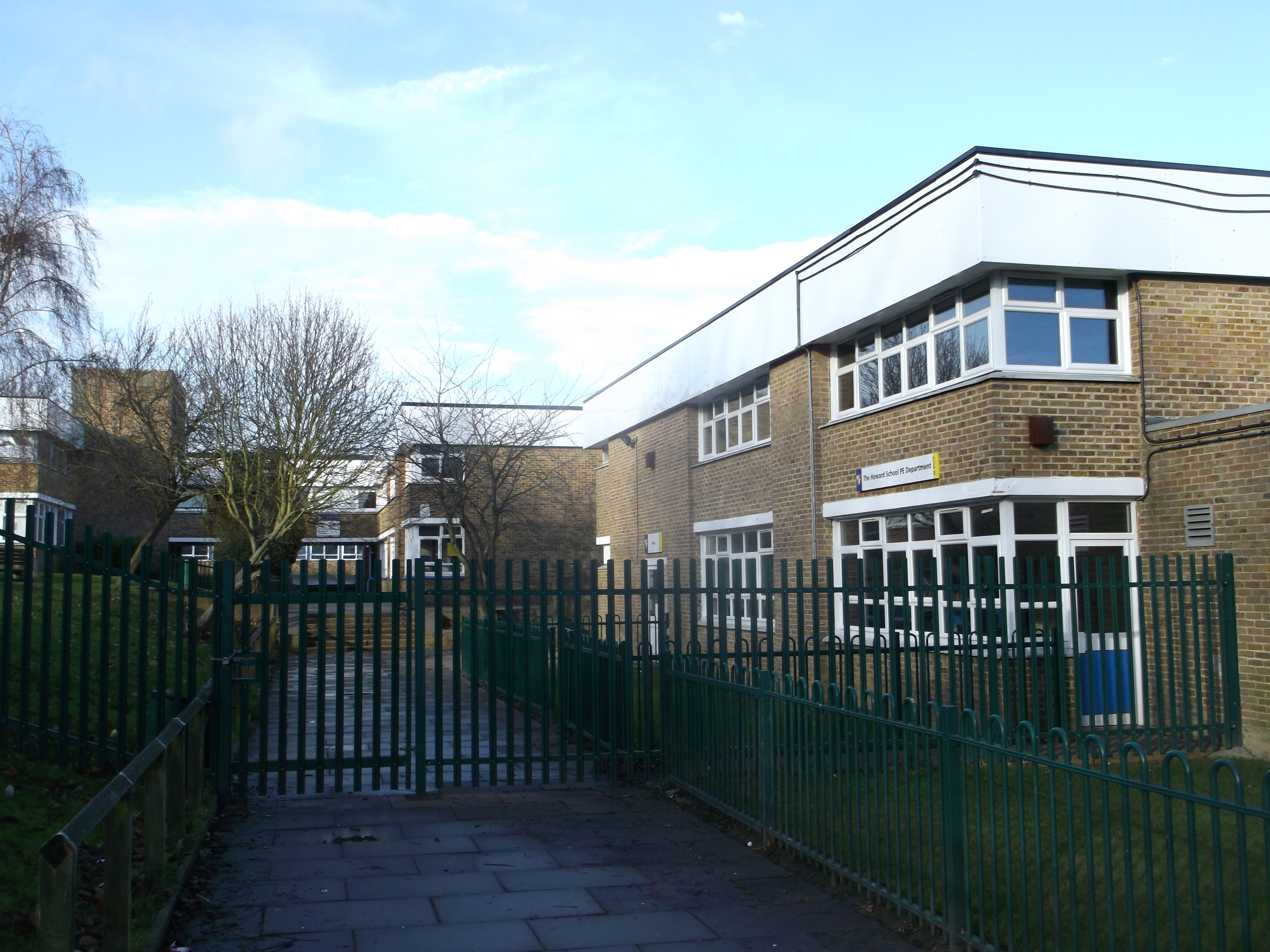
Buildings at the Howard School

== History ==
The school was named after Dorothy Howard, who played a major part in the local community, and was established in 1975 by amalgamating Rainham Boys' Secondary School and Gillingham Boys' Grammar School to form a bi-lateral school.

The Howard School became a grant-maintained school in 1994 when it left the control of Kent County Council. Following a change of central government it became a foundation school in 1998. Although a foundation school, the school works closely with Medway Council, which, since becoming a unitary authority in 1998, oversees education in the Medway Towns.

The school became a Specialist Sports College in 2007.

Also in 2007, a confidential Howard School report book, intended to highlight "additional educational needs" of some students, was found on lying on a pavement in Rainham. Explicit instructions were printed on the front: "Do not leave lying around." In the report, teachers described some students in uncomplimentary terms such as "dingbat," "away with the fairies," and "quite rough;" and some parents in terms such as "unsuitable" and "lazy." The deputy head teacher of Howard School, Bill Edgar, said “We very much regret that a highly confidential document about our students had got into the public domain. We are urgently reviewing our procedures to ensure that this does not occur again."

In 2008, 2013, and 2016, The Howard School received a "good" rating from Ofsted inspectors. This is a change since 2002, when Ofsted inspectors gave a "Serious weaknesses" rating.

== The Howard Academy Trust ==
The school converted to academy status in October 2014 and further converted to Multi-Academy Trust status in December 2015. Temple Mill Primary School, Strood, joined the Trust at the same time as the conversion to MAT and Deanwood Primary School, Parkwood, Rainham, joined the Trust in September 2016.

Waterfront UTC, formerly Medway UTC, a University technical college in Chatham, joined the Trust in 2018.

=== Sports College ===
The school is a Sports College. Since becoming a Sports College, the school has developed its sporting facilities, including:

- Building a "5 a-side" football complex
- Building a library and improving ICT facilities
- Renovating the sports blocks, changing facilities and sports halls
- Developing one of the best table tennis centres in the UK, used during the prelude to the London 2012 Olympic Games by various national teams, located at the top of the school grounds.

== Notable former pupils ==
- Derek Hales, footballer
- Luis Binks, footballer

=== Howard School ===
- Gary Rhodes, chef
- Douglas Hodge, actor

=== Gillingham Boys' Grammar School ===
- David Frost, broadcaster
- David Harvey, geographer

== See also ==
- Gillingham School (also former Gillingham Grammar School) in Gillingham, Dorset.
