= Leigh Academy Strood =

Secondary school in Strood, England

Location
- Carnation Road; Strood, Kent, ME2 2SX; England; 51.3978°N 0.4658°E

Information
- Type: Academy
- Trust: Leigh Academies Trust
- Department for Education URN: 135964 Tables
- Ofsted: Reports
- Principal: Jon Richardson
- Gender: Coeducational
- Age: 11 to 19
- Enrolment: 1305
- Capacity: 1500
- Website: leighacademystrood.org.uk

Leigh Academy Strood, formerly Strood Academy, is a coeducational secondary school and sixth form, with academy status, in Strood in the English county of Kent. Part of the main building also serves as the head office for Leigh Academies Trust.

== History ==
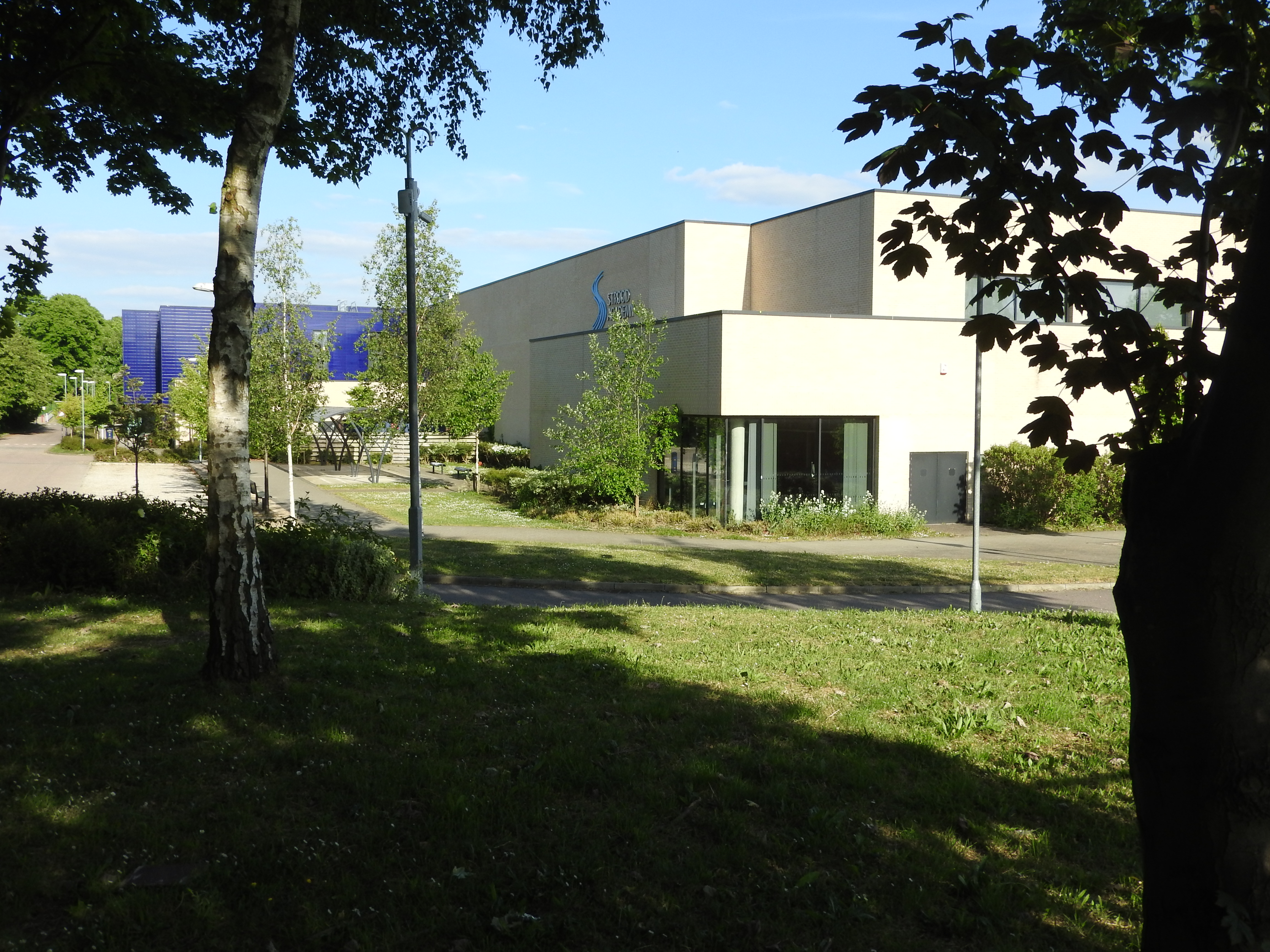
Strood Academy in May 2020

Leigh Academy Strood was formed in September 2009 as Strood Academy, following the closure of Chapter School and Temple School, and today the school is located on the former site of Chapter School. The school moved into new buildings on the site in September 2012, which were designed in partnership with Nicholas Hare Architects and built by BAM as the main contractor at a cost of £27 million. The academy moved into the Leigh Academies Trust in 2017. The school officially adopted the name Leigh Academy Strood from September 2025 as part of the Leigh Academies Trust-wide rebranding.

Dijana Piralic became Principal, replacing Kim Gunn, in March 2020. In April 2023, Jon Richardson became Principal.

== Governance ==
Leigh Academy Strood is part of the Leigh Academies Trust, a multi-academy trust, formed of 25 schools based in the Kent, Medway and South East London areas. Within the Trust's head office, it houses its Executive Team and the other central teams including Finance, Business, Marketing, HR, Engagement and IT.

Leigh Academy Strood was sponsored by the University for the Creative Arts in 2013.

== Academics ==
=== Key Stage 3 ===
Leigh Academy Strood is a candidate school for the IB Middle Years Programme. In addition to following the UK National curriculum, this "a commitment to improve the teaching and learning of a diverse and inclusive community of students by delivering challenging, high quality programmes of international education that share a powerful vision."

=== Key Stage 4 ===
The school offers GCSEs and BTECs as programmes of study for its pupils; while students in the sixth form have the option to study from a range of A Levels and BTEC Level 3s. In 2018, 5% of year 11s had entries in all EBACC subjects.

== Sports ==
When the school was designed in 2011, sports facilities were included that could be let out of hours. A spin off company now does this too. There are multi-use sports spaces, a dance studio, tennis/netball courts and all-weather pitches.
