= History of Rochester, Kent =

History of a town in England

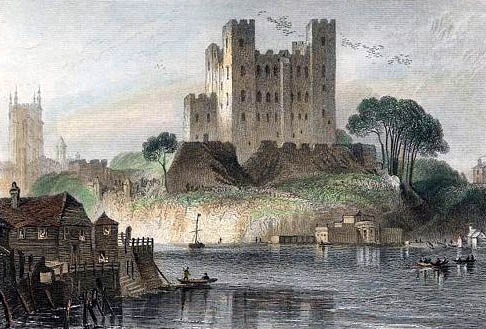
Rochester Castle in 1836

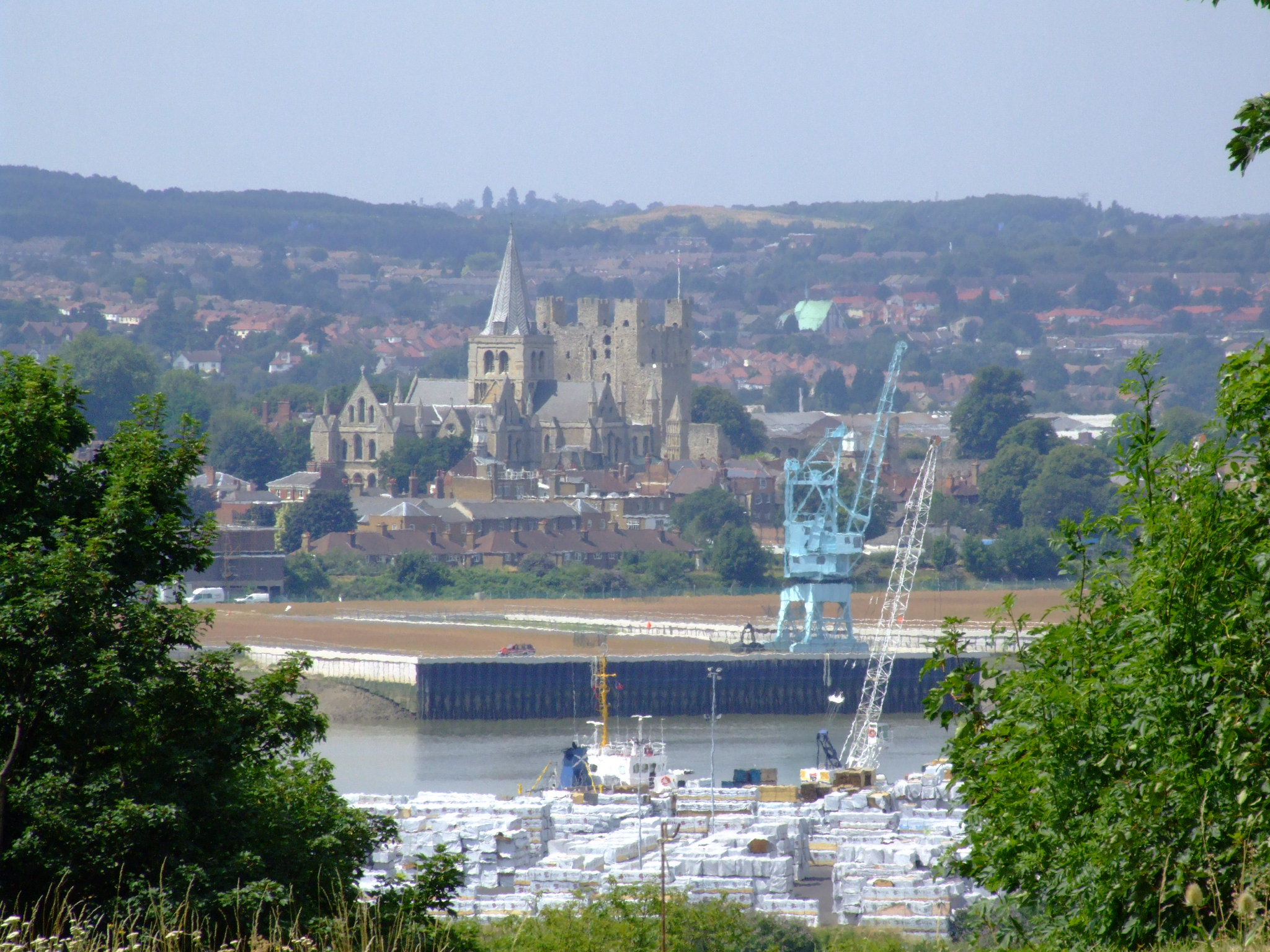
Rochester from across the river

Rochester is a town and former city in Kent, England. It is located at the lowest bridging point of the River Medway about 30 miles (48 km) from London. The town's location is due to the bridge which carries the Roman Watling Street (now the A2) over the river.

== Name ==
The source of the Romano-British name for Rochester, Durobrivae, has been a matter of some debate.

The name Durobrivae can be translated as "stronghold" or "fort" by the "bridge" or "bridges". This could have been the oppidum (see pre-Roman history, below) or a pre-Roman fort. No such fort has been discovered by archaeologists, but much of the land has been disturbed by the succeeding two millennia of continuous occupation. Alternatively, Durobrivae may refer to a small fort set up by Aulus Plautius, the general in charge of the first phase of the Roman conquest of Britain; it was not needed for long, as Kent was soon settled. More fundamentally, there was no bridge in AD 43. The Romans did eventually bridge the river: see the article Rochester Bridge. The Roman pioneers may even have initially built a pontoon bridge to supply the advancing army, replacing it with this permanent structure later.

The alternative explanation notes that Durobrivae was also recorded as Durobrovum and Durobrivis. Either of these could be a Latinisation of the British word Dourbruf meaning "swift stream".

The name is recorded as Durobrivis in around 730 and Dorobrevis in 844. The first of these was pronounced as "Robrivis". Bede copied down the name, c730, mistaking its meaning as "Hrofi's fortified camp" (OE Hrofes cæster). From this comes c730 Hrofæscæstre, 811 Hrofescester, 1086 Rovescester, 1610 Rochester.

From Bede's time the name contained the Latin word castra, which is present in the names of many cities that were once Roman camps (e.g. Chester Latin Deva). It is often assumed that Rochester was a fortified Roman town, but no evidence has been found of a formal fort. The Roman street pattern suggests that it was a line of shops and houses built alongside a road, the characteristic pattern of a vicus. Systematic fortification did take place after AD 175 and this of course was well before Bede's time.

The Latinised adjective Roffensis refers to Rochester.

== Ancient ==
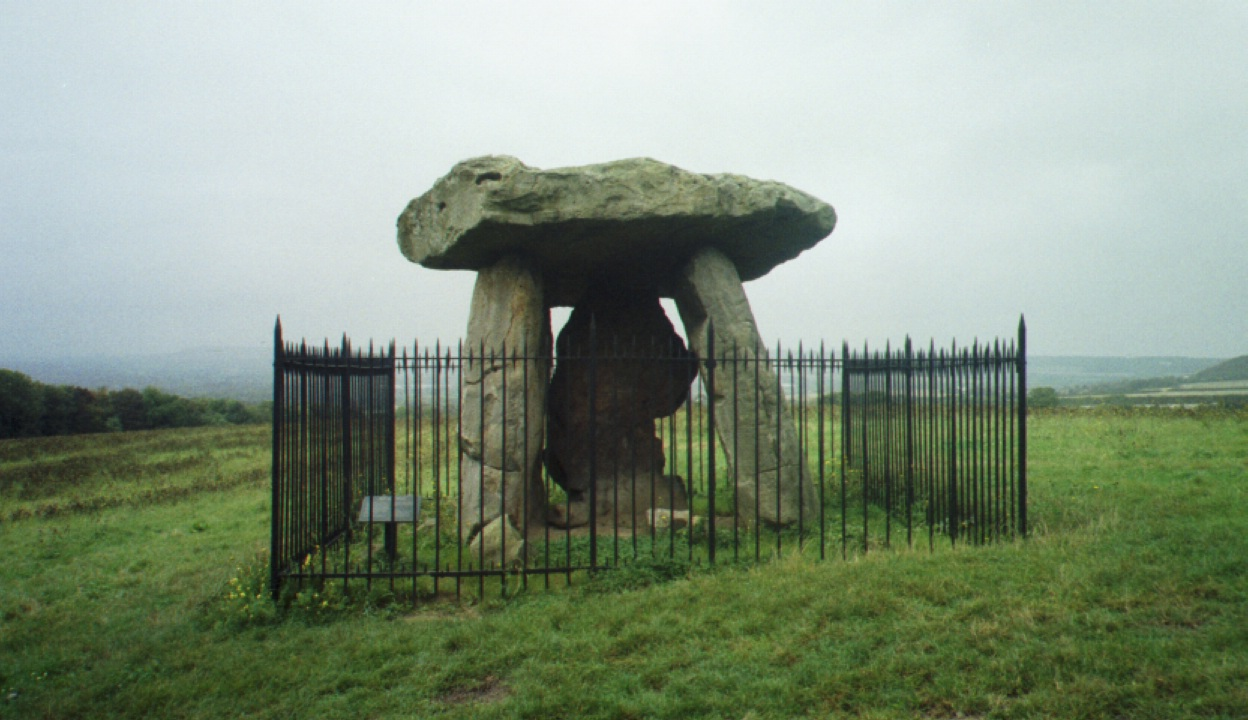
Kit's Coty with the Medway valley in the background

Settlement in the area is first evidenced by the Neolithic Medway megaliths, particularly Kit's Coty House. Within the area of Rochester itself Belgic remains under the Roman levels were found in 1961 by R. E. Chaplin. Coin moulds suggest that this was a centre of some importance.

=== Celtic ===
Rochester was one of the two oppida of the Cantiaci tribe, the western administrative centre of the Celtic kingdom (the other being their capital of Durovernum Cantiacorum, modern day Canterbury). The Celtic trackway which became Watling Street probably passed through on roughly the current alignment: the geography of the Medway dictates the best crossing point.

=== Roman ===
Permanent Roman occupation began with the Claudian invasion in AD 43. The precise route of the Roman advance has been debated; the army could have come along what is now the Pilgrim's Way to Aylesford or along Watling Street to Rochester. The Medway crossing was opposed, resulting in the Battle of the Medway which was notable for taking two days, unusual for that period.

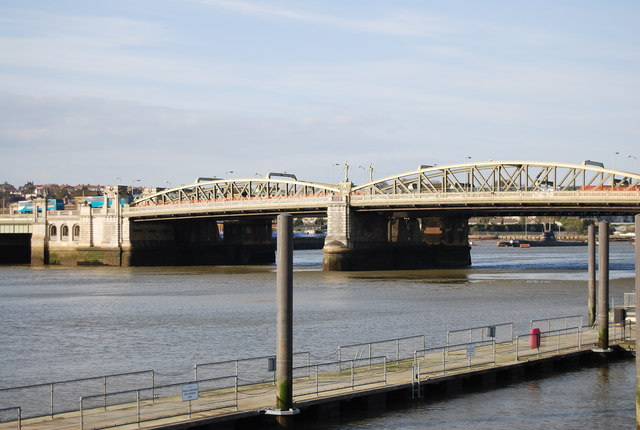
Rochester Bridge, the lowest bridging point of the Medway.

The Kentish oppidum was transformed into the Roman settlement of Durobrivae. Its layout establishes the present High Street and Northgate and Boley Hill. The Romans bridged the river at the same point as the present bridge, for Victorian engineers building the bridge discovered the Roman footings. There were nine piers of composite stone, timber and rubble construction. On top of the piers longitudinal timber beams provided the actual bridging structure, with cross planking to form the road surface. They constructed a substantial causeway, 14 ft (4.3 m) wide, over the marshy ground on the Strood Side of the river, extending from the river to the present day Angel Corner.

In more settled times, the combination of transport links and the fertile Medway valley became the basis of a developed agricultural economy. Compared to the rest of the country there was a marked abundance of Roman villas lining the valley from Rochester down to Maidstone. During the 190s systematic earthen fortifications were established which were replaced in stone during the 220s. Some of these stone defences are still extant.

In AD 407, the last Roman legions left Britain. Following severe Saxon raids in 408 and 409, Honorius sent a letter in 410 to the cities of Britain urging them to look to their own defences. Later in 410, Rome itself fell. Although these dates mark significant changes, a protracted period of sub-Roman culture continued.

== Medieval ==
=== Saxon ===
Following the withdrawal of the legions, the defences of the British kingdoms suffered. Eventually, in AD 449, the Jutish brothers Hengist and Horsa landed at Ebbsfleet or possibly Milton Creek, possibly both. The Britons were defeated at Aylesford, leading to the establishment of a Kingdom of Kent uniting Jutes and Saxons. The town of Rochester became the centre of the Cesterwara Lathe. By the early 7th century Rochester boasted a market and a port reeve.

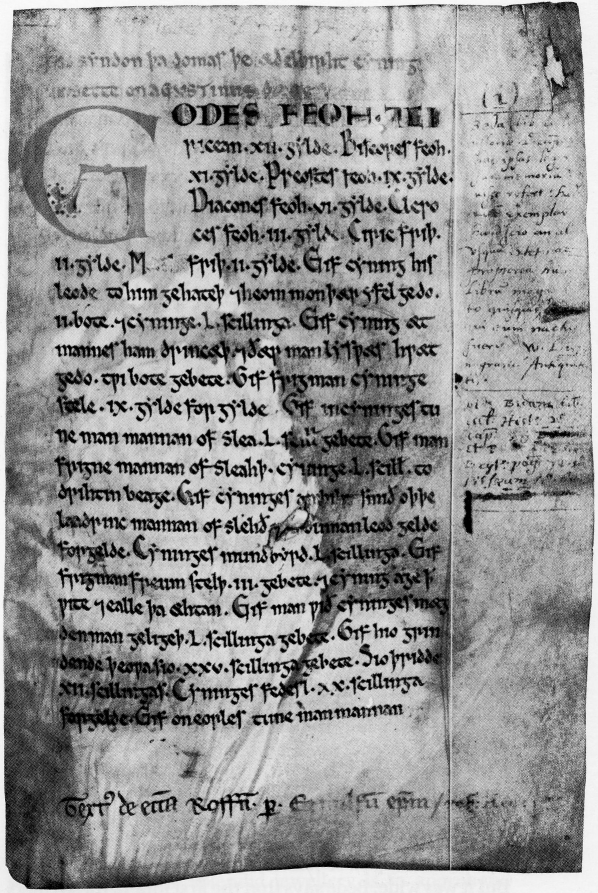
First page of the Textus Roffensis, Rochester Cathedral Library, MS A.3.5

In AD 560, King Ethelbert of Kent came to the throne of Kent. Around AD 600 he promulgated a code of about 90 laws defining crimes and punishments. The code was regarded as sufficiently significant that in the twelfth century (over 500 years later) they were written down in the Textus Roffensis, the "Book of [the church of] Rochester". Although the only surviving copy is the Textus, the laws are referred to by both Bede and Alfred the Great. Æthelberht's laws are thought to be both the earliest law code of any kind in any Germanic language and their wording the earliest surviving document in the English language.

In AD 597, Augustine of Canterbury established the See of Canterbury, and in AD 604 sent Justus to found a cathedral and become the first bishop in Rochester, indicating the interest in the area on the part of the Roman mission organized from Canterbury. The foundations of a small early Kentish church, under the later Norman cathedral, are identified as belonging to Justus's cathedral, dedicated to St. Andrew; the original cathedral was 42 ft (13 m) high and 28 ft (8.5 m) wide. The apse is marked in the present cathedral. Under the Roman system, a bishop was required to have at his see a school for educating suitable persons for the ministry. In addition, to provide music a choir school was established which has become The King's School. The cathedral was served by secular canons, "a body of clergy who lived together but were unbound by any monastic rule". This contrasts sharply with the monasticism of the Celtic church, which was one of the factors to figure in the struggle for control of the Church in England. It is notable that Bishop Felix of Burgundy provided to Sigeberht of East Anglia "master and teachers according to the customs of Kent".

England had become religiously unified following the synod of Whitby in AD 664; politically, though, it was still divided into a number of often warring kingdoms. Following the death of Penda of Mercia a period of turmoil had followed during which Surrey had been annexed by the Mercians. The first recorded act of Æthelred of Mercia in AD 676 was to ravage Kent, destroying Rochester. Three reasons have been suggested for this attack: to prevent King Hlothhere of Kent from regaining control of Surrey, to seek revenge for the murder of the sons of Eormenred of Kent, or at the instigation of the kings of Essex who solicited the invasion in response to recent Kentish attempts to gain dominance over the East Saxons. The damage to the see of Rochester was so great that the incumbent bishop, Putta, retired from his diocese; his appointed successor, Cwichelm, also gave up the see "because of its poverty". The thrymsa coinage had become debased so in the 690s it was replaced by silver coins known as sceattas (probably called "pennies") struck in at least six mints including the one at Rochester. The coins continued in use until the 750s. Bede, in the Ecclesiastical History of the English People (AD 730), records the name of the city as Hrofæscæstre (see the discussion above under Taxonomy). Sigered, a client king to Offa of Mercia, styled himself Rex Cantiae and granted land in Rochester to the bishop. Three years later, in 765, his successor Egbert gave more land and the charter was confirmed by Offa as overlord.

In AD 842 Rochester was sacked by invading Danes and was under siege again from them in AD 884. This time the town held out until relieved by King Alfred. In the 10th century Rochester had the right to mint coins (AD 930). The wooden bridge is mentioned in AD 960, though this may have been a rebuilding in timber using the Roman piers. Slightly later, during Edward the Confessor's reign, various local estates were documented as having a duty to repair Rochester bridge. For instance: "The second pier belongs to Gillingham and to Chatham, and they have to provide planks for one pole and put three beams in position".

=== Norman ===
The events of 1066 initiated a period of change for Rochester. In 1067, William's half brother Odo was created Earl of Kent. During the period 1067–1076 Odo acquired land all over England including much of the land that once belonged to Rochester Cathedral. At the Trial of Penenden Heath in that year the land was recovered. In 1077 Gundulf was consecrated Bishop of Rochester.

One of the first acts Gundulf performed as bishop was to found a hospital for the poor and leprous. Of the original buildings only the chapel survives, the new St. Bartholomew's Hospital is of 19th-century construction.

The cathedral was by now four and a half centuries old and had become derelict. Always under the ecclesiastical and financial shadow of Canterbury, by the end of Siward's episcopate (1058–1075) it was served by four or five canons "living in squalor and poverty". That it had remained secular is not in doubt; one of the canons, Æthelric, became priest of Chatham and made a gift to the cathedral for the soul and burial of Godgifu, his wife.

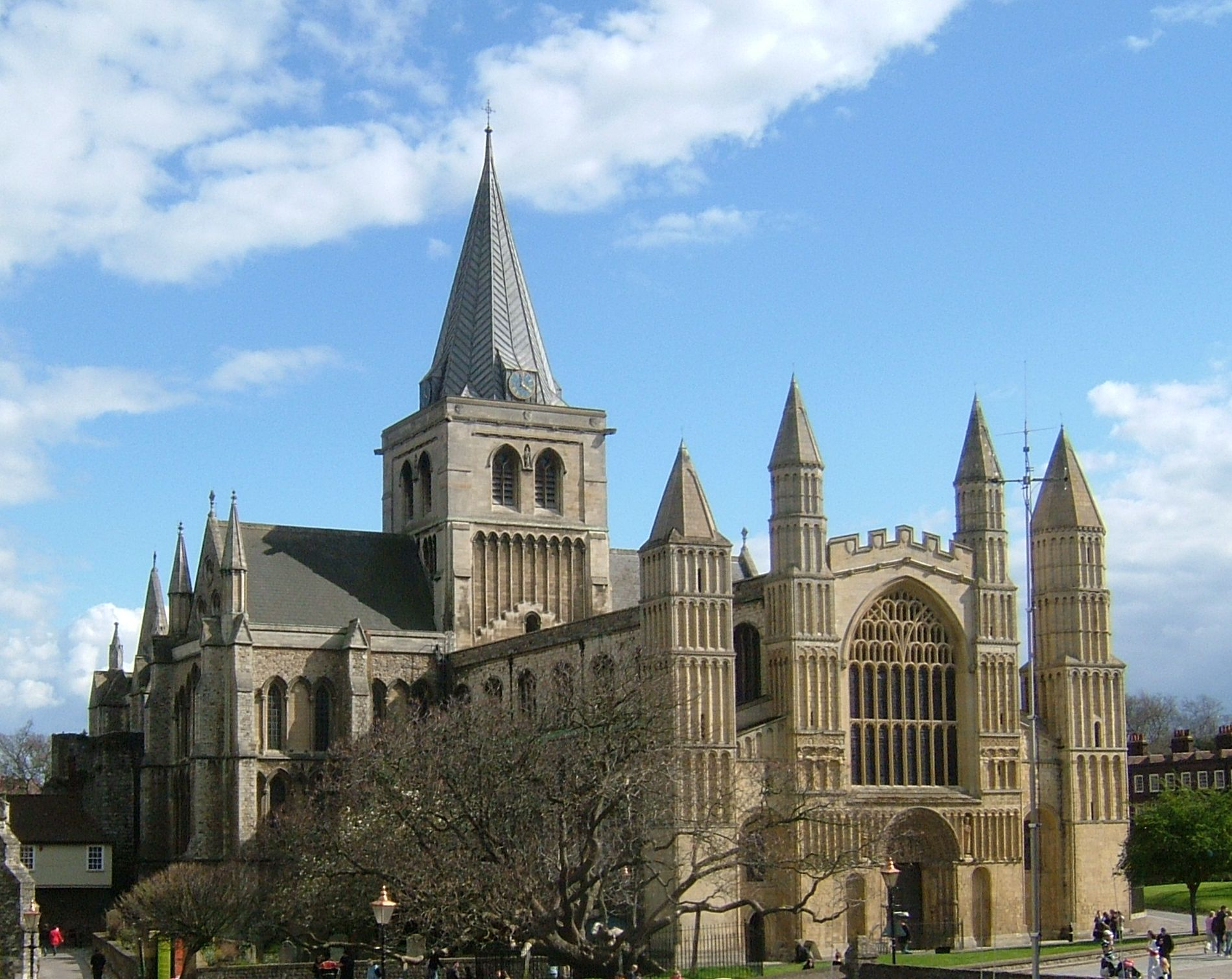

With the income from the restored lands Gundulf started to rebuild the cathedral in 1080 a little to the east of its previous site. The church had a threefold purpose: it became the heart of the new Benedictine priory of St Andrew's, it was the seat (cathedra) of the Bishop of Rochester and it housed the parochial altar of St Nicholas' which served the city. This first phase of the cathedral was complete by 1130. About five years earlier, the Textus Roffensis had been written. It contains the foundation charters of the cathedral and diocese, two copies of pre-Conquest Kent parishes and the Laws of Ethelbert (referred to above). The textus also contains a catalogue of the books in the cathedral library at that time. One hundred and sixteen volumes are named.

Odo had built the first castle at Rochester in 1067. After the trial of Penenden Heath he continued as Earl. However, in 1082 he fell from power, was disgraced and imprisoned. His English estates reverted to the Crown and he was stripped of the Earldom of Kent. William I on his deathbed was persuaded to release Odo and he returned to the earldom. He raised a rebellion against William Rufus in support of William's brother Robert Curthose, Duke of Normandy. The rebellion failed, but Rochester came under siege in May 1088. Conditions within the city were dire: disease was rampant, exacerbated by the heat and flies. Finally the defenders capitulated and Rochester castle was abandoned temporarily. In return for a manor, the king persuaded Lanfranc and Gundulf to rebuild Rochester Castle on its present site. This first stone castle defined the site but did not include the large keep.

In the 19th century a further catalogue of the cathedral library was discovered, by 1202 there were 280 volumes. By this date a distinctive "Rochester Script" had evolved and the names of some of the early scribes are known.

Rochester Castle was granted to the archbishops of Canterbury in perpetuity by King Henry I in 1127. The first archbishop to hold it was William de Corbeil, who was responsible for building the keep. The keep so dominated the skyline that it was even incorporated into the town's seal in the 13th century.

During the reign of King Stephen (1135–1154) there was a period of civil war known as The Anarchy. Rochester escaped direct military action, but the widespread lawlessness and settling of local scores left its mark. Afterwards, one third of the tax on the city was remitted "on the grounds of waste".

=== Later Middle Ages ===
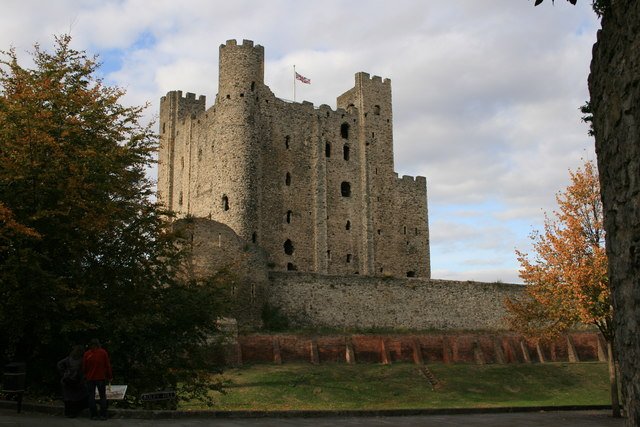
The round tower (centre) was a replacement built by Henry III to repair the damage done to the keep by King John's mine. In contrast to the other two towers visible, it is cylindrical.

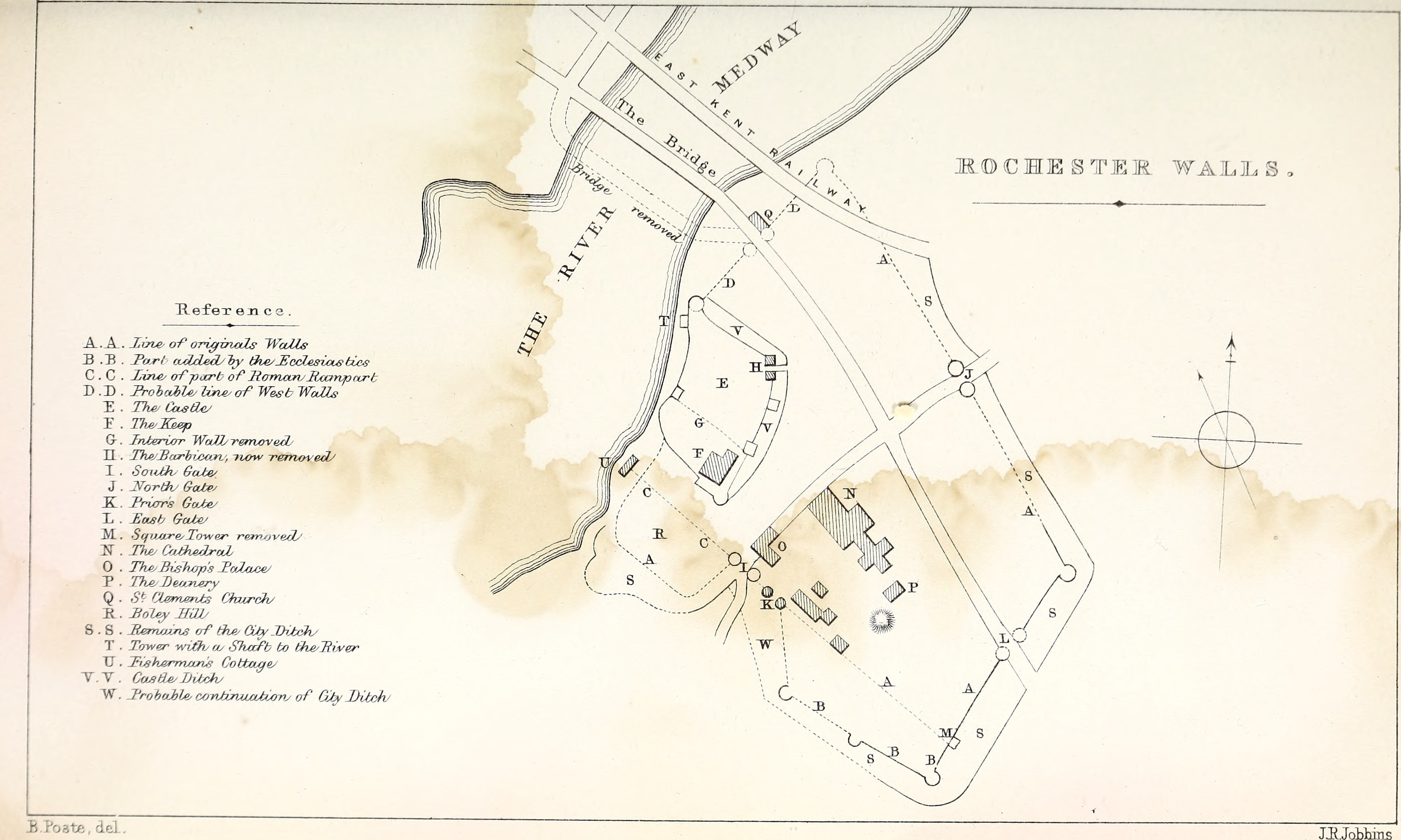
Medieval walls of Rochester

In early 1215 the new Archbishop of Canterbury, Stephen Langton, temporarily ceded control of the castle to King John. The royal constable, Reginald de Cornhill, took control. In June 1215 the barons met King John at Runnymede and agreed the treaty later known as Magna Carta. Shortly afterwards the agreement between Langton and John was dissolved, apparently de Cornhill switched sides and remained constable. Shortly afterwards civil war broke out and rebels marched to Rochester to secure the castle. It appears that the King demanded that Langton hand over the castle, but Langton refused. The rebels feared that he would eventually capitulate and so seized control of the castle to prevent this, apparently with the consent of de Cornhill. Langton fled, the King regarding him as a "notorious traitor".

John rode to Rochester, sending forces ahead of his caravan to secure the city. The royal forces entered with the element of surprise on 11 October, the king arriving two days later. The castle was invested and a siege begun. To prevent relief forces arriving the bridge was pulled down.

The assault began with siege engines unleashing a barrage of missiles against the curtain walls which were breached by mining rather that assault. The defenders retreated into the keep which withstood the siege engines. The south-east corner of the keep was undermined and the pit props soaked in pigs fat. When set alight the resulting fire collapsed the mine and brought down the turret. The defenders retreated behind the great stone diving wall in the center of the keep. On 30 November the defenders finally surrendered.

The cathedral was being developed in this period. In 1227 a new Early English quire was completed to replace the original Norman one. In 1343, under Bishop Hamo de Hythe, the central tower was raised and four bells (called Dunstan, Paulinus, Itamar and Lanfranc) hung there, possibly transferred from the original campanile now known as "Gundulf's Tower", or possibly recast from the original metal.

In 1264 civil war broke out between those loyal to King Henry III and the baronial forces led by Simon de Montfort. Rochester's constable in 1264, Roger de Leybourne, held the castle in support of Henry. A baronial army marched from Tonbridge and to deny them cover or shelter the royalist garrison set fire to the city suburbs. Simon de Montfort led an army from London which crossed the river after some fighting. When they entered Rochester the cathedral was raided. the following day the curtain wall was breached and the defenders retreated to the keep. Just as in 1215 siege engines were set up but could not break the keep. The siege was abandoned on 26 April when the earls received news of a relief force led by Henry III and his son, Prince Edward.

Rochester suffered from the plague, as did the rest of the kingdom, in 1376. In 1381 the castle saw fighting for the final time during the Peasants' Revolt. It was besieged and captured by a group of rebels who plundered the castle and released a prisoner.

Accounts dating from 1339 reveal that the bridge was decaying, this appears to have been a 12th-century replacement for the AD 960 rebuild. In 1339 the bridge was broken down for 24 weeks. Subsequently, on several occasions, a ferry had to be hired, so dangerous had it become. During the thaw of 1381 the pressure of ice finally demolished the old bridge. A new stone bridge was opened in 1392 which lasted until the 19th century. Subsequent to this The Rochester Bridge Trust was established to take over responsibility for the upkeep. The trust was founded by Sir Robert Knolles and Sir John de Cobham and granted its charter from King Richard II. Subsequent benefactors included Ricardo Hwytynton, the real life "Dick Whittington". The money came, and comes, from property rents.

In 1461 King Edward IV granted Rochester a charter in recognition of its loyalty to the crown. The former post of bailiff became that of mayor and the inhabitants were recognised as "citizens", that is the town was recognised as a city. The first mayor was William Mungeam who was allowed £10 for providing a celebratory supper for the freemen.

In 1470 the great window at the cathedral was completed. Rochester Cathedral, although one of England's smaller cathedrals, thus demonstrates all styles of Romanesque and Gothic architecture.

== Modern ==
=== Tudor and Stuart periods ===
In a period of religious conflict, Rochester had a connection with martyrs on both sides of the conflict. From 1504 to 1535 John Fisher was Bishop of Rochester. He was subsequently appointed a cardinal and executed by Henry VIII because he refused to sanction the divorce of Catherine of Aragon. He was canonised in 1935 as a Roman Catholic saint. Shortly afterwards, between 1547 and 1550, Nicholas Ridley was bishop. He was executed by Queen Mary, for demands of faith, becoming a Reformation martyr.

Fisher was not universally popular however. One John Roose was convicted of putting poison in a pot of broth intended for him and for the poor of the parish. This so incensed Henry that a special act was passed in 1530 by Henry to have Roose boiled alive as a form of execution.

On New Year's Day 1540 Henry VIII met Anne of Cleves at Rochester and was "greatly disappointed". Whether connected or not, the old Priory of St Andrew's was dissolved by commission later in the year, one of the last monasteries to be dissolved. The monks and canons became a chapter of secular clergy with the prior as the first dean. With no monastery to run the cathedral school it was refounded by charter from Henry, becoming "The King's School".

The dissolution brought about a dispersal of the cathedral library. At the time many Germans were buying up the manuscripts which were being sold off with all of the monastic property. in 1536 John Leland wrote to Cromwell entreating him to extend Leland's activities so that he could collect manuscripts for King Henry's library. Only in part was he successful. There are now 99 manuscripts from Rochester in the Royal Collection. A further 37 books have been traced. The majority are in collections in England, but some have travelled as far as Berlin, Brussels and Rome. One now resides in San Marino, California.

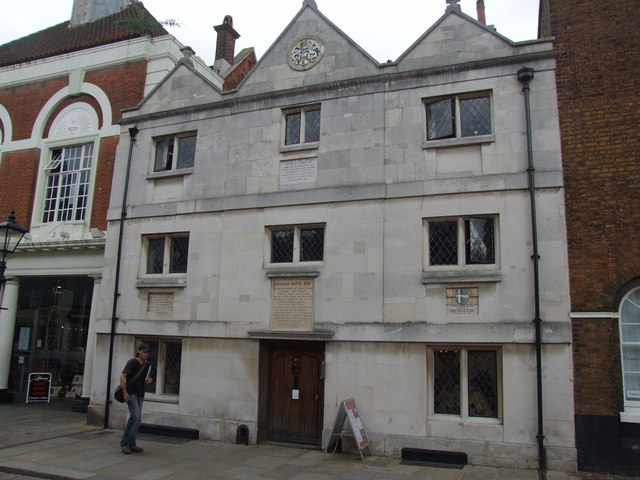
The Poor Travellers' House

In 1579 Richard Watts died, his will was to have long lasting consequences for Rochester. The will established the Richard Watts' Charity which still functions. The most famous part of the will provided for the extension of an existing almshouse by providing overnight accommodation for six poor travellers. The travellers were allowed to stay overnight only (unless they were ill) and were sent on their way with 4d (1.6p), increased in 1934 to 1/- (5p). The house finally closed its doors to the travellers in 1940 when the Emergency Powers (Defence) Act 1939 prohibited casual wayfarers in this Protected Area. The rest of the house continued to be used as an almshouse, in 1615 becoming an orphanage. In 1653 it became a prison which (with interruptions) it remained until 1793 The charity itself has provided more almshouses around the city which house 100 elderly people. The charity has also supported in some measure both the Sir Joseph Williamson's Mathematical School and The Rochester Grammar School (see below).

In 1648 at the start of the Second English Civil War, Rochester was at the centre of a Royalist uprising. At the time this was thought to be the most threatening such uprising and so Lord Thomas Fairfax was sent to suppress it. He wished to avoid a forced crossing of the Medway over the narrow Rochester Bridge and so marched to the south, crossing the river near Maidstone thus provoking the Battle of Maidstone. By the time Fairfax approached Rochester Lord Norwich had marched off towards London, and Rochester itself was spared a battle. The bridge did not get off as lightly as the town however, the retreating Royalists destroyed the drawbridge section of the bridge and threw the planks into the river.

In another contrasting pair of events, Rochester houses saw one king restored and another abdicate. Sir Francis Clarke entertained King Charles II on the eve of his restoration to the throne on 28 May 1660. Following this, his home in Crow Lane became known as Restoration House. It is reputed to be the basis of Satis House in Great Expectations by Charles Dickens. There actually is a Satis House nearby, once the home of Richard Watts. Elizabeth I stayed there as a guest and on being asked if she was comfortable replied "satis" (enough). Pepys visited Restoration House in 1667 and noted: "...a fine walk, and there saw Sir F Clerke's house which is a pretty seat, and into the cherry garden...".

Shortly after the restoration, Samuel Pepys visited Rochester Cathedral on his way between the London and Chatham dockyards. The cathedral had fallen into disrepair during the Commonwealth and Pepys observed it was "now fitting for use, and the organ then a-tuning".

Even though the defences of Chatham had been strengthened by the construction of a fort at Upnor on the Hoo peninsular the Dutch launched a raid on 11 June 1667 as part of the Second Anglo-Dutch War. Under de Ruijter they broke through the chain at Upnor and sailed to Rochester Bridge capturing and firing the English fleet. Trophies from the raid are in the Rijksmuseum, Amsterdam.

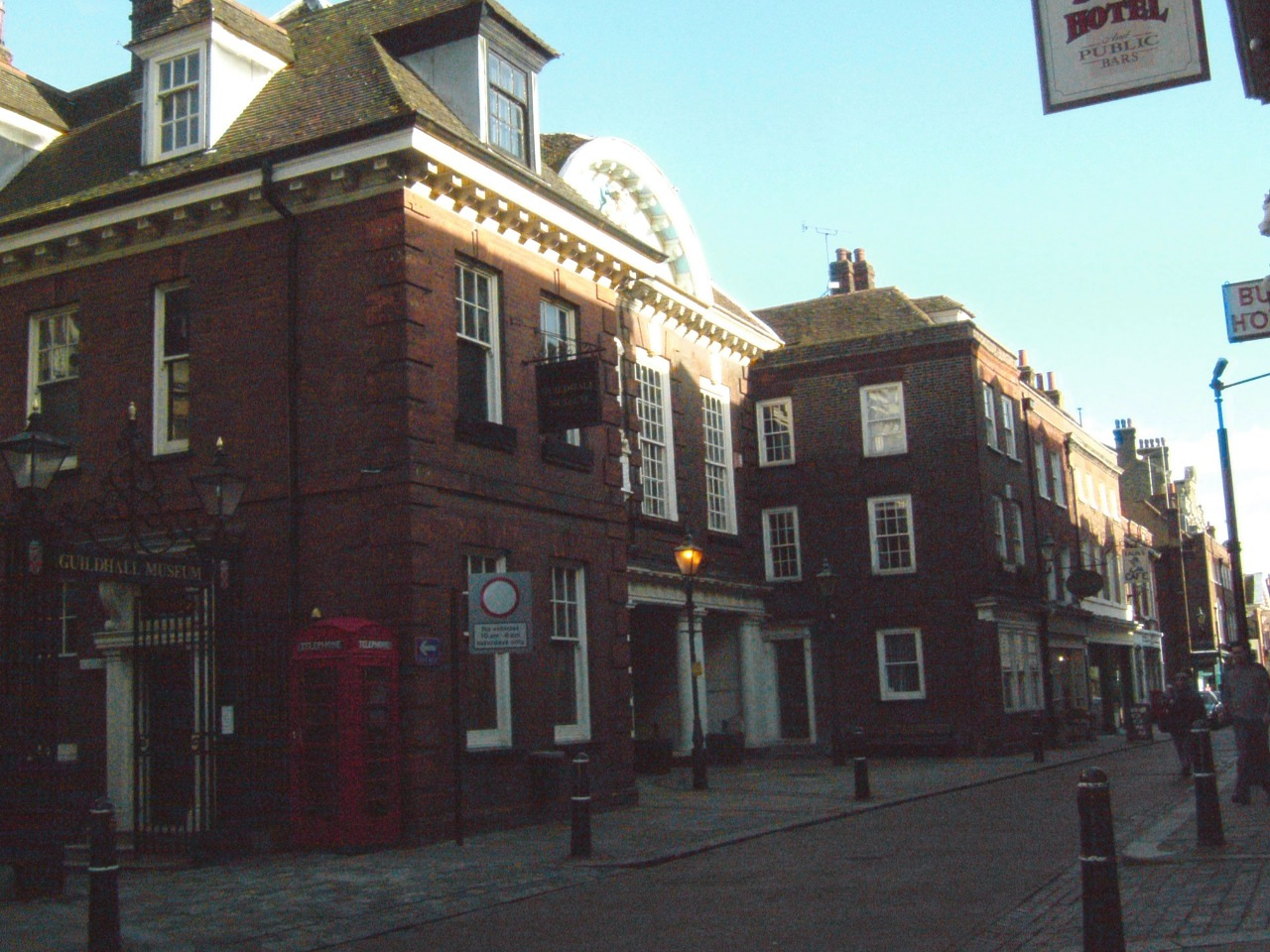
Rochester Guildhall on the High Street.

Somewhat more peacefully 1687 saw the construction of the Guildhall, part financed by Sir Joseph Williamson FRS with the ceiling being given by Sir Cloudesley Shovell. The weathervane is of later work having been first erected in 1780. It is a gilded model of an eighteenth-century fully rigged ship. Subsequent work on it has been limited to repairs following storm damage.

Nearly 30 years after the restoration, King James II and VII spent his last night as king during December 1688 at a house in the High Street which became known as Abdication House. As of 2011, Abdication House is now the Rochester branch of Lloyds Bank.

=== Georgian and Victorian ===
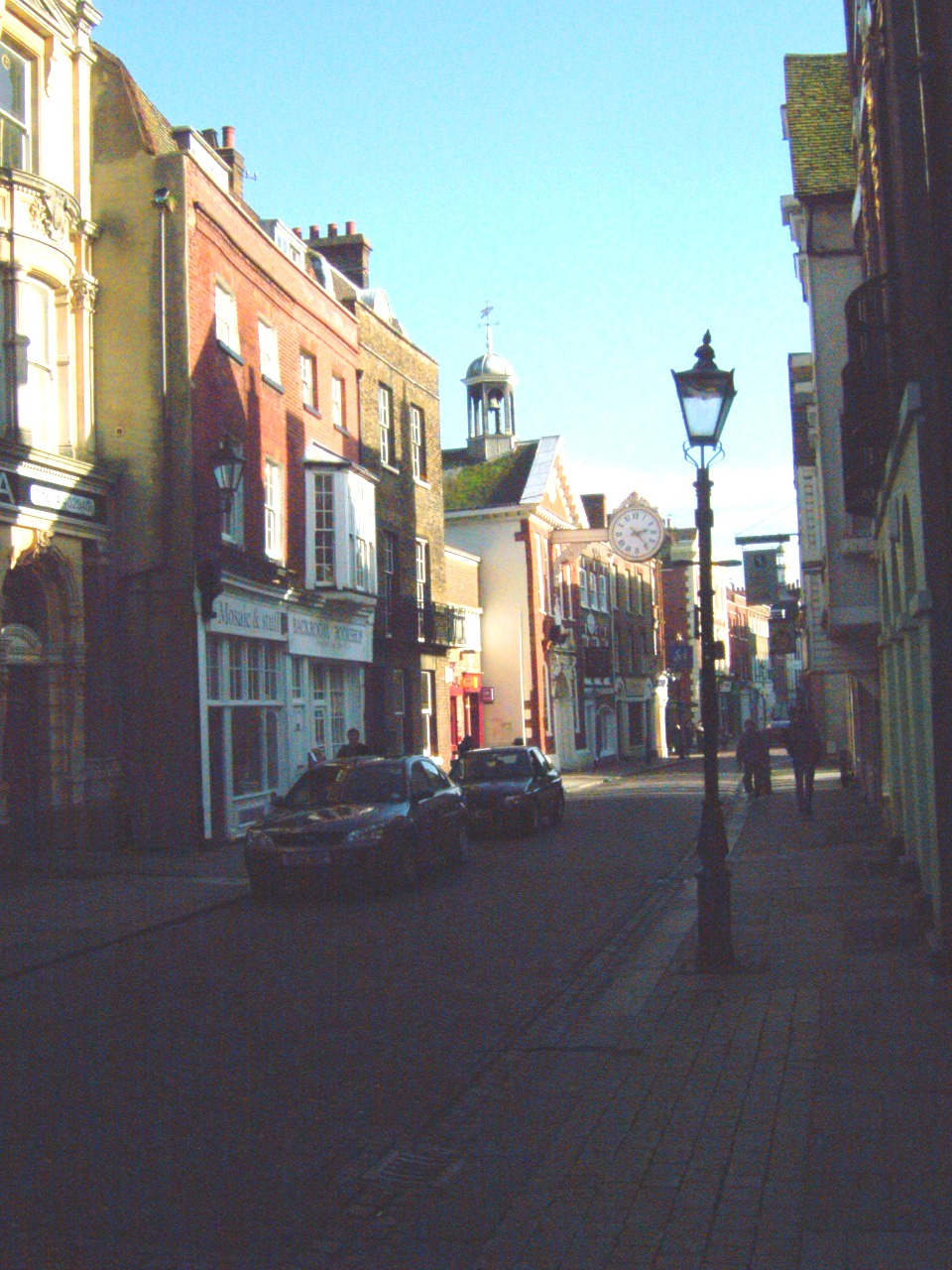
Rochester Corn Exchange on the High Street.

In 1698 the Corn Exchange was started, but as the butchers' market. The present frontage was the gift of Sir Cloudesly Shovell. The existing clock dates from 1771 and replaces an earlier square one.

Shovell also left money in his will (1701) to found the Mathematical School. The school specialised in teaching navigation and mathematics to the sons of freemen of the city of Rochester, the Chatham Naval Dockyard being nearby. It is now the town's grammar school for boys, though girls are admitted to the sixth form.

In 1792 Daniel Asher Alexander was appointed as architect by the Bridge Wardens. He set about widening the bridge from 14 feet (4.3 m) to 26 feet (7.9 m). The drawbridge was an obstacle to this so it and one adjoining arch were combined into a single arch. The work took 30 years to complete and cost £20,000.

During the Napoleonic Wars a ring of forts was built around the Medway area: Fort Clarence, Fort Pitt, Fort Amherst and Fort Gillingham. In the light of the report by The Royal Commission on the Defence of the United Kingdom a further ring of "Palmerston" forts was built during the 1860s: Fort Borstal, Fort Bridgewood, Fort Luton, and the Twydall Redoubts, with 2 additional forts on islands in the Medway, Fort Hoo and Fort Darnet. The forts were to protect the important naval dockyard at Chatham.

The first sailing barges were built around 1815 which superseded the earlier bawley and doble boats. Crewed by one man and a boy they were up to 80 feet (24 m) long and carried between 70 and 120 tons. By mid-century 2,433 barges were registered in Rochester alone. The barges were able to navigate upstream of Rochester bridge by the simple expedient of lowering the mast.

In 1816 the young (four-year-old) Charles Dickens moved to Rochester. Although he only stayed a while, he was drawn back in later years, making his residence from 1856 at nearby Gad's Hill near Strood.

Less than two decades after the Alexander improvements to the bridge it was again considered unsatisfactory. The problem this time was the large number of narrow arches which provoked a rush of water as the tide surged in and out. Tides at Rochester can reach 18 feet (5.5 m) which taken with the size of castle reach and the length of the tidal river above the bridge leads to a significant race. In 1839 Sir William Cubitt proposed a bridge of three piers only. Three of the gaps were bridged by cast iron spans, the fourth by an opening section for shipping. The bridge was opened in 1856. At the same time the parallel railway bridge was constructed, and so the shipping channel was never used. The cast iron arches were replaced by the present steel structure in 1914.

In 1850 Thomas Aveling, financed by his father-in-law, bought a small millwrighting shop in Edwards yard where he set up a business producing and repairing agricultural plant. In 1861 he went into partnership with Richard Porter and moved the business to Strood. Aveling & Porter become the largest manufacturer of agricultural machines and steam rollers in the country. Of the 12,700 steam engines which they made, no fewer than 8,600 of them were steam rollers.

The castle had been in the hands of the Weldon family since the 16th century. In 1870 the corporation leased the grounds to provide a park and then purchased them outright in 1884. In 1965 ownership was vested in the state (today represented by English Heritage) but since 1995 management of the grounds has reverted to the council.

In 1888 the lack of a girls grammar school was remedied: the Rochester Grammar School for Girls (after 2006 Rochester Grammar School) was founded.

On 1 March 1892 Rochester railway station opened, giving rapid access to London.

=== 20th and 21st centuries ===
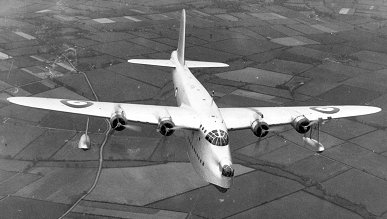
Short Sunderland MkI in flight

During the First World War the Short Brothers' aircraft company manufactured the first plane to launch a torpedo, the Short Admiralty Type 184, at its seaplane factory on the River Medway not far from Rochester Castle. In the inter-war period the company established a world-wide reputation as a constructor of flying boats with aircraft such as the Singapore, Empire 'C'-Class and Sunderland. During the Second World War, Shorts also designed and manufactured the first four-engined bomber, the Stirling.

Following the second world war the bridge was again at its maximum capacity. During railway rivalry a second rail bridge had been built between the old bridge and the existing railway bridge. This had been unused since the 1920s. In 1957 the Rochester Bridge Trust proposed converting it to a road bridge. Construction finally began ten years later, completed in 1970. The new bridge carries two lanes of east-bound traffic, the old bridge now carries two lanes of west-bound traffic.

In the local government reorganisation of 1974 the City of Rochester was merged with the borough of Chatham and part of the Strood Rural District including the Hoo Peninsula. The resulting district was the District of Medway. The district sought and obtained a charter making it a borough, thus preserving the mayoralties of Rochester and Chatham. The area of the former City of Rochester was permitted to continue styling itself city under letters patent. In 1979 the borough council passed a resolution renaming itself as the Borough of Rochester-upon-Medway. In 1982 further letters patent extended city status to the whole borough making it the City of Rochester-upon-Medway.

The decline in naval power and in shipbuilding in general led to the government abandoning the shipyard at Chatham in 1984, and the subsequent demise of much of the marine industry. Rochester and its neighbouring communities were hit hard by this and have experienced a painful adjustment to a post-industrial economy, with much social deprivation and unemployment resulting. On the closure of Chatham Dockyard the area saw an unprecedented surge in unemployment to 15.9%. This had dropped to 3.5% in 2004. The former dockyard has seen a renaissance as the Chatham Historic Dockyard, a museum dedicated to the Age of Sail, though containing much else from the 19th and 20th centuries.

In 1998 the Medway towns formed the basis of a new Medway unitary authority. The City of Rochester merged with Gillingham and Chatham. The outgoing council neglected to appoint ceremonial charter trustees to continue to represent the historic Rochester area, causing Rochester to lose its city status – an error not even noticed by the council for four years, until 2002.

== Bibliography ==
- Adair, John (1998), By the Sword Divided, Sutton Publishing, ISBN 0-7509-1858-6
- Barlow, Frank (1979), The English Church 1000–1066 (2nd ed.), Longman, ISBN 0-582-49049-9
- Bede (1968) [731], A History of the English church and People, translated by Leo Sherley-Price, Revised by R. E. Latham (2nd ed.), Harmondsworth: Penguin Classics, ISBN 0-14-044042-9
- Brooks, Nicholas (2006), "From British to English Christianity: Deconstructing Bede's Interpretation of the Conversion", in Karkov, Catherine E.; Howe, Nicholas (eds.), Conversion and Colonization in Anglo-Saxon England, Arizona Center for Medieval and Renaissance Studies, pp. 1–31, ISBN 9780866983631
- Brown, Reginald Allen (1969), Rochester Castle, London: Her Majesty's Stationery Office
- BBC (2002), Error costs Rochester city status, BBC News 16 May 2002
- BBC (2008), Town seeks to regain city status, BBC News 17 July 2008
- Bonnett, Harold (1975), Discovering Traction Engines, Shire Publications, ISBN 0-85263-318-1
- Cawthorne, Nigel (2013) [first published 2004 (hbk)], The Strange Laws of Old England, Piatkus, ISBN 978-0-7499-5415-4
- Detsicas, A (1983), The Cantiaci, Gloucester
- The Dutch Raid, The City of Rochester Society, 1998
- Glover, Judith (1982), The Place names of Kent, Batsford (1976), republished by Meresborough Books, ISBN 0-905270-61-4
- Harrison, Shirley & Evemy, Sally (4 October 1996), Rochester upon Medway, the Tale of a City, The Word Team, ISBN 0-9517276-1-3
- Howell, Isca (2014), "Continuity and change in the late Iron Age − Roman transition within the environs of Quarry Wood oppidum", Archaeologia Cantiana, CXXXIV
- Kelly's Directory of Rochester, 1951
- Laing, Lloyd & Laing, Jennifer (1979), Anglo-Saxon England, Britain before the Conquest: An Archaeological History of the British Isles, c. 1500 BC – AD 1066, vol. V, Routledge & Kegan Paul, republished by Book Club Associates
- Loyn, H.R. (1979), Anglo-Saxon England and the Norman Conquest, Longman Group, ISBN 0-582-48232-1
- MacKean DD, W.H. (1953), Rochester Cathedral Library, Its fortunes and adventures through nine centuries, Rochester: (privately published)
- Mackie, J.D. (1988), The Earlier Tudors, The Oxford History of England, vol. VII, OUP, ISBN 0-19-821706-4
- Marsh, Ronald (1974), Rochester, The evolution of the City, Medway Borough Council
- The Medieval Bridge, The Rochester Bridge Trust
- Myres, J.N.L. (1986), The English Settlements, The Oxford History of England, vol. Ib, OUP, ISBN 0-19-821719-6
- The New Bridge, The Rochester Bridge Trust
- The Old Bridge, The Rochester Bridge Trust
- Pepys, Samuel (1906), Diary, Everyman's Library, J M Dent & Sons Ltd.
- Plumb, J.H. (17 June 1977), The growth of Political Stability in England, 1675–1725, MacMillan, ISBN 0-333-23061-2
- Poole, Austin Lane (1987), From Domesday to Magna Carta, The Oxford History of England, vol. III, OUP, ISBN 0-19-821707-2
- Restoration house Rochester, an illustrated history and guidebook, Restoration House, Crow Lane, Rochester, May 2001
- Richard Watts' Charity, The Poor Travellers House (leaflet)
- Rochester, The past 2000 years, City of Rochester Society (private pub), 1999
- The Roman Bridge, The Rochester Bridge Trust
- Stenton, Frank M (1971), Anglo-Saxon England, The Oxford History of England, vol. II, OUP, ISBN 0-19-821716-1
- The Victorian Bridge, The Rochester Bridge Trust
- A Walk around the City of Rochester, City of Rochester Society, archived from the original on 7 January 2012
- Whitelock, Dorothy (1974), The Beginnings of English Society, Pelican History of England, vol. 2, Penguin, ISBN 0-14-020245-5
