= St Catherine's Hospital =

St Catherine's Hospital may refer to:

== In the United Kingdom ==
- St Catherine's Health Centre, Birkenhead, formerly named St Catherine's Hospital.
- St. Catherine's Hospital, Rochester
- St Catherine's Hospital, Doncaster
