= Durobrivae =

Durobrivae may refer to:

- Durobrivae, the Roman town of Water Newton in Cambridgeshire, England
- Durobrivae Cantiacorum, the Roman settlement at Rochester, Kent, in England

== See also ==
- Durobrivis
