= The Hundred of Hoo Academy =

Location
- Main Road; Hoo St Werburgh, Kent, ME3 9HH; England; 51°25′18″N 0°33′01″E

Information
- Former name: The Hundred of Hoo School
- Type: Academy
- Established: 1956; 70 years ago
- Local authority: Medway Council
- Trust: Leigh Academies Trust
- Department for Education URN: 137119 Tables
- Ofsted: Reports
- Principal: Carl Guerin-Hassett
- Gender: Mixed
- Age range: 4–18
- Enrolment: 1,481 (2020)
- Capacity: 1,900
- Website: www.hundredofhooacademy.org.uk

Leigh Academy Hundred of Hoo (formerly The Hundred of Hoo School) is a 4–18 mixed, all-through school and sixth form with academy status in Hoo St Werburgh, Kent, England. It is part of the Leigh Academies Trust.

== History ==
In 2007, only 22% of the school's pupils achieved five or more GCSE A* to C grades, including English and Maths. In 2008, it was one of forty schools in Kent and Medway ordered to raise this figure to the government target of 30% within three years, or face closure.

In June 2009, the school was placed into special measures following an inspection by Ofsted. This led to the resignation of its principal Tony Williams, and Gary Holden, head of Rochester Math School, became executive head of both schools. A new governing body was appointed to "handle all governance matters and provide strategic direction for the school".

In the same month, the school was earmarked £1 million to help improve its standards during the next two years, being one of seven schools nationally to be awarded funding by the Department for Children, Schools and Families (DCSF). This followed an earlier announcement that the school had been given National Challenge School status, which at the time allowed councils to "raise standards in schools where replacement with an Academy would not be the best option".

The school became an academy on 1 September 2011, joining The Williamson Trust. It was inspected by Ofsted in 2013, which noted improvements in provision and rated it a good school.

In February 2018, the death was announced of the Trust's CEO, Gary Vyse, at the age of 37. A verdict of suicide was recorded.

== Governance ==
Before 2011, this was a foundation school with Kent County Council and then Medway Council. After being put in special measures in 2009 it joined The Williamson Trust and reopened as an academy on 1 September 2011. The Williamson Trust merged in January 2019 with Leigh Academies Trust as part of the Medway Cluster.

== Description ==
The Hundred of Hoo Academy is an all-through school combining a 4-11 primary school with an 11-19 secondary school. It hosts a specialist autism unit and cooperates with a nursery that shares the same site.

== Primary School ==
The primary school implements the 2014 National Curriculum for Key Stages 1 and 2. It is taught with in the framework of the International Baccalaureate Primary Years Programme.

== Curriculum ==
Virtually all maintained schools and academies follow the National Curriculum, and are inspected by Ofsted on how well they succeed in delivering a 'broad and balanced curriculum'. Schools endeavour to get all students to achieve the English Baccalaureate (EBACC) qualification - this must include core subjects a modern or ancient foreign language, and either History or Geography.

The school operates a three-year, Key Stage 3 offering the 'broad and balanced curriculum'. However in 2017, the academy ran a two-year Key Stage 3 with no discrete IT, followed by a three-year Key Stage 4. This model was deprecated by Ofsted in late 2019. The trust took this on board and in September 2020 and took to offering the 3 year key stage again.

Hoo is a candidate school for the International Baccalaureate Middle Years Programme (MYP). While the content of the National Curriculum is taught, the subjects are grouped into the MYP framework.

- Language and Literature – English
- Mathematics – Maths
- Sciences – Science
- Individuals and Societies – History, Geography and PSHRE
- Language Acquisition – Languages
- Arts – Art, Textiles, Drama, Music
- Design – IT, Food
- Physical and Health Education – PE

Key Stage 4 encompasses year 10 and year 11. All students study the core of English Literature, English Language, Mathematics, Science and PE. and choose four options. Almost all will select history or geography and French or Spanish at GCSE.. BTECs are offered in Enterprise and Marketing, Health and Social Care, Creative iMedia, Performing Arts, Health and Fitness, and Travel and Tourism. There were 14 GCSEs on offer.

Key Stage 5 offered A level courses in 2020 in maths, Sociology, Psychology, English Literature, Film Studies, History, Politics and Geography, Art, Media Studies, Photography, Textiles at 'A' level.

This was supported by vocational courses in Business Studies, Health and Social Care (Single and Double certificate), ICT – Digital iMedia, Public Services, Sport, Applied Science, Criminology, Travel and Tourism.

== Autism Specialist Unit ==
The school has a specialist resource base called the St Werburgh Centre (SWC), which caters for 64 pupils who have autistic spectrum disorder. All of the pupils in SWC are referred by the local authority. They all have a statement of special educational needs, an (EHC plan). The school liaises with Medway Council over capacity.
