= The Williamson Trust =

- Type: Multi-academy Trust

The Williamson Trust is a multi-academy trust centred around the Sir Joseph Williamson's Mathematical School, and the Hundred of Hoo Academy in Rochester, Kent. The trust embraces Sir Joseph Williamson's Mathematical School, The Hundred of Hoo Academy, High Halstow Primary School, Elaine Primary Academy, Allhallows Primary Academy and Stoke Community School. With the Rochester Diocese Board of Education, they co-sponsor of St James’ Church of England Primary Academy School in Grain. The Trust is governed by the board of twelve directors. It delegates many powers to local governing bodies- the local body at Hundred of Hoo has six governors- one of whom is a staff governor and one a parent governor.

On 5 November 2018 it was confirmed that The Williamson Trust would merge with Leigh Academies Trust (LAT), although the wording of the press release suggests that The Williamson Trust is effectively being taken over.

== History ==
The trust was established by governors of the selective Rochester Maths School to oversee the development of the comprehensive The Hundred of Hoo School. It took over responsibility for several of the Hoo Peninsula primary schools. It took responsibility for Elaine Avenue Primary School in Strood.

In January 2018, it disposed of Elaine School, having failed to make any improvement, passing it to the Inspire Trust. The DfE had written to the trust expressing concern about the lack of progress at this school and at Stoke and Allhallows.

In February 2018, the death was announced of the trusts CEO, Gary Vyse, at the early age of 37.A verdict of suicide was recorded.

== Schools in December 2018 ==
- Rochester Maths converted to Academy status in April 2011
- Hundred of Hoo School joined in 2011
- High Halstow- converter academy in April 2012
- Stoke Community School- a sponsored academy on 1 November 2014
- Allhallows Primary Academy- a sponsored academy on 1 September 2013

== Former Schools in December 2018 ==
- Elaine Avenue
