= Richard Watts Charities =

- Formation: 1579
- Founder: Richard Watts
- Type: Charitable incorporated organisation (CIO)
- Registration no.: Registered charity no. 1210119 (CIO); formerly associated charity no. 212828.
- Headquarters: Watts Almshouses, Maidstone Road, Rochester, Kent ME1 1SE.
- Location: Rochester, Medway, England
- Region served: Rochester and surrounding Medway area.
- Services: Almshouse accommodation, housing support, community grants and local charitable services.
- Chief Executive: Martin Sissons.
- Staff: c. 26 (approx.).
- Website: https://www.richardwatts.org.uk/

Richard Watts Charities incorporate Richard Watts Charity set up in the will of Richard Watts in 1579, as well as several other charities in Rochester, Medway. The will originally provided for an almshouse in Rochester High Street: The Poor Travellers House; over time, the money later provided for almshouses in Maidstone Road, along with other accommodation in Rochester, totalling 66 self-contained flats. Other charities absorbed by the Richard Watts Charity include St Catherine's Hospital founded under the Charity of Symond Potyn in 1315.

== Early history ==
The original charity created the post of "provider" to run the charity. The provider was appointed by, and reported annually to, the mayor. His role encompassed supervision of the house, collection of rents and provision of materials to the poor. Provision was also made for housekeeper to "be resyant [resident] there ... clean make the Bedds wash the linen ... and look well to the furniture." Both posts could be held by one or several persons, and that of housekeeper specifically mentions 'he or she or they'. A further agreement between the mayor, bishop, bridge wardens and aldermen in 1615 provided for "..poore children ... who would otherwise lyve in Idleness and be fitt for noe use..." (Note: Hinkley quotes the full text of the agreement in Appendix 4)

To the Honoour of God.
and for the Benefit of the Poor.
of this Parish, This House was.
Built with Mr. Watt's Charity.
A.D. 1671 in which the Sick and.
Aged are taken care of; ye Ignorant.
instructed, Such as are Able to.
Work Imployed, & a Comfortable.
Maintenance Provided for All..

Go and do Thou Likewise.

Inscription above Strood workhouse

On this basis the charity continued uneventfully until 1671. The original will had used the terms 'Parish of St. Nicholas' and 'City of Rochester' fairly interchangeably, however the indenture consistently refers to the city. The problem arose because the city at that time included three parishes: St. Nicholas', Rochester (the area of the medieval walled town, based on the Roman town walls); St Margaret's Without (the area outside the city walls stretching southwards) and St. Nicholas', Strood (the other side of the river). In the early part of 1671 the parish of St. Margaret requested that the outdoor relief should include their people. The charity refused the application so the following year St. Margaret's and Strood jointly applied to the Court of Chancery for a ruling which was decided in their favour. The parish of Strood utilised some of the money to provide a workhouse for the poor, see the inscription alongside.

In 1693, there were allegations of misemployment of the revenues. A new agreement was drawn up whereby the Mayor's role was replaced by the 'Committee for Charitable Uses'. It was to consist of nine members selected annually by the Grand Jury of the Court Leet. It was to meet at least four times a year and to examine the Provider's accounts. The arrangement lasted until 1836.

In 1808 the parish of Chatham followed the lead of St. Margaret's and Strood in filing a bill in Chancery for funding. It was not until 1833 that the matter was settled and Chatham received some help from the charity. The funds for poor relief were now split into 32 parts: St. Nicholas' parish received 20 parts, St. Margaret's 6, Strood 4 and Chatham 2.

Watts' original will had provided that leases on the lands and property he left were to be for a term no more than 21 years. While this was reasonable with sixteenth century artisan buildings and farms, it was not suitable for nineteenth century brick and stone developments. Indeed, on at least one occasion there was no response to an invitation to tender for four houses on land owned by the charity. Eventually the trustees had to apply to the Court of Chancery for permission to extend leases to 99 years, which permission was given.

The 1832 Royal Commission into the Operation of the Poor Laws rethought the whole problem of relief for the poor. As well as establishing a national system of poor relief it also led to charities coming under consideration. The Municipal Corporations Act 1835 replaced the mayor and citizens of Rochester and the oversight of the charity passed to the municipal trustees appointed by the Courts of Chancery.

=== 1853 onwards ===
The Charitable Trusts Act 1853 brought a large number of independent trusts and charities under the supervision of the newly created Charity Commissioners. Watts' Charity was no exception. A new scheme was devised for the running of the charity. The charity was run buy municipal trustees who appointed a clerk and receiver. They also appointed a master and matron to manage the poor travellers house. £4,000 was used to build a new set of almshouses for 20 people in Maidstone Road. £100 was set aside to provide an apprenticeship premium for children who had distinguished themselves at school. £2,000 was spent on the building of the Watts Public Baths with £200 per annum for maintenance. In 1935 they passed into the hands of the Corporation of Rochester though the annual grant towards costs continued for a further 20 years.

£4,000 was granted to the trustees of St. Bartholomew's Hospital, Rochester to enable them to build a "Hospital and Dispensary for the relief of the Sick poor". The charity was also to pay £1,000 (later raised to £1,500) per annum to the hospital and gained the right to nominate as patients up to 20 people at any one time. These donations were maintained until 1948 until the hospital came under the control of the National Health Service.

In 1886 there was a further scheme extending the work of the charity. 11 outpensions of 7/- (35p) per week were established and two exhibitions of £100 made available annually, one each to Sir Joseph Williamson's Mathematical School and Rochester Grammar School for Girls. There were five exhibitions for pupil teachers, each of £6/5/0 annually for three years. The Watts Nursing Service was established with two full-time nurses (one midwife, one district) and six occasional nurses.

The 1934 supplementary scheme increased certain payments and handed the baths over to the council.

=== Post War ===
The 1942 Beveridge Report led to the establishment of the modern British Welfare State. The previous, limited, National Insurance Act 1911 was extended to most workers by the National Insurance Act 1946. The National Health Service Act 1946 introduced universal health care and the National Assistance Act provided a safety net replacing the old Poor Laws. The upshot was that by 1950 much of the charity's former purpose had been taken over by the state.

A review of operations led to the scheme of 1954. Some money was available to help travellers in need of financial assistance and some for "amenities or samaritan funds" at hospitals within the city. Some money was available for apprenticeships, for books, tools, fees and examinations. Power was obtained for discretionary grants to relieve hardship or distress, either directly or via other institutions.

By 1976 sufficient funds were available to extend the almshouses. In 1977 yet another scheme came into operation. Several charities, some of which were already administered by the trustees of Richard Watts Charity were amalgamated under the title: "Richard Watts and the City of Rochester Almshouse Charities":

- Richard Watts General
- Hayward's Almshouses
- The Chatham Intra Charity of Richard Watts
- St. Catherine's Hospital Charities

=== Six Poor Travellers House ===
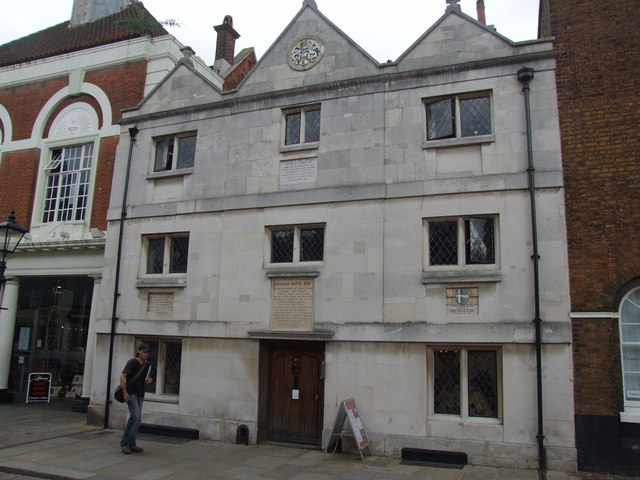
The Poor Travellers' house

The Six Poor Travellers House is a 16th-century charity house in Rochester, Medway, founded by the local MP Richard Watts to provide free lodgings for poor travellers. Watts left money in his will for the benefit of six poor travellers, each of whom, according to a plaque on the outside of the building, would be given lodging and "entertainment" for one night before being sent on his way with fourpence.

The house was the inspiration for Charles Dickens' short story "The Seven Poor Travellers" (with Dickens himself, as narrator, being the seventh traveller). Watts' benevolence and the Dickens story are remembered during Rochester's fancy dress Dickensian Christmas Festival, when a turkey is cooked and ceremonially distributed to "the poor" at the house.

The house features restored small Elizabethan period bedrooms, along with a herb garden in the rear, and is open to the public from March through October.

RICHARD WATTS, Esq.
by his Will, dated 22 Aug. 1579,
founded this Charity
for Six poor Travellers,
who not being ROGUES, or PROCTORS,
May receive gratis for one Night,
Lodging, Entertainment,
and Fourpence each.

Inscription on charity entrance

The small almshouse now known as the Six Poor Travellers existed before Watts left it money in his will. His will refers to "the almshouse already erected and standing", desiring it to be "reedified" [rebuilt] as well as extended with rooms for the travellers. (Note: Hinkley quotes the full text of the will in Appendix 1) The work had been completed before the signing of the Indenture Quadripartite in 1593, probably around the time of the remarriage of Marian in 1586.

Whilst the exclusion of rogues seems obvious, that of proctors has led to local controversy. (Note: The Indenture also excludes women contagiously diseased.) In 1772 Denne claimed that Watts used a proctor to write an early draft of his will, and the proctor perverted Watts' wishes for his own ends. (Note: Denne, quoted in Hinkley.) Later authors claim that the proctors in question were beggars on behalf of lepers. A statute of Edward VI provided for lepers and bedridden people to appoint proctors to beg on their behalf. There had been a leper hospital a short distance away since 1315 (see below). W Gibson Ward describes them as "... mendicants who swarmed ... under the pretence of collecting Alms for the support of Leper houses...". (Note: Quoted by Langton) The English Heritage listing entry includes "...or proctors (ie lawyers)" but does not elaborate further.

In 1615 the charity admitted poor children to the house. There were to be up to ten "men children" who could remain until aged 18 and six "women children" who could remain until 16. There was provision also for the children to be apprenticed to "some honest citizen, or tradesman, or husbandman".

Vouchers from this period show the Mayor requesting "Mr. Provider" to assist those "ver ill" or "poor and impotent". Occasionally the definition of traveller was stretched somewhat as in 1703 when the Mayor requested "relieve these 127 prisoners with fourpence each". It appears that the travellers presented themselves to the Mayor, or a deputy, who would then issue a chit for the Provider.

The trustees kept the house in good repair and in 1845 added a sitting room for the use of the travellers in the evening. In 1855 the supper provided for each traveller "every evening at 7 o'clock" was 1/2 lb (0.23 kg) of meat, 1 lb (0.45 kg) or bread and 1 imperial pint (0.57 L) of coffee. In the morning a further pint of coffee was served and the traveller sent off with fourpence.

After 1880 when Watts Public Baths were available the selection of inmates was performed at the baths, which the travellers were obliged to attend. In 1923 bathrooms were added to the house, however in 1935 the council (who had taken over the public baths) were still allocating facilities for the Inspector of Poor Travellers to make his selection there. (Note: Agreement between Rochester Corporation and the Trustees recorded in the Minute Book of the Baths Committee.) Electric light was installed in 1935 with electric radiators in the bedrooms the following year and in the dining room by 1937.

The Emergency Powers (Defence) Act 1939 prohibited casual wayfarers in Protected Areas such as Rochester. (Note: The Medway Towns include the Chatham Dockyard which was one of the key naval facilities of the Kingdom) Following notice from the Chief Constable the house finally closed its doors to travellers on 20 July 1940 after 354 years of continuous service.

The building was converted in 1948 to provide two flats for two elderly couples, the ground floor being retained as a museum. In 1977 the building was surveyed and repaired. The building was returned to its former state with the ground floor and travellers' rooms as a museum with a residence above.

In 1950 the building was listed as grade I, number 1086479. The 1858 structure is still the original timber-framed building but with the 1771 Portland stone facing. Originally there was one room per floor, but the 1604 rebuild (the "reedified" mentioned above) included the rear stair turret and probably the dividing of the rooms. The remarkable (according to the listing) survival is the extension for the poor traveller's rooms. Modelled on a contemporary coaching inn it has three rooms opening onto the courtyard and three opening onto an unglazed gallery above. Below the handrail the gallery is filled in with lath and plaster, the whole supported on four large chamfered uprights to provide a dry walkway below. The rooms each have a door, window chamfered ceiling beams and a brick fireplace. There is a cellar (not currently open to the public) which contains a "rubble wall that may be early".

The house was the inspiration for Charles Dickens's short story, "The Seven Poor Travellers". Watts's benevolence and the Dickens story are remembered during Rochester's fancy dress Dickensian Christmas Festival, when a turkey is cooked and ceremoniously distributed to 'the poor' (that is, anyone passing by at the time) at the house.

Henry Lucy described a visit to the house in "Christmas Eve at Watts's" in Faces and Places and throws an interesting light on Dickens' story through the words of the house-keeper.

There is also a very detailed account of "Richard Watts's Charity, Rochester" in Chapter VI of A Week's Tramp in Dickens-Land, by William R. Hughes.

=== Watts Almshouses ===
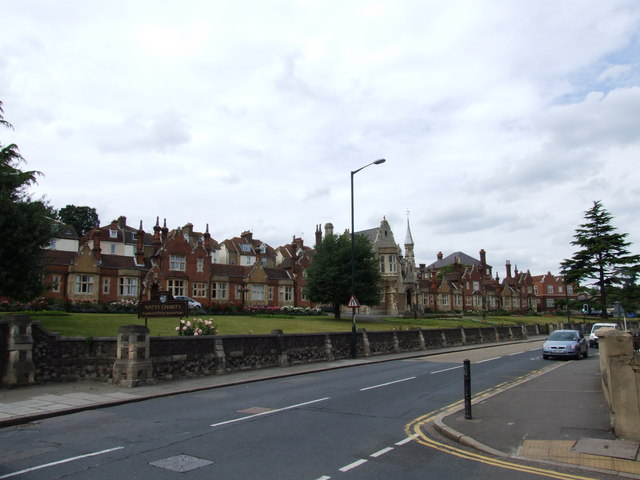
Watts Almshouses, Maidstone Road

In 1857 the trustees purchased a site in Maidstone Road, Rochester for £1,412 10s 0d on which to build new almshouses. The site had been a former Hospital which had been used in turn as a pest house, prison for prisoners of war and lately let for private dwellings. The trustees had been empowered under the 1855 scheme to spend up to £4,000 building the almshouses, but the 1857 plans could not be built for that amount. Tenders were invited and one of £3,449 from Charles Foord accepted, but with alterations the final cost was £4,510. (Note: Minutes of Trustees for 16 January 1861, as reported by Hinkley.)

The building is of red and yellow brick with limestone dressings. The central block in contrast is in rustic rubble ragstone. This central block houses the main entrance, with attached common room and kitchen, and above the Trustees' boardroom. The board room has a robust hammer-beam roof and notable internal brickwork described by English Heritage as "the brickwork and fine pointing of very high quality". To one side were the men's apartments, to the other the women's. The apartments were built along a gallery and each one contained a sitting room, bedroom and scullery.

All the inhabitants were evacuated during World War II to Eylesden, a Georgian house in Sutton Valence. At the almshouses the ARP (Air Raid Precautions) shelters were made available to the public and two gun emplacements installed. (Note: One assumes Anti-Aircraft guns, but Hinkley is not clear on this.) Prior to the inmates' return in 1946 the almshouses were repaired and electricity installed.

In 1970 the almshouses were assigned a grade II listing, English Heritage number 1086457.

In 1976 additional new almshouses were built on the Fort Clarance site which was part of the original 1857 purchase. Ten dwellings, a Warden's house, laundry and guest room were built for a tender of £127,593.

=== Watts' Nursing Service ===
The scheme of 1855 set up a nursing service to provide maternity care and to care for the afflicted poor of the parish. Any of the inmates of the Almshouses were able to call on their services in time of sickness. Care was free. A Head Nurse supervised the service, relying on nurses to provide the actual care. The Head Nurse periodically attended on all those in the care of nurses to check on the standard of work. She also had to visit all inmates of the almshouses once a week, ensure adequate fire precautions and prepare the boardroom for meetings.

Things did not always go smoothly. Thomas Aveling complained in January 1871 about "the reported inefficiency of the Nurses ... more than twelve months since", which is interesting because as mayor 1869–70 he had a level of supervision of the charity. On 2 June 1871 he was appointed to be a trustee at around the same time he left the council.

During the 1930s home-helps were employed by the charity to assist new mothers for up to 21 days after the birth. They were expected to attend from 8 am to 8 pm and to cook, supervise older children (getting them to school and afterwards to bed) and wash the children's clothes. Washing the patient and making the bed were, however, the prerogative of the nurse. Although the scheme seemed to work well, it was too expensive for the charity and the home-helps were discontinued after 1938.

The scheme was not without problems. In 1941 the Royal College of Nursing expressed concern to the trustees for "advertising for a SRN [State Registered Nurse] for district work at a salary of £130 p.a.". Eventually an increase of £50 p.a. was agreed for each nurse. In 1945 the Nurses' Salaries Commission reported and the Ministry of Health established norms for the profession. Thereafter the rates agreed by the Whitley Council were paid.

The coming of the National Health Service (NHS) in 1946 brought a dramatic change to the charity. The county council had the task of organising a free home nursing service for all persons who needed it. Local organisations could participate, they would need to fund 25% of the cost, the county providing the remaining 75%. The charity's nursing service was incorporated on this basis into the NHS with the county funding £2,000 and the charity £1,500. The Charity Commissioners were not happy with a charity becoming permanently involved in the NHS and only permitted the arrangement to run until December 1950. The nursing service continued to provide a reduced independent service until all patients were transferred to the NHS on 31 March 1958. The Nursing Branch of the charity then ceased to exist.

=== Watts Public Baths ===
The 1855 scheme empowered the trustees to erect public baths and wash-houses. There was a site by the river which had been occupied by the baths of the Castle Club. The trustees duly obtained it and built new baths, opening in 1880. Both private baths and swimming baths were provided. The swimming baths were used by schools and between 1882 and 1925 some three and a half thousand children had learnt to swim there. The baths were never run profitably, a yearly grant of £200 from the charity being required. Finally in 1935 the baths were handed over to Rochester Corporation, though the annual grant remained for a further 15 years.

=== Apprenticeships and educational work ===
The 1615 scheme provided for care of poor children. The Poor Relief Act 1601 had made it the duty of Overseers of the Poor to find apprenticeships for pauper orphans and the almshouse followed this lead. Evidence in the records of the 17th and 18th century showed this practice continued, but by the early 19th century all references to children had ceased.

The 1855 scheme set aside £100 per year for providing apprenticeship premiums. Applications were invited each year from prospective apprentices who were interviewed (as were the prospective masters) and a selection made. The apprenticeships were from four to seven years. Between 1856 and 1925, 1,265 apprenticeships were funded. However, the numbers fell from 41 in 1927 to 5 in 1939. Tools, travelling and clothes were also sometimes provided. Economic changes after the war reduced the number of apprentice premiums required and by 1958 no further apprenticeships were given.

At the start of the nineteenth century, virtually all schooling was provided by the Public Schools. As the century wore on, more provision was made for the schooling of all children by the establishment of various state and church primary schools. By 1883 primary education was mandatory and free. Secondary education lagged behind. Pupils were either fee-paying or had to obtain scholarships. It was against this background that the Watts' Charity Education Foundation was established at a committee meeting in October 1894.

£100 was made available annually for ten boys age twelve and over to attend the Sir Joseph Williamson's Mathematical School. Another £100 was provided for eight girls to attend the Rochester Grammar School for Girls. A further £100 was provided in total for eight boys and eight girls who were pupil teachers. Initially the exhibitions were tenable for two years, but the trustees could extend them for a further year. The age for pupil teachers was raised in line with the Education Department's requirements to 15 years in 1899. At the same time, the ages for the other grants was raised to between 13 and 16 years.

The pupil teacher system was closed down by the Education Act 1902 and the money allocated for it was allowed to accumulate to be used for other educational purposes. In 1922, some of the money was used to fund special scholarships at the two schools which had been started by the schools themselves in 1917. In 1930, three-year scholarships were provided for pupils at the Rochester Junior Technical School (three boys) and Fort Pitt Junior Technical School for Girls (three girls). The trustees had discretion in awarding grants. Where all exhibitions were filled, it was possible for the trustees to fund a child as a fee-paying pupil at the charity's expense.

The Education Act 1944 made many previously fee-paying schools into free state schools. Both of the Rochester grammar schools followed this route and as a consequence the exhibitions ceased. The trustees were able under the 1947 act to resume payments of £100 per annum to each school to be used for the encouragement of Music, Drama and the Arts, though the detailed application now lay with the school governors, not the trustees. The charity has made a number of grants to assist pupils at the King's School, Rochester, an independent school founded in 604 to provide choristers for the cathedral, though now with a much wider pupilship. Grants have also been made to enable Mathematics School boys and Grammar School girls to sail with the Sail Training Association (now called the Tall Ships Youth Trust). Grants have also been made to the Scouts.

=== St. Catherine's Hospital ===
In 1315, Symond Potyn founded a leper hospital near Rochester called St. Catherine's Hospital. The original building was at the foot of Star hill. In 1805, the hospital moved to new premises at the top of Star Hill, where it remains. In 1974, a proposal was made to amalgamate it with the Richard Watts Charity. Amalgamation duly occurred on 11 August 1975, thus ending 660 years of independent existence.

The existence of a leper hospital in the area may have been the reason for banning proctors from the Six Poor Travellers house. Proctors begged on behalf of the lepers and were regarded both as a nuisance and a health risk.

== See also ==
- Hayward House, Rochester
