= Wilfrid Butt =

English biochemist and endocrinologist

- Born: 2 May 1922; Southampton, England
- Died: 1 May 2006 (aged 83)
- Education: London University
- Occupation: biochemist
- Known for: endocrinology
- Notable work: Hormone Chemistry
- Awards: Wellcome Prize in Clinical Chemistry, Society for Endocrinology's Silver Plate

Wilfrid Roger Butt (2 May 1922 – 1 May 2006) was an English biochemist and reproductive endocrinologist. He pioneered the isolation and purification of several hormones, particularly follicle-stimulating hormone (FSH), from cadavers, and used his isolates of FSH to treat female infertility.

== Early life and education ==
Wilfrid Butt was born in 1922 in Southampton and later moved with his family to Rochester, Kent. In Rochester, he attended Sir Joseph Williamson's Mathematical School from 1933 to 1939. He was recruited into the Ministry of Supply as a chemist at the Royal Arsenal in his final year of school. While working at the Royal Arsenal during the Second World War, he completed a Bachelor of Science in chemistry at London University in 1944.

== Career ==
After the war, Butt began working at the London Hospital as a research assistant to the endocrinologist Carl Crooke. He moved with Crooke to the Birmingham and Midlands Hospital for Women in 1948, where their research focused on the pituitary-ovarian-uterine axis and female infertility. This was the subject of the PhD he earned in 1954 and a DSc in 1968. Butt became a consultant endocrinologist at Birmingham in 1964, and in 1970 he took over from Crooke as the head of the department of endocrinology. Butt's laboratory was among the first to isolate follicle-stimulating hormone, luteinising hormone and prolactin from the pituitary glands of cadavers, when other research groups were extracting the same hormones from urine. The hormones Butt isolated were considered so pure compared to other isolates that they were used as references in the standardisation of hormones. In the 1960s he also pioneered a programme that treated infertile women who had ovarian failure with his isolates of follicle-stimulating hormone.

Butt served as a Special Professor in Clinical Endocrinology at the University of Nottingham from 1968 and as Honorary Professor of Endocrinology at the University of Birmingham from 1976. He received the Wellcome Prize in Clinical Chemistry in 1978 and the Society for Endocrinology's Silver Plate in 1989. He was the author of six books, including the popular reference text Hormone Chemistry (1967), and over 250 journal articles. From 1965, he was a consultant to the World Health Organization, providing advice to developing countries on opening laboratory services.

== Personal life and death ==
Butt retired in 1987 to Stratford-upon-Avon. He died in 2006.

His son is the organist and conductor John Butt.
