= St. Catherine's Hospital, Rochester =

Former leper hospital in Rochester

Coordinates: 51.3832°N 0.5082°E

St. Catherine's Hospital, Rochester was an English, leper hospital founded in 1315. By the end of the eighteenth century it had become an almshouse charity and moved to its present buildings at the top of Star Hill. In 1975 it merged with the Richard Watts Charity.

== Origin ==
In 1315 Symond Potyn left estates to fund the building of "a House with Appurtenances called the Spittell of St. Katherine of Rochester in the suburbe in Eastgate". (Note: Copy of the "Will of Symond" quoted by Hinkley.) It was intended for any "Man or Woman of the Cittee of Rouchester to be visited with Lepre or other such Diseasses that longe to Impotence". This is the leper hospital of which Richard Watts may have been thinking when he banned proctors from the Six Poor Travellers' house. The will laid down the equivalent of trustees; the Vicar of St. Nicholas, Potyn's heirs, John St. Denys and his heirs and finally the "Baylie of the same Cittee". Rules for the running of the hospital and the behaviour of the inhabitants were included. Amongst other things residents were not to "haunt the tavern or go to ale" which on the surface seems odd as Potyn was the Master of the Crown Inn. Phippen is quoted by Hinkley as remarking on the incongruity of this. Hinkley comments that perhaps as landlord Potyn had seen enough of the effects of such attendance.

The hospital was duly built at the foot of Star Hill. By 1704 complaints about maladministration led to a commission of inquiry which sat at the Bull Inn. Apparently estates were being let for excessive periods at poor rates. An agreement was eventually reached which raised enough money for immediate repairs followed by a rebuild in 1717, some 400 years after the original founding.

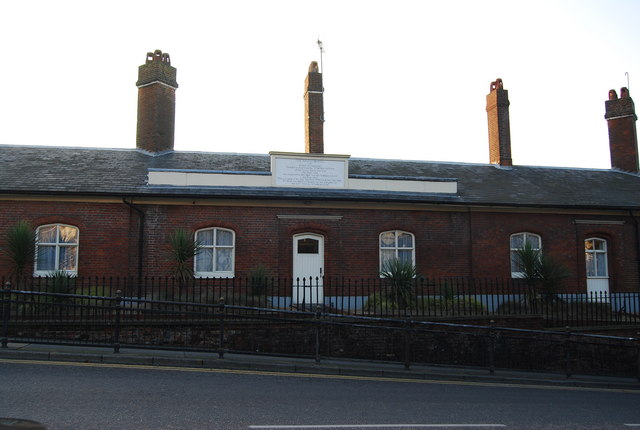
The Ancient Hospital of St Catherine's, Star Hill, Rochester. Originally built in 1316, but removed and rebuilt on this site in 1805.

In 1752 Robert Bayley left money whose dividends were distributed amongst the residents. As with all of the following gifts, a separate charity existed, in this case Bayley's Gift, from the time of the donation until all the St. Catherine's charities were amalgamated with the Richard Watts' Charity in 1977.

In 1778 William Fruin likewise left money to be invested to provide an income to the almsfolk. This was Fruin's Gift.

== New building ==
In 1790 Thomas Tomlyn left £2,200 to provide income to the residents and to pay for the building of the present hospital at the top of Star Hill. The original specification was for 12 poor women of St. Catherine's Hospital. The capital was managed by a charity, Tomlyn's Gift, as mentioned above.

Joseph Wilcocks left £200 to augment Tomlyn's Gift, and a further £100 to wall the new almshouse. His will of 1788 left £2,700 in trust for a county hospital to be built near Rochester. In the event that one was not built, which it wasn't, the income was used to provide running costs and to augment St. Catherine's Hospital. As a result, two additional dwellings were built. The money became the separate charity Wilcock's Gift.

The new building dates from 1805 and is now a grade II listed building, number 1086410, at grid reference TQ 74637 67891. It is a single story building made of red brick set in English bond with a slate roof. The front wall and railings are original.

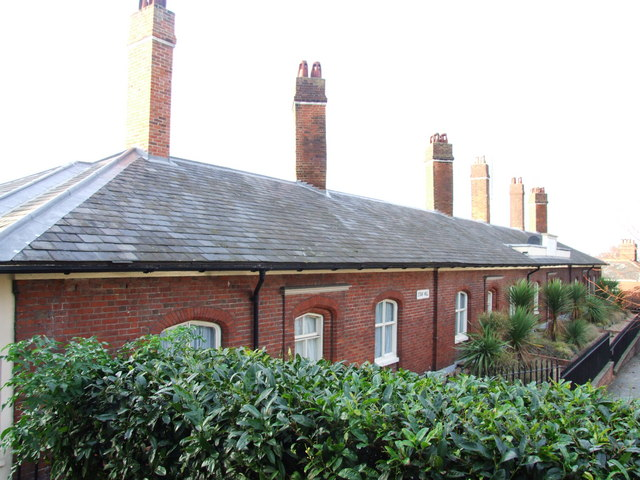
Anonther view of the Ancient Hospital of St. Catherine's.

Susanna Day left a further £500 in her will of 1801. This charity, Day's Gift, provided money for the poor of St. Catherine's Hospital. The final gift in this series of charities was that of Susannah Kettle (hence Kettle's Gift) in a will dated 1815.

By 1850 four new rooms had been built at the Hospital, but by 1881 outgoings were exceeding income. However, by 1884 things must have been corrected, for as well as raising the inmates' pensions, the trustees were able to pay two outpensions annually until 1899. Similar fluctuations in finances occurred during the first half of the 20th century. At the outbreak of the Second World War the inmates were evacuated, but by 1940 were requesting permission to return, something that had to await the provision of air raid shelters.

== Postwar finances and amalgamation ==
In 1953 a valuation of the charity showed an annual loss of £200, and reserves of £600. A rearrangement of the leases regularised the position and by 1955 plans were drawn up for the modernisation of the building. A limit of 15 inmates was agreed, though by 1971 there were 17. In 1974 a proposal was made to amalgamate the charity with the Richard Watts Charity which duly occurred on 11 August 1975, thus ending 660 years of independent existence.
