= National Challenge School =

UK school improvement scheme

A National Challenge School was a school in the United Kingdom that had failed to conform with standards imposed by OFSTED, and rather than being closed and the pupils displaced, was taken over by the Department for Children, Schools and Families (DCSF) who set an improvement agenda.

The scheme was an initiative of schools secretary Ed Balls in June 2008, during Gordon Brown's Labour administration. 631 secondary schools where less than 30% of students achieved five A*-Cs in GCSEs including English and maths were named. Ed Balls said "the government would get all schools past that benchmark by 2011" and announced a £400m-plus budget. Each school was given an adviser, and encouragement to join with stronger schools, to form a trust, or become an academy.

== Legal detail ==
A trust school is a foundation school with a charitable trust. It can be primary or secondary or a special school. It is likely to be grouped with other local schools or with other schools with similar specialities. It is funded like other maintained schools, but has legal powers to establish its own admissions policy, directly employ staff (Note: – would be subject to School Support Staff Negotiating Body (SSSNB) agreements) and take controls of its assets, land and buildings.

The trust must be set up as a charity and is not allowed to make a profit from the school. It may be the charitable arm of a single private company or body but could also have many external partners such as other companies, higher or further education institutions, charities or voluntary groups. Companies involved in gambling, alcohol, tobacco and pornography were ruled out. Trusts could have multi-school and local authority membership. The trust is not obliged, or even expected, to make a financial contribution to the school(s), unlike some academy school sponsors, but have seats on the school governing body.

== Rationale ==
The government saw a benefit in bringing in outside expertise.

The government encouraged universities and the cooperative movement to get involved. Pressure was put on local authorities to facilitate the transfers, by asking questions about local National Challenge Schools when applications for Building Schools for the Future funding applications were made.

== The Process ==
Schools were allocated a local authority or trust advisor, who would work with the Senior Management Team to create a RAP, a strategic plan, which would encourage a clearer focus on setting key priorities, and review progress by the use of clearly defined objectives, milestones and outcomes. Middle managers would be challenged to report fortnightly on how their department was implementing this plan. It involved tight monitoring and data capture on individual pupils.

The RAP is seen as the key driver of change and improves the quality of dialogue between head teachers, senior leaders and middle managers. This is helped by government produced training materials. The process should lead to schools

- prioritising improved attainment rates in 5+ A*-C grades including English and maths;
- identifying a set of priorities based on a clearer assessment of current strengths and weaknesses;
- having greater levels of agreement among senior leadership teams on school priorities;
- increasing the use of tracking data to map in-school variations which willidentify cohorts of pupils that require extra support;
- effective use of interventions.

== Criticism ==
'Naming and Shaming' was rejected by educational professionals. The National Union of Teachers has rejected the government's rationale and the threat of closing these 638 schools - and says that these schools are often performing well in the "toughest areas". The NASUWT rejected the "focus on failure and closure". Chris Keates said, these "are not failing schools. They have simply not yet met, for a variety of reasons, a series of arbitrary numerical targets in certain subjects but with more support will continue on their way to doing so". "It is entirely wrong for these 638 schools to be described in the media as failing. As the government has acknowledged, many of them are on a rising tide of achievement under their existing leadership," said Dr Dunford, a representative of headteachers.

In a briefing paper, deposited in the House of Commons Library, Paul Bolton of the Institute of Education examines the statistics. He shows that the number of schools below the arbitrary watershed has been falling since statistics were collected in 2004, and individual schools have risen above and fallen back, while new schools have fallen in. "Compared to the other secondaries these schools have a more deprived intake and well above average levels of special educational needs. When such factors are taken into account, only a minority of these schools perform significantly below average. Around one-in- five were rated as good or outstanding in their latest Ofsted report. "

== See also ==
- London Challenge
- The Hundred of Hoo Academy
