= Thomas Aveling (engineer) =

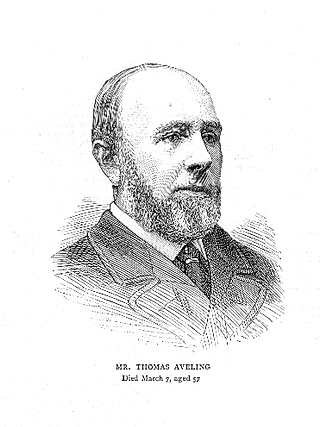
Thomas Aveling

Thomas Aveling (1824–1882) was an English engineer and founder of Aveling & Porter, known as a manufacturer of agricultural equipment and steamrollers.

== Background and early life ==
Thomas Aveling was born 11 September 1824 at Elm, Cambridgeshire, the son of Thomas Aveling (1801–1835), and his wife, Ann Hobson (1802–1873); he was the elder brother of James Hobson Aveling. His paternal grandfather Thomas Aveling of Whittlesey was High Sheriff of Cambridgeshire and Huntingdonshire in 1802; his father was a landowner.

His mother was the daughter of Francis Hobson of Eaton Socon, then in Bedfordshire. Widowed in 1835, she remarried in 1836 at Eaton Socon to the Rev. John D'Urban, curate at High Halstow, in Kent. He had graduated at Queens' College, Cambridge in 1833, as Durban, and was ordained priest in 1834, by John Kaye. His first appointment was as curate at Hedsor in Buckinghamshire. He was moved in 1841, within Kent, to Hoo St Werburgh, near Rochester. He remained there as curate to 1860.

Aveling's stepfather brought him up with "a Bible in one hand and a birch rod in the other".

== Career ==
Aveling was apprenticed to Edward Lake, a farmer, of Hoo. and in 1850 took a farm at Ruckinge on Romney Marsh. In 1851 he was recorded in the census as a farmer and grazier employing 16 men and 6 boys. The business also included a drainage tile works. In 1859, Aveling invented the traction engine when he modified a Clayton & Shuttleworth portable engine, which had to be hauled from job to job by horses, into a self-propelled one. The alteration was made by fitting a long driving chain between the crankshaft and the rear axle. Aveling later invented the steamroller in 1867. Thomas Aveling is regarded as "the father of the traction engine".

Aveling had a reputation as something of a martinet in business, only keeping on the best men. He did provide his staff with recreational facilities with a lecture room and mess room. Lectures were delivered on educational, social and political topics with Aveling himself in the chair and participation from the floor encouraged.

Aveling enjoyed yachting and had his own 28-ton yacht Sally. He was active in the management of several yacht clubs including the Royal Cinque Ports and the Royal Victoria. After contracting a chill on board her in late February 1882 he developed pneumonia and died on 7 March 1882. Aveling is buried at St Werburgh Church, Hoo.

== Interests ==
Following the success of the Aveling & Porter business, Thomas rose to local prominence, first on the council and then between 1869 and 1870 as Mayor of Rochester. Politically he held rather radical views within the Liberal Party. Not surprisingly (given the location of the Invicta Works) he was a strong advocate of improving the river bank at Strood, which was at that time marsh. As mayor he took an interest in the Richard Watts Charity and was appointed to the board of trustees in 1871. He helped lay out the public gardens in Rochester Castle, sat on the Rochester School Board and was a governor of the Sir Joseph Williamson's Mathematical School.

He was a member of the Royal Agricultural Society of England, serving as councilman 1875–1882 and on various committees. He secured the building of a chemical laboratory for the society. He was a member of the Institution of Civil Engineers, the Institution of Mechanical Engineers and the Iron and Steel Institute.

== Family ==
Aveling married in 1850 Edward Lake's niece, Sarah Lake. She was the daughter of Robert Lake, of Milton Chapel, Milton next Canterbury.

== Legacy ==
In Hoo St Werburgh Church there are stained glass windows to Thomas and Sarah Aveling.

There is a secondary school in Rochester, Kent named after Aveling, called The Thomas Aveling School.
