= St Bartholomew's Hospital, Rochester =

St. Bartholomew's Hospital, Rochester
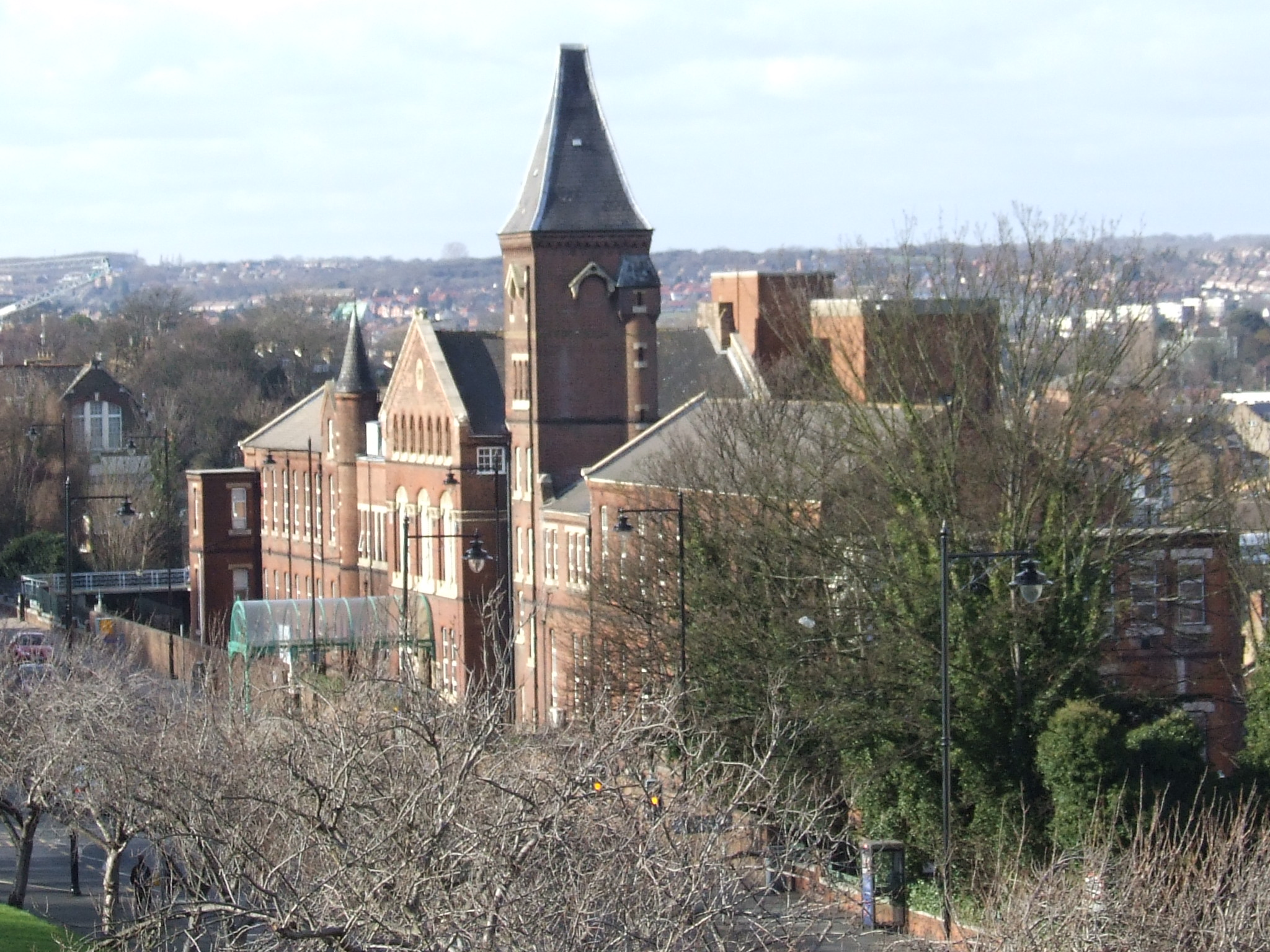
- St. Bartholomew's Hospital taken from Fort Pitt

- Shown in Kent

Geography
- Location: Rochester, Kent, England, United Kingdom
- Coordinates: 51.382633°N 0.515379°E

Organisation
- Care system: Public NHS

Services
- Emergency department: No Accident & Emergency

Helipads
- Helipad: No

History
- Founded: 1078
- Closed: 2016

Links
- Lists: Hospitals in England

St. Bartholomew's Hospital, Rochester was founded in 1078 for the care of the poor and lepers. It survived as a charity until taken over with the founding of the National Health Service. The hospital closed permanently in September 2016.

== History ==
=== Medieval ===
St. Bartholomew's Hospital, Rochester was, until it closed, the oldest existing hospital in England, predating its more famous namesake in London by fifty years. Six hospitals were founded before the Norman Conquest in 1066, but none of them are still functioning. (Note: The six were: St. Cross, Winchester (927); St. Peter, York (936); St. Giles, Beverley; St. Nicholas, Pontefract; St. James, Westminster and St. Leonard, Launceston.) Shortly before St. Bartholomew's was founded, Archbishop Lanfranc (consecrated 1070) erected a hospital at Harbledown outside Canterbury, but it is no longer in existence.

The original hospital was on the main road between Chatham and Rochester which is now known as Rochester High Street. Being for the relief of the poor and leprous, it was built outside the city itself in an area of Chatham which lay within the jurisdiction of Rochester called "Chatham Intra" ("Chatham Within"). The hospital was run by a "Custos" (Warden) or Prior with a number of canons.

Finance was obtained from grants and from the revenues of lands settled upon the hospital, the normal pattern of support for institutions during the Middle Ages. Even with this income the hospital might well have failed but for donations from the Priory of St. Andrew. The priory contributed daily and weekly provisions to the hospital along with the offerings from at altar of St. James and at that of St. Giles, both within the cathedral. On the installation of a new bishop they had the right to collect alms from those present at his table, and even had the cloth covering the table. Henry III gave "forty shillings yearly arising from land within the Hundred of Andeltune". (Note: Charter of 20 May 1246)

Following a representation by the Prior and brethren of the hospital to Edward III in 1342, the king ordered an inquiry into the revenues of the hospital. The inquest before Sir Richard of Cobham revealed holdings worth £9 yielding an income of 21s 6d. (Note: Greenwood quotes the text of the inquest at length) The enumeration notes that there were nine brethren and sisters ("fratres et sorores") and the prior who was himself a leper. Consequently, in 1348 he granted that "poor lepers ... should be quit from all manner of Taxes, Tollages contributions and other quotas and charges for ever". Additional funding was obtained from Henry IV. In 1449 Henry VI confirmed the previous charters.

=== Early modern ===
As a result of the Dissolution of the Monasteries (which, for Rochester, occurred in 1540), Henry VIII granted the patronage to the Dean and chapter of Rochester. The hospital therefore continued as an independent charity, but without the grants and offerings from the cathedral. The only income was from the estates settled on it. William Lambarde writing in about 1570 described the hospital as "a poor show of a decayed hospital". Most of the monastic hospitals were given to the Crown; Greenwood suggests that it was only the poverty of the hospital that preserved its independence.

The development of a Royal Dockyard at Chatham brought people and prosperity to the area. The meagre estates which had formerly only supported a decayed hospital became more valuable. The value increased to the point that two attempts were made to seize the land for the benefit of the Crown, one under Elizabeth I and the other under James VI and I. Ultimately the matter was settled in 1627 with the lands vested in the hospital under the ultimate control of the Dean of Rochester as Governor and Patron.

Income from the estates was of two sorts: fines and rents. The former refers not to judicial punishment but to one-off payments made on the taking up or renewing of a lease. The latter was a periodic payment made by a tenant, just as in modern usage. In 1716, the Chapter of Rochester Cathedral tried to obtain a voice in the management of the estates, in particular claiming that all fines and rents should be passed directly to the Brethren of St. Bartholomew's Hospital. An appeal to the Bishop of Rochester led to a settlement whereby the number of Brethren was increased, but the Dean still managed the leases and received the income.

In 1836, the newly formed Charity Commissioners heard about the retention of the fines and sent Mr. Daniel Finch to investigate. Just considering the period of office of the then incumbent, Dean Stephens, from 1822 until 1835 Finch found that £5,707 in renewal fines had been misappropriated. The findings were reported to the Attorney-General and in 1847 the case of R. v Dr. Stephens started. Stephens' defence was that the practice had been going on from "time out of mind". Eventually the claims against the defendant were dismissed, but thenceforth all of the hospital's income had to be used for hospital purposes.

=== The new hospital ===
This new income stream, along with a grant of £4,000 from Richard Watts Charity in 1855, allowed the hospital to consider new buildings. Following a reorganisation in 1858 a new large hospital opened in 1863 on New Road just a few yards up the hill from the original site, but on land included in the original eleventh century foundation. Richard Watts' charity continued to grant £1,000 per annum to the hospital, reserving the right to nominate as patients "any number of persons, not exceeding Twenty at one time".

Initially, not all of the hospital was fully opened. Although built in 1863 the west wing only opened for patients in 1894, once sufficient funds for its operation had become available. Local benefactors (including notably Mr. G. Winch and Mr. T.H. Foord) funded the opening of a children's ward, an operating theatre and a hydraulic lift. The following year, Mr. Foord paid for the building of a new nurses' home at a cost of over £6,000. In the same year, the accounts noted a gift of a horse ambulance. The accounts note "on receipt of a message by telephone it will be dispatched promptly to the scene of any accident, it being understood that the person summoning it is responsible for the horse-hire".

During first half of the twentieth century, the hospital continued to grow. In 1919, a pathological laboratory was opened. A grant of £10,000 from Mr. Edward Lloyd of Sittingbourne in 1926 paid for a ward which was named the Helen Lloyd Ward after his wife. A Mr. Matthew Tower of Sheerness on the Isle of Sheppey left a legacy, also in 1926, and the female medical ward was named Sheppey Tower after him. An Association of Friends of St. Bartholomew's Hospital started in 1928. Income raised through the Friends paid for a more modern pathological laboratory, two new operating theatres and various other rooms. Eventually they paid for two new wards and for the rebuilding of the nurses' home.

In 1948, the hospital came under the aegis of the National Health Service and charitable grants were discontinued. Much of the general hospital work was transferred to Medway Maritime Hospital nearby. St. Bartholomew's remained open after over nine centuries under the management of Medway Community Healthcare which provided in-patient rehabilitation wards as well as various clinics.

The hospital was closed in September 2016. The site was sold for £2.65 million to MCR Property Group in November 2018 for a £30 million mixed-tenure residential development.

== St Bartholomew's Chapel ==
grid reference TQ 75249 67892

St Bartholomew's Chapel is at the heart of the original hospital. Since the nineteenth century rebuild of the hospital it is now a short walk down the hill. The chapel is a grade II* listed building, number 1268238. The building is of flints and rubble with limestone dressings and a tiled roof.

The chapel was first built in Gundulf's time, being completed between 1115 and 1124 during the episcopate of Ernulf with Hugh de Trottescliffe (a monk) being the chief architect after Gundulf. The chapel is the only remaining part of the original St Bartholomew's Hospital. The earliest part of the chapel is the east end with a rounded, domed sanctuary. The three round-headed windows are original 11th century and carry typical zig-zag decoration. Very few Norman apses remain unaltered and Greenwood suggests that this may be the earliest remaining example in the country. Adjoining the chancel to the south is a vestry containing a piscina attributed to de Trottescliffe decorated in exactly the same manner as capitals attributed to Ernulf in Rochester Cathedral. The chapel was altered in the 13th century and this is the basis of the extant nave. The entry in the English Heritage listing suggests a cloister lay to the south (up hill), but little remains visible.

The chapel was supported by the Priory of St. Andrew until the Dissolution of the Monasteries, after which it transferred to the Dean. By 1560, the chapel was ruinous and a lease was granted to George Hope (a smith) on the chapel, its grounds and a tenement adjacent to the hospital's gateway. Hope was to repair the chapel "being old and ruinous and like to come to utter decay" and convert it into "an honest and seemly dwelling house". In 1699 it contained two upper and two lower rooms. Twenty-five years later Dean Prat bought out the various leases and converted the building back to a chapel, providing with an altar and other furnishings. The following year William Walter of Chatham bought the leases of two houses to the west of the chapel, one to use as an extension and one to be let to provide income. In 1787, three galleries were added. Between 1830 and 1846, Dean Stephens paid for further repairs and salaries. The vicar of St. Margaret's Rochester was paid to perform Sunday services, for many years previously they had ceased.

Sir George Gilbert Scott was given the task of restoring the church in 1896, and said of the building that it was "a precious archaeological and historical relic, the preservation of which was of the utmost importance". New stained glass was provided by Heaton, Butler and Bayne, Sir George Gilbert Scott, Charles Kempe, and Bell & Beckham. In 1962 the chapel was described as being "in a perfect state of preservation and beautifully decorated, and is equipped with modern lighting and heating arrangements". Since then the chapel has become redundant and has again fallen into a state of disrepair. Long virtually just a shell, it was on the market for ten years before being sold to Paul Fernback of Centaur Properties. The grounds have been cleared and tidied with extensive renovation work inside. The new occupants were the Celestial Church of Christ. As of 2017 the building has been taken over by Granite Gym.

In 1978 an archaeological excavation was carried out near the entrance. As well as one of the original walls, a variety of pottery sherds dating from Roman to modern times was found.

== See also ==
- Healthcare in Kent
- List of hospitals in England
