= Sir Joseph Williamson's Mathematical School =

Location
- Maidstone Road; Rochester, Kent, ME1 3EL; England; 51.3703°N 0.4987°E

Information
- Type: Grammar School; Academy
- Motto: Latin: Sub Umbra Alarum Tuarum ("Beneath the shadow of thy wings")
- Established: 1701; 325 years ago
- Founder: Sir Joseph Williamson
- Department for Education URN: 136662 Tables
- Ofsted: Reports
- Head teacher: Eliot Hodges
- Age: 11 to 18
- Enrolment: 1250
- Houses: Bridge, Castle, Gordon, Pitt, River, Thetford, Tower
- Colours: Yellow, Light Blue, Navy and Black
- Alumni: Old Williamsonians
- Website: sjwms.org.uk

The school after it was rebuilt in 1895.

The oldest known photograph of the Mathematical School. Free School Lane is in the distance. Taken c 1880.

Sir Joseph Williamson's Mathematical School (SJWMS) is an all boys' grammar school with academy status in Rochester, Kent, and a co-ed sixth form, also referred to as Rochester Math or The Math School. The school was founded by the statesman Sir Joseph Williamson (1633–1701), lord of the nearby Manor of Cobham, Kent, who, in his will, bequeathed £5,000 to set up the school. The school was termed a mathematical school because it specialised in teaching navigation and mathematics to the sons of Freemen of the City of Rochester, the Chatham Naval Dockyard being nearby.

== History ==
The first building was in 1708 when a "school house" was built in part of the filled-up moat outside the city walls. In 1840 additional rooms were constructed and in both 1882 and 1893, additions were made. In the late 1960s, the buildings were demolished, and the site is now a car park next to a nightclub. The school's playing fields and swimming pool were originally by the River Medway off Rochester Esplanade; they are now off Maidstone Road, Rochester, next to the area known as Priestfields (not to be confused with Gillingham FC's stadium, Priestfield). An annexe (now known as P block) was built at the Maidstone Road site in the 1950s, housing only the second and third years. By the early 1960s, the entire first and second years, and 3A and 3B were located there and 3G and 3L moved to the temporary buildings in the upper yard at the High Street site. In autumn 1968, the whole school moved to a new building on the site. Initially, this featured a main block, hall, sports hall, gymnasium, 25-metre indoor swimming pool and science block. The school's music block was expanded in 2005 to include a new teaching room and several new practice rooms.

In the 1990s, a sixth-form centre was constructed, and at the turn of the century, a maths block was created upon the old staff car park. The sixth-form centre houses a series of classrooms for the use of pupils throughout the school. There are still two sets of temporary classrooms. The school also has sports facilities, including an artificial turf pitch for hockey, two cricket pitches, tennis courts, football and rugby pitches, as well as the swimming pool, gym, and sports hall.

A new mathematics centre was opened in 2002, in line with the Math's new status as a specialist school for maths and computing. In 2006 the school scrapped its A-level computing course, despite having received specialist funding to teach the subject. After a six-year gap, A-level computing was reinstated as an 11-pupil pilot subject in 2011. After positive results were achieved by the pilot group, the option to take computing at A-level and GCSE was reintroduced in 2013.

The school was granted an "outstanding" status in its Ofsted report in 2006 and then again in 2008 and was given specialist status for humanities, focused on history and geography.

The school was one of the first 100 schools in the country to have been designated a National Teaching School. The school became an academy in April 2011.

Founder's Day is held on the first Saturday of July: pupils attend Rochester Cathedral for a morning service and return to the school in the afternoon for sports and other activities. The following Monday is a school holiday.

An art and design technology block – called the Da Vinci Block after a competition to decide its name – opened in 2012. Food Technology became a part of the curriculum but has since been removed, this was then later (2022) added back. The English department has since been rehoused in the old art and technology classrooms opposite the hall.

In January 2019, The Williamson Trust was merged with Leigh Academies Trust.

== House system ==
Originally there were five houses; Bridge, Castle, Gordon, Pitt and Tower. Bridge House was named after Rochester Bridge (to which all boys who crossed Rochester Bridge on the way to school would belong and whose colours were to be black and white). Castle House was named after Rochester Castle (whose members were Rochester boys and whose colours were to be black and red). Gordon House was named after Major General Charles Gordon (to which the boys from Old Brompton and Gillingham would belong and whose colours were to be blue and white). Pitt House was named after William Pitt, the 1st Earl of Chatham (for boys from Chatham and Luton and whose colours were to be red and white). Lastly, Tower House was named after the Tower of Jezreels (for boys from Gillingham High Street and Chatham Hill and whose colours were to be green and white). Boys were told to group themselves so as to get some idea of the numbers in each house and to appoint officers.

At the start of the Second World War, the School had disbanded the House System. In Autumn 1945, new interest had been added that year to all forms of athletic sports by the revival of the House System. There were now four Houses instead of five Houses; Bridge, Castle, Gordon and Pitt. Tower House no longer existed. The Old Tower House included almost entirely boys from Gillingham and Rainham, and very few boys from those districts attended the school. The Houses no longer contained boys from definite areas; the arrangement for drafting boys to the various Houses ensured that any group of four new boys one should be allotted to each House, although the rule was modified in the case of brothers and of sons of former members of the School Houses. As there were likely to be few such sons, and as four Houses were easier to deal with than five, it was thought not desirable to revive Tower House.

When the House System was created, the original Houses had different colours from today. Bridge changed from black and white to green. Castle changed from black and red to red. Gordon changed from blue and white to dark blue. And finally, Pitt changed from red and white to Yellow. When this change happened is not confirmed.

More recently, River House was created in 1993 (named after the River Medway, and whose colours were to be purple) and Thetford House in 1996 (named after the sister school in Norfolk, and whose colours were to be light blue). Tower House was reintroduced in 2019.

== Founder's Day ==
Founder's Day takes place on the first Saturday of July, with a service in Rochester Cathedral, followed by sporting events at the school. This is done to honour the founder and other school benefactors.

== Notable former pupils ==
- Harry Arnold (1941–2014), war correspondent and royal reporter
- Wilfrid Butt, biochemist and endocrinologist
- Bill Esterson, Labour MP for Sefton Central
- Guy Fletcher English songwriter
- David Garrick (1717–79), actor, playwright and theatre manager. Briefly a pupil, apparently under the headmaster's private tutelage
- Tommy Knight, actor, Luke Smith in The Sarah Jane Adventures, Waterloo Road (TV series)
- Nitin Sawhney, musician, composer and disc jockey
- James H. Wilkinson, professor of computer science at the University of Stanford from 1977-86. The J. H. Wilkinson Prize for Numerical Software is named in his honour
- Albie Morgan, footballer
- Naushabah Khan, Labour MP for Gillingham and Rainham

== Headmasters ==
- John Colson 1709 - 1740
- Pierce Dixon 1740 - 1766
- Joseph Hawkins 1766 - 1816
- Benjamin Hawkins 1816 - 1831
- Rev John Graham 1831 - 1861
- Rev Thomas Cobb 1861 - 1876
- Charles Bathurst 1876 - 1880
- Charles Bird 1880 - 1910
- Harry James Cape 1910 - 1916
- A W. Lucy 1916 - 1926
- Edwin Dowsett Clark 1927 - 1943
- Kenneth R. Imeson 1944 - 1954
- Leslie Thomas Waddams 1954 - 1971
- Alan Hall 1971 - 1989
- Keith Williams 1989 - 2008
- Gary Holden 2008
- Eliot Hodges

== Bibliography ==
- Flower, D E L, ed. (1951), A short history of Sir Joseph Williamson's Mathematical School Rochester 1701 – 1951, Rochester: The Governors and the Headmaster Note: privately printed.
- Sir Joseph Williamson's Mathematical School (2016), Prospectus Information 2016 (PDF)
- Smith, Frederick Francis (1976) [First published 1928], A History of Rochester, Rochester: John Hallewell Publications
- The Williamson Trust (2016), Sir Joseph Williamson's Mathematical School
