= Taber (surname) =

Taber is a surname. Notable people with the name include:

- Brian Taber (1940–2023), Australian cricketer
- Catherine Taber (born 1979), American actress
- Erroll James Livingston Taber (1877–1947), Justice of the Supreme Court of Nevada
- George M. Taber (born 1942), American journalist
- Gladys Taber (1899–1980), American writer
- Henry Taber (1860–1936), American mathematician
- Isaac Walton Taber (1857–1933), American illustrator
- Isaiah West Taber (1830–1912), American photographer
- Jane Taber (born 1957), Canadian journalist
- John Taber (1880–1965), American politician
- Margaret Taber (1935–2015), American engineer and writer
- Norman Taber (1891–1952), American middle-distance runner
- Phoebe Taber (1834–1916), American painter
- R. N. Taber (born 1945), English poet and novelist
- Robert Taber (actor) (1865–1904), American actor
- Robert Taber (author) (1919–1995), American author and journalist
- Stephen Taber (1821–1886), American politician
- Thomas Taber II (1785–1862), American politician
