= One & Other =

Performance art created by Antony Gormley

Coordinates: 51.50819°N 0.12873°W

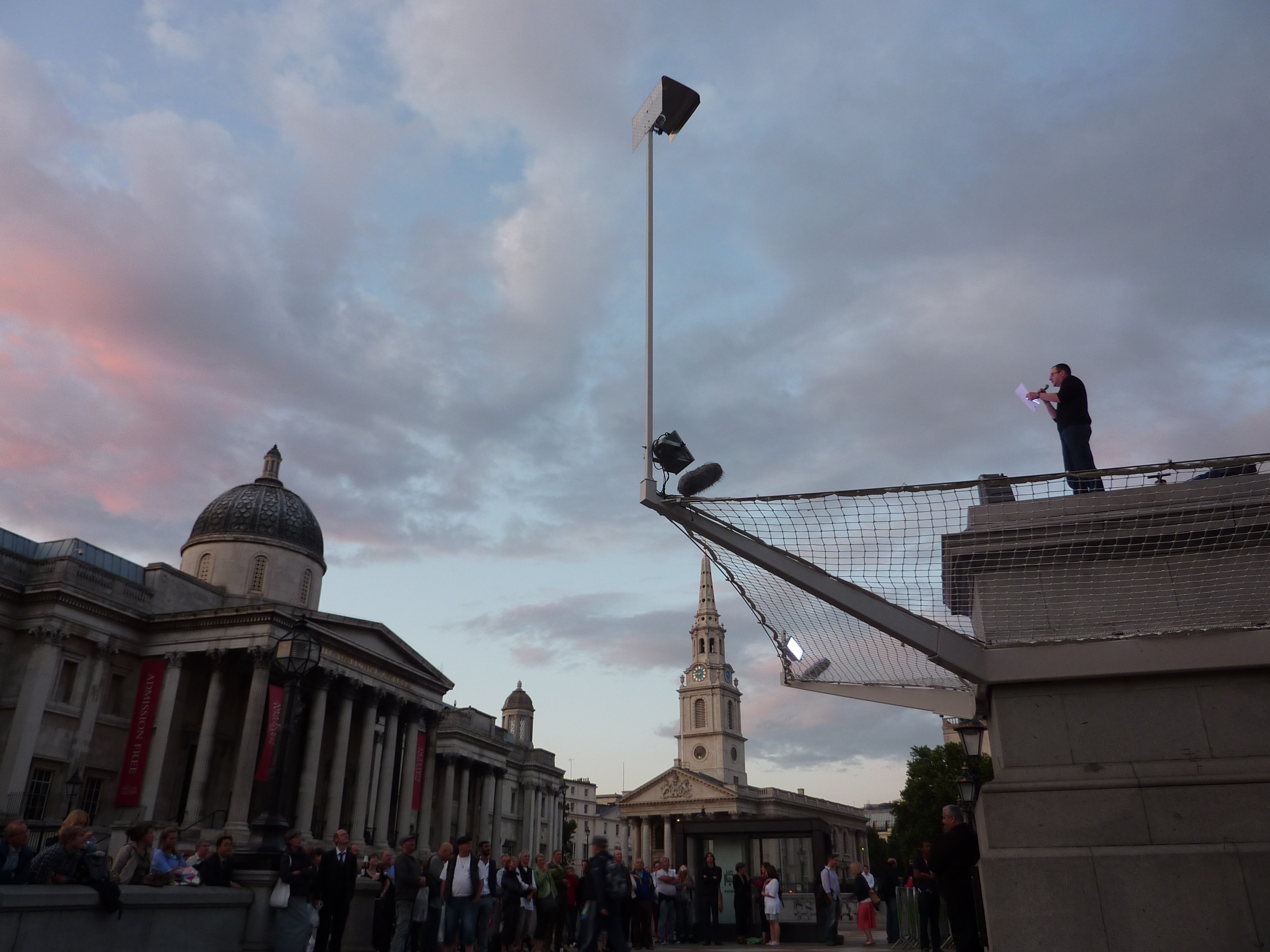
Antony Gormley at the opening of One & Other.

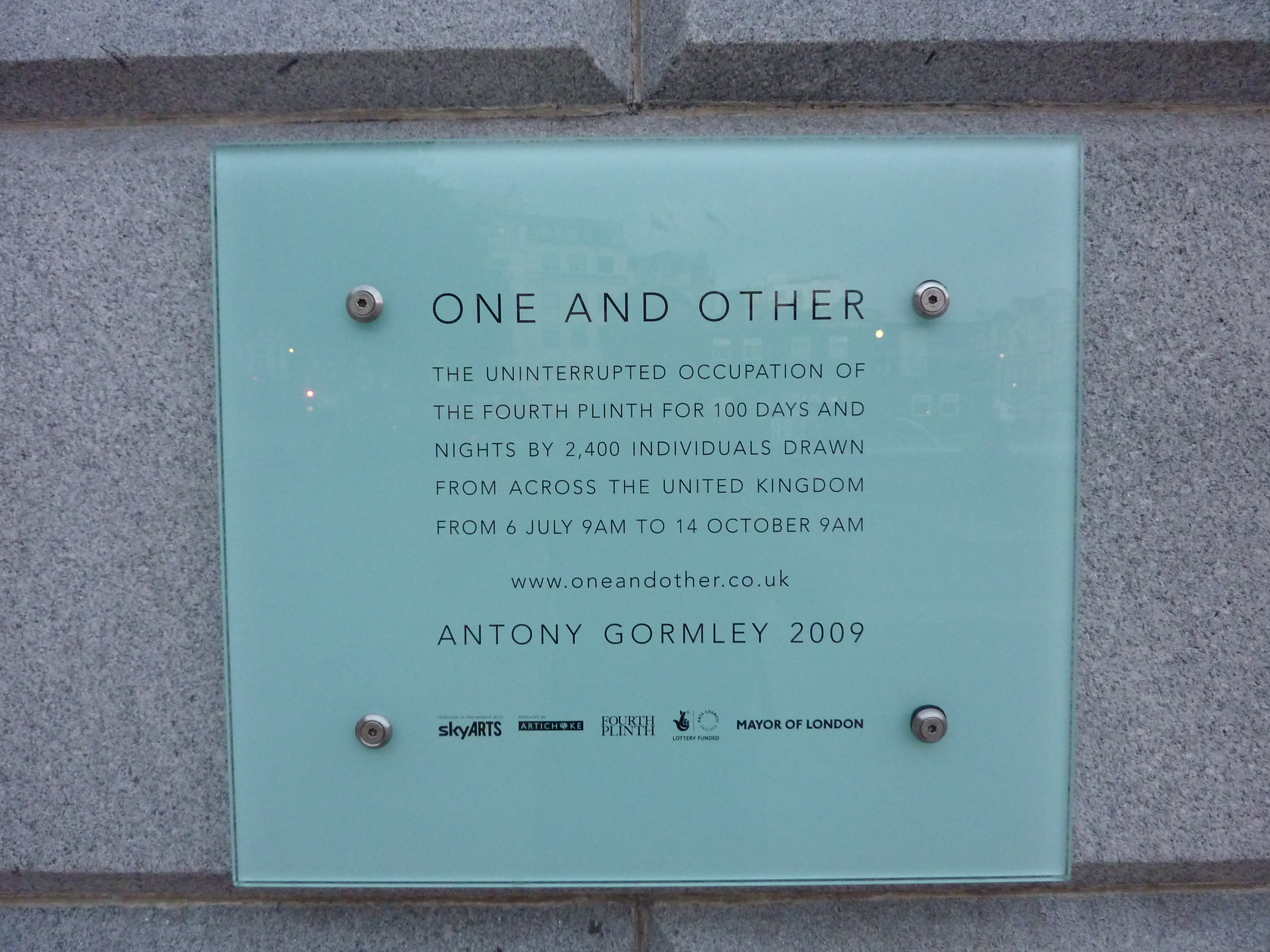
The temporary plaque attached to the plinth.

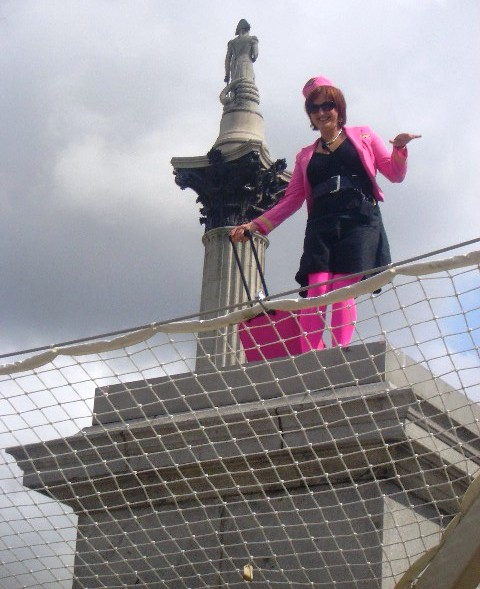
16.00 to 17.00 on 17 July 2009: Karen Ogilvie flying paper kites and distributing hundreds of sweets all with written advice such as "Be friendly to a stranger today"

One & Other was a public art project by Antony Gormley, in which 2,400 members of the public occupied the usually vacant fourth plinth in Trafalgar Square, London, for an hour each for 100 days. The project began at 9 am on Monday 6 July 2009, and ran until 14 October. The first person to officially occupy the plinth was Rachel Wardell from Lincolnshire. A documentary art book by Gormley, entitled One and Other, was published in the UK by Jonathan Cape on 14 October 2010. The Wellcome Trust has posted online at its website its series of oral-history interviews of the 2,400 plinthers.

== Opening ==
The project was opened by the Mayor of London, Boris Johnson. Minutes before the official launch Stuart Holmes, an anti-smoking protester, managed to clamber onto the plinth and displayed a banner calling for a ban on tobacco. Gormley urged him to do the "gentlemanly thing" and give up his place to the first official "plinther", Rachel Wardell. He did so and descended in the cherry picker used to carry participants to and from the plinth.

== Participants ==
Members of the public could apply for an hour on the plinth via the project's website. Gormley himself applied but didn't get a place. Reviewing the event afterwards, The Guardian's top ten "plinthers" were:

Name	Performance
Gerald Chong	Demolished a cardboard replica of the London skyline, dressed as Godzilla.
Amanda Hall	Constructed a full-size Gormley-style human figure from bread products.
Ollie Campbell	Pitched a tent, from which a live chicken and two blow-up dolls emerged.
Steve Cousins ("The Balloonatic")	Performed in a red catsuit with a large, red balloon.
Sam Martin	Dressed as a football referee, Martin challenged members of the public and announced half-time.
Jonathan May-Bowles ("Jonnie Marbles")	Invited members of the public to text their secrets to him, which were then read aloud.
Neil Studd	Dressed as a living statue of Lord Nelson, in an echo of Nelson's Column.
Liz Crow	Sat in a wheelchair wearing a Nazi military uniform, as a political statement on the rights of disabled people.
Susanna Meese-Simpson	Posed naked as if for a life study.
Paul Speller	Performed a succession of scientific experiments submitted by the public, including an experiment with a tin can telephone.

Asked for his favourite, in 2015, Gormley stated that choosing was unfair but, when pushed, selected an agoraphobic woman, who sat in the middle of the plinth, curled up into a ball. He also said he had liked a woman from the first day of the event, who was accompanied by a Cuban mariachi band that performed beneath the plinth, and people who used the opportunity to commemorate war dead.

On 14 July at 8.00 pm, poet R. N. Taber read a selection of his poems, while photographer Alex Boyd collaborated with Scottish Makar (Poet Laureate) Edwin Morgan for his time on the plinth. On 12 August at 1 am, a naked plinther was asked to cover up by the police.

Streamed live online by SkyArts, the exhibit quickly developed a cadre of regular Twitter followers who provided a running commentary of events on the plinth. The videos, later looked after by the British Library's web archive function, are currently not available and there are no plans for them to become available.
