= Gillingham, Kent =

Town in Kent, England

Coordinates: 51.385°N 0.550°E

Gillingham
- Town
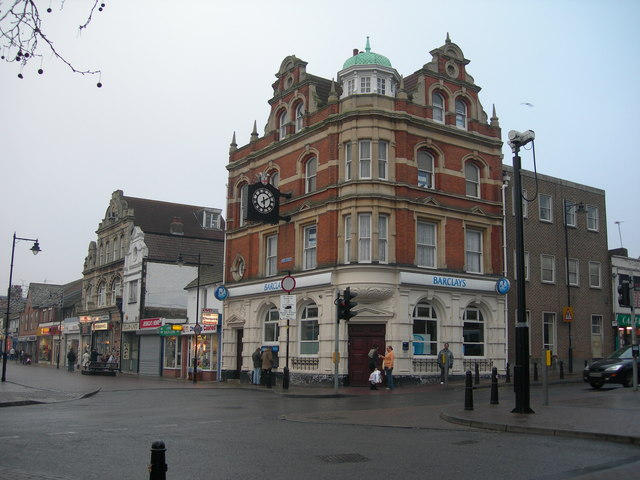
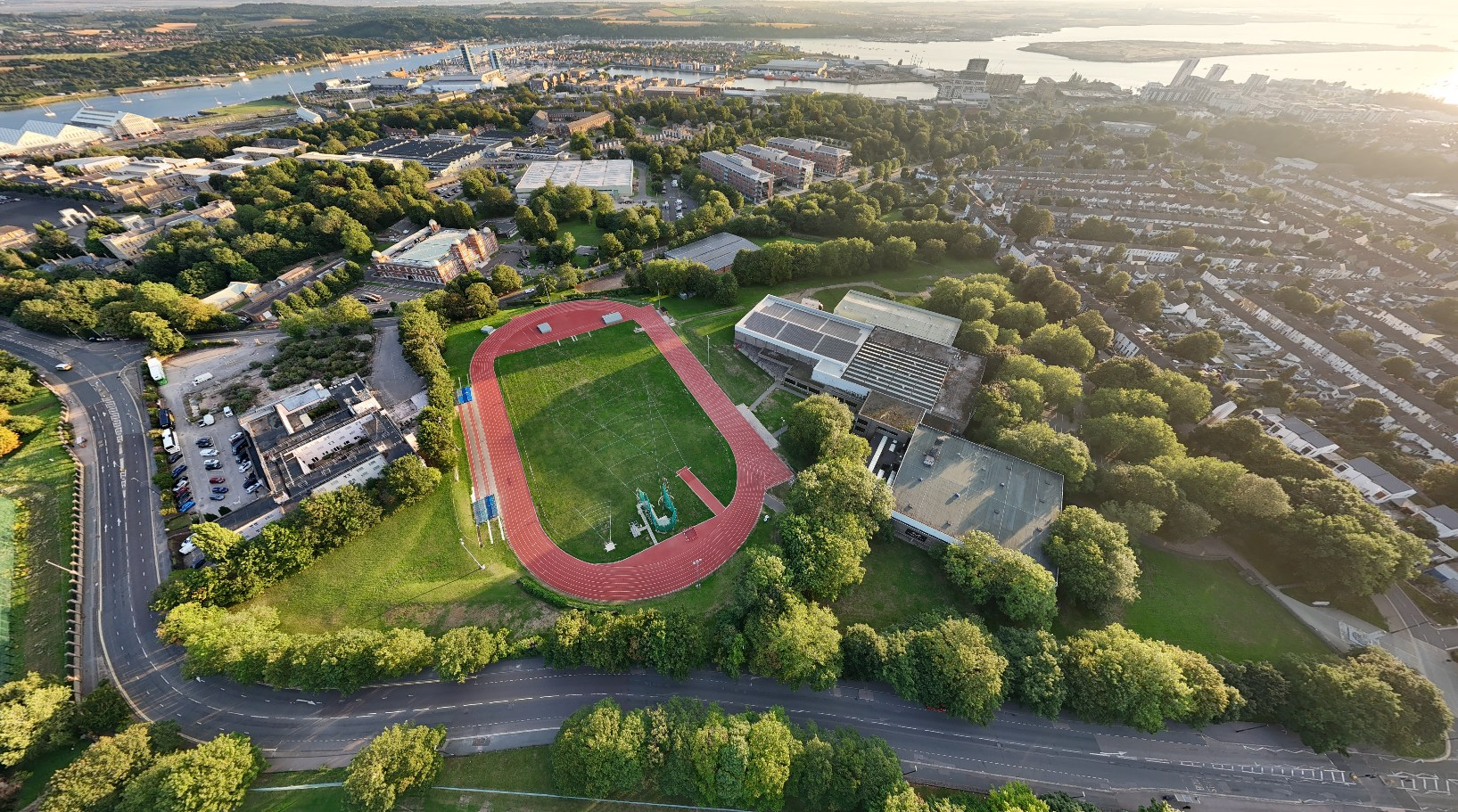
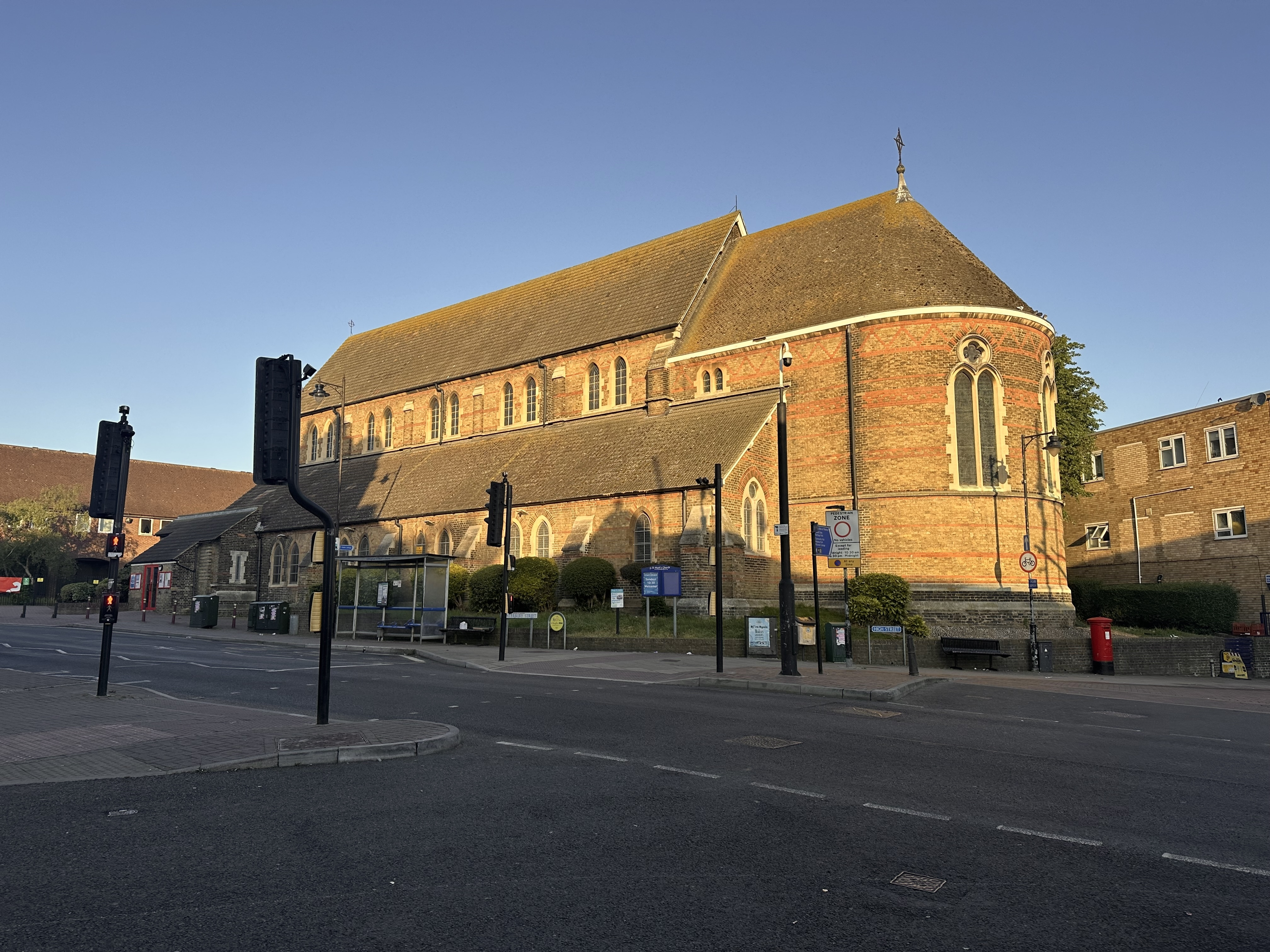
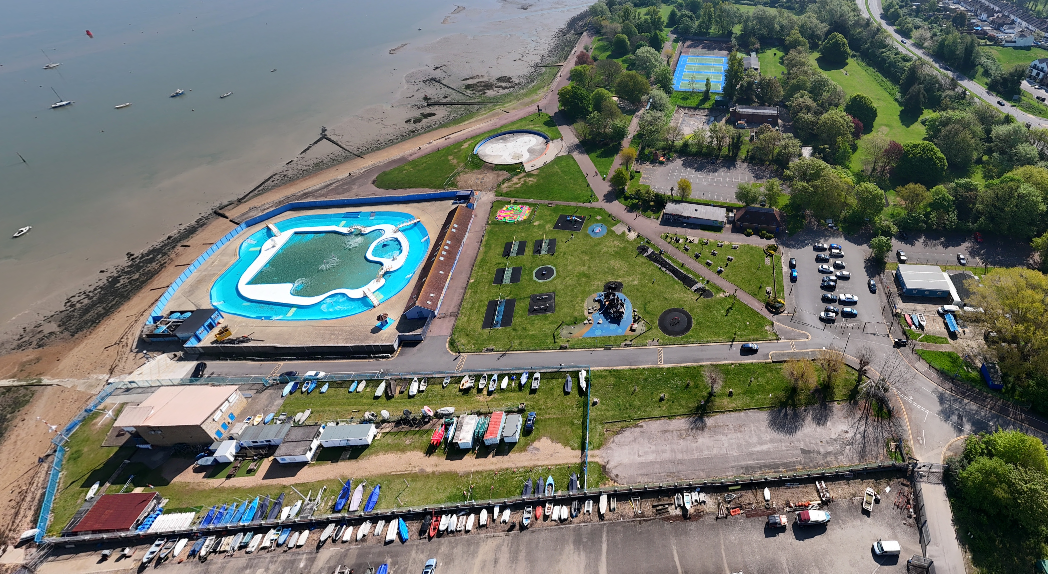
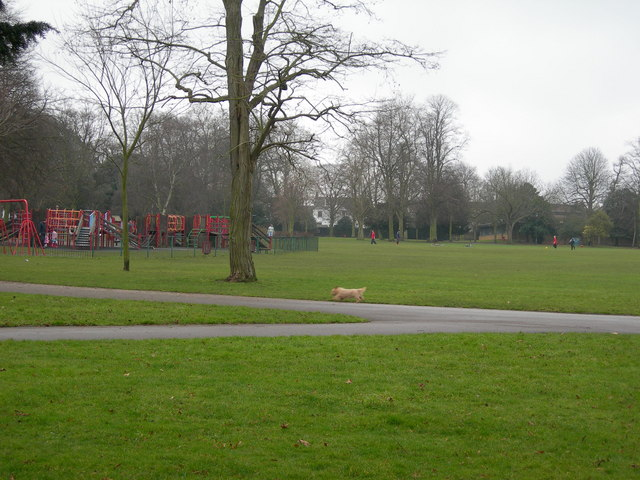
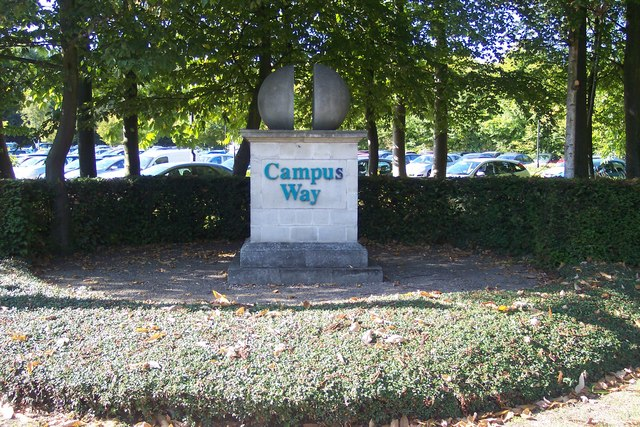
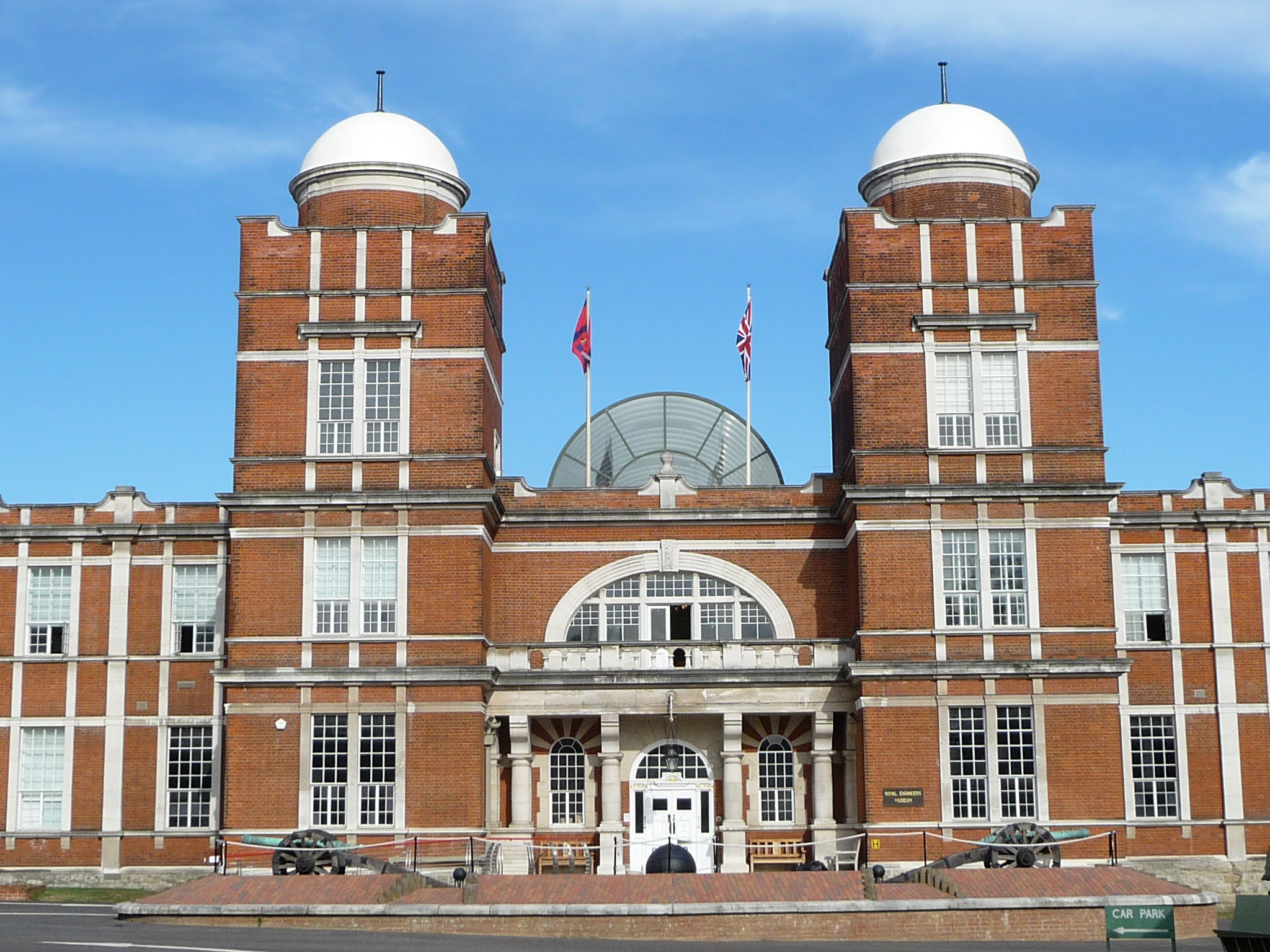
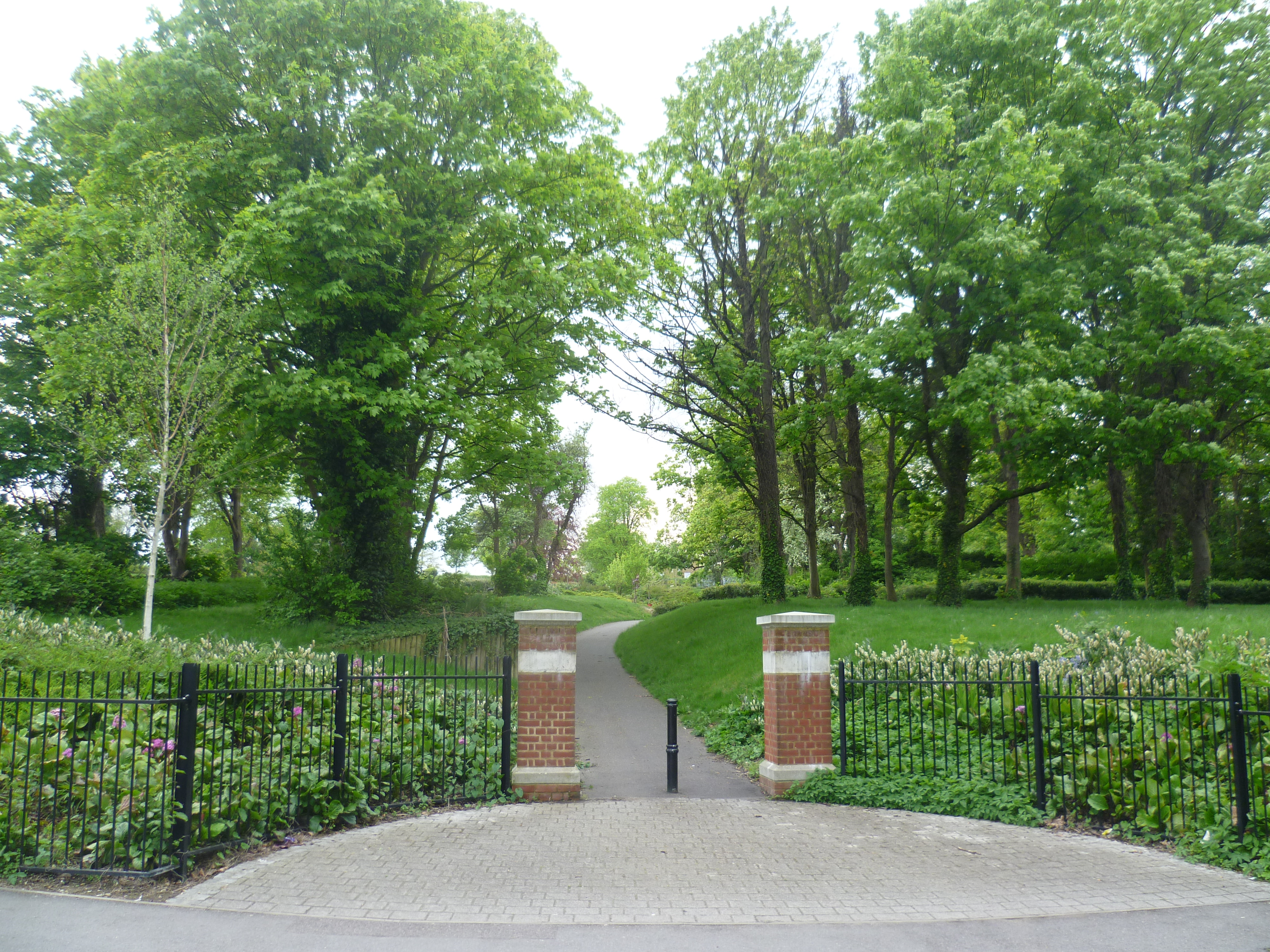
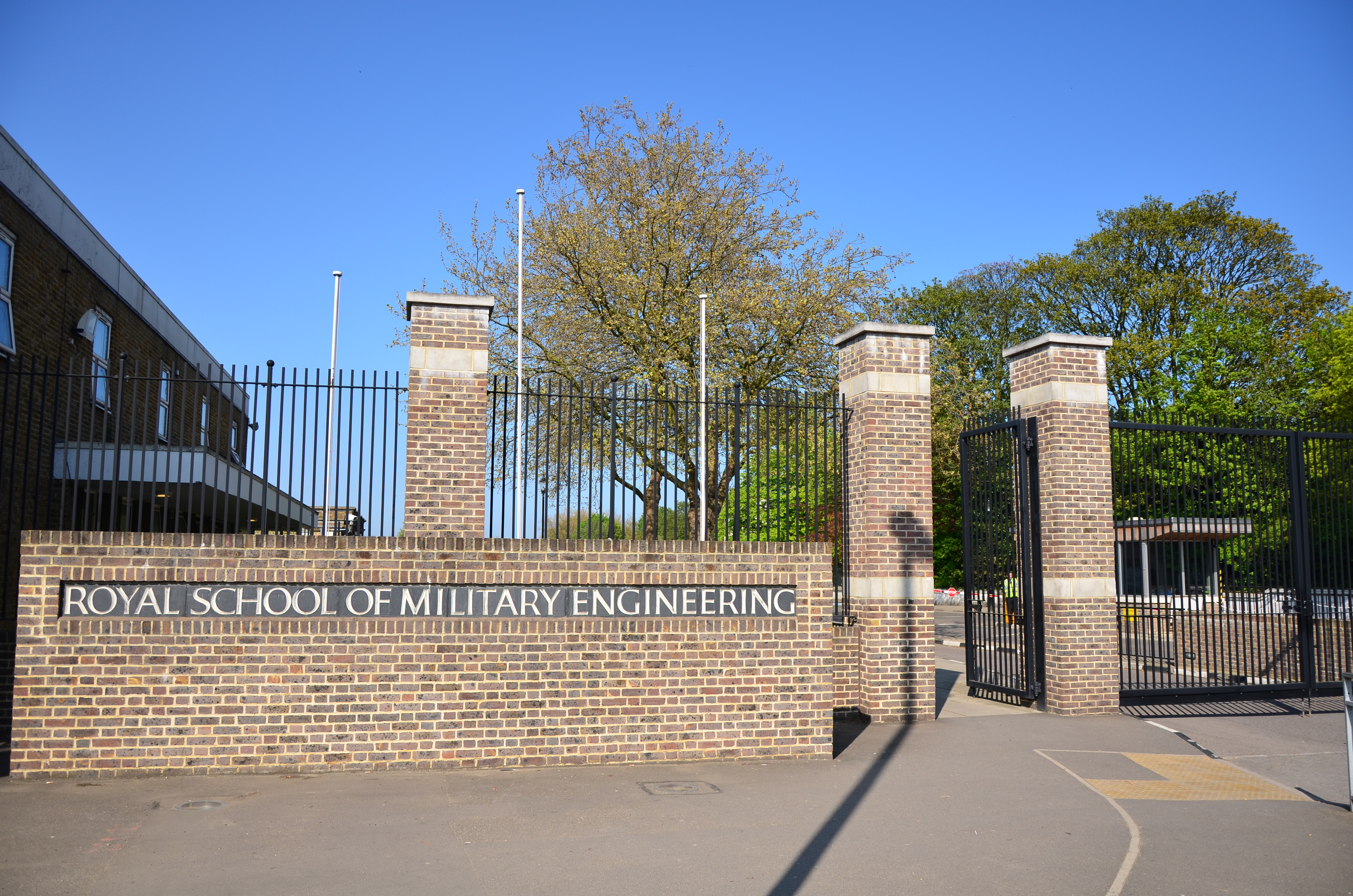
- Gillingham High Street Medway Park Sports Centre St Mark's Church The Strand Gillingham Park Gillingham Business Park Royal Engineers Museum Lower Lines Park Brompton Barracks

- Coat of arms

- Location within Kent
- Population: 108,785
- Language: English
- OS grid reference: TQ775675
  - London: 35.6mi WNW
- Unitary authority: Medway
- Ceremonial county: Kent
- Region: South East
- Country: England
- Sovereign state: United Kingdom
- Post town: GILLINGHAM
- Postcode district: ME7
- Dialling code: 01634
- Police: Kent
- Fire: Kent
- Ambulance: South East Coast
- UK Parliament: Gillingham and Rainham
- Website: Medway Council

Gillingham (/ˈdʒɪlɪŋəm/ JIL-ing-əm) is a town in Kent, England, which forms a conurbation with neighbouring Chatham, Rochester, Strood and Rainham. It is the largest town in the borough of Medway and in 2022 had a population of 111,033.

== Etymology ==
Gillingham's name is of Old English origin, derived from the personal name Gylla (or Gilla) combined with the suffixes -ingas (meaning "the people of" or "family") and -hām ("homestead," "village," or "estate"). Taken together, the name translates to "the homestead of Gylla's people". The names of Gillingham in Dorset and Gillingham in Norfolk have the same etymology, despite the differing pronunciation. Early recordings of the name appear in the Domesday Book (1086) as Gelingeham for Kent.

== Status ==
Before 1894, Gillingham was governed by the parish vestry, Court Leet, and from 1873, a local Board of Health. By 1891, the parish spanned about 5,000 acres with roughly 21,000 residents. The 1894 Local Government Act replaced the Board of Health with the Gillingham Urban District Council, an elected body responsible for local services. The UDC initially had 15 members, three wards (Old Brompton, New Brompton, and Gillingham), and met on Gardiner Street. Key figures included R. H. Cock (chairman), F. C. Boucher (clerk), and the Featherby family, George Featherby, a former brickmaker and councillor, was succeeded by his son John Robert Featherby, who became chairman in 1899. He led the effort for borough status, and when Gillingham became a municipal borough in 1903, Featherby became its first mayor, and the UDC was dissolved.

=== Transition to Gillingham Borough Council ===
After the urban district council was dissolved, Gillingham Borough Council became the local authority body for the area, operating from 1903 until 1 April 1998. It was established by royal charter on 17 August 1903, evolving from the earlier Gillingham Urban District Council, and John Robert Featherby served as its first mayor. The council governed local services for Gillingham and, from 1928, the adjoining parish of Rainham, after its boundaries were expanded.

Unlike neighbouring Medway towns during the 1974 local government reorganisation, Gillingham chose to remain independent as a non‑metropolitan district under Kent County Council, handling local planning, housing and community services, while the county oversaw broader functions.

The council managed local development, infrastructure improvements and civic facilities throughout the 20th century. It was finally abolished in 1998, when it merged with Rochester‑upon‑Medway City Council to form the Medway unitary authority, known today as Medway Council.

=== Municipal buildings ===
The Municipal Buildings in Canterbury Street were built as council offices for Gillingham Borough Council. They were opened by the Lord Mayor of London, Sir George Broadbridge, on 25 September 1937. The Lord Mayor was received at Gillingham Railway Station by a guard of honour of boys of HMS Arethusa. Before the Second World War, air raid sirens were placed on the Municipal Buildings, and the local Civil Defence headquarters were in a single-storey building, to the rear of the car park. In about 1953, beneath part of the car park, Gillingham Borough Control Centre was built underground.

When Gillingham Borough Council later merged with Rochester upon Medway to form the unitary Medway Authority in 1998, the buildings were still used as council offices and for meetings for several years afterwards. Later, Medway Council then moved into the former Lloyd's of London headquarters at Chatham Gun Wharf, and the Municipal Buildings were considered surplus to requirements. They were sold off in 2008 under a contract which turned them into a residential care home.

== Geography ==
The town grew along the road from Brompton on the great lines (military barracks), to the railway station. As such it was a linear development. Close by was the road along the shore line, linking The Strand, and the tiny village of Gillingham Green. Later, communities developed along the top road – Watling Street – turnpike linking Chatham with Dover. All these communities merged into the town that is called today Gillingham.

=== Climate ===
Gillingham experiences an oceanic climate (Köppen climate classification Cfb) similar to almost all of the United Kingdom. Due to its southerly, sheltered, marine position near the European continent the climate is among the warmest in the whole of England.

Climate data for Gillingham (1991–2020)
Month	Jan	Feb	Mar	Apr	May	Jun	Jul	Aug	Sep	Oct	Nov	Dec	Year
Record high °C (°F)	14.8 (58.6)	18.3 (64.9)	22.2 (72.0)	23.9 (75.0)	27.3 (81.1)	32.4 (90.3)	33.9 (93.0)	31.1 (88.0)	31.0 (87.8)	26.1 (79.0)	18.9 (66.0)	16.0 (60.8)	33.9 (93.0)
Mean daily maximum °C (°F)	8.3 (46.9)	8.7 (47.7)	11.4 (52.5)	14.5 (58.1)	17.9 (64.2)	21.1 (70.0)	23.6 (74.5)	22.9 (73.2)	20.2 (68.4)	16.0 (60.8)	11.6 (52.9)	8.8 (47.8)	15.5 (59.9)
Daily mean °C (°F)	5.6 (42.1)	5.6 (42.1)	7.7 (45.9)	10.2 (50.4)	13.2 (55.8)	16.4 (61.5)	18.8 (65.8)	18.4 (65.1)	15.8 (60.4)	12.4 (54.3)	8.5 (47.3)	6.0 (42.8)	11.6 (52.9)
Mean daily minimum °C (°F)	2.8 (37.0)	2.4 (36.3)	4.0 (39.2)	5.9 (42.6)	8.6 (47.5)	11.6 (52.9)	14.0 (57.2)	13.9 (57.0)	11.4 (52.5)	8.7 (47.7)	5.4 (41.7)	3.1 (37.6)	7.7 (45.9)
Record low °C (°F)	−13.4 (7.9)	−10.7 (12.7)	−8.3 (17.1)	−3.3 (26.1)	−1.1 (30.0)	2.2 (36.0)	6.1 (43.0)	4.4 (39.9)	3.5 (38.3)	−0.6 (30.9)	−6.1 (21.0)	−9.4 (15.1)	−13.4 (7.9)
Average precipitation mm (inches)	68.6 (2.70)	45.3 (1.78)	35.9 (1.41)	41.4 (1.63)	45.7 (1.80)	44.0 (1.73)	39.2 (1.54)	46.8 (1.84)	47.9 (1.89)	60.0 (2.36)	66.9 (2.63)	59.9 (2.36)	601.5 (23.68)
Average precipitation days (≥ 1.0 mm)	10.7	8.6	9.3	9.1	8.0	7.8	7.1	7.6	8.4	10.3	11.6	10.6	109.1
Mean monthly sunshine hours	45.8	67.8	111.4	176.6	190.7	197.4	205.0	196.6	159.8	117.2	66.5	51.2	1,586
Source 1: Met Office (precipitation days 1981-2010)
Source 2: Starlings Roost Weather

== History ==
The name Gillingham is recorded in the Domesday Book of 1086. It is said to have been named after a warlord, Gyllingas—from the old English gyllan, meaning "to shout". He was a notable man in Kent history as he led his warriors into battle screaming and shouting. At the time of the Norman Conquest, Gillingham was given to the half-brother of William I of England, Odo, Bishop of Bayeux, who rebuilt the parish church at Gillingham and constructed an Archbishop's Palace on land bordered by Grange Road, the ruins of which could still be seen in the last century. At the time Gillingham itself was a small hamlet, built around the parish church and surrounded by large farm-holdings, of which St. Mark's Parish formed part, being part of Brittain Farm.

William Adams mentioned Gillingham in his writings, saying: "... two English miles from Rochester and one mile from Chatham, where the King's ships do lie". Adams was baptised at Gillingham Parish Church on 24 September 1564.

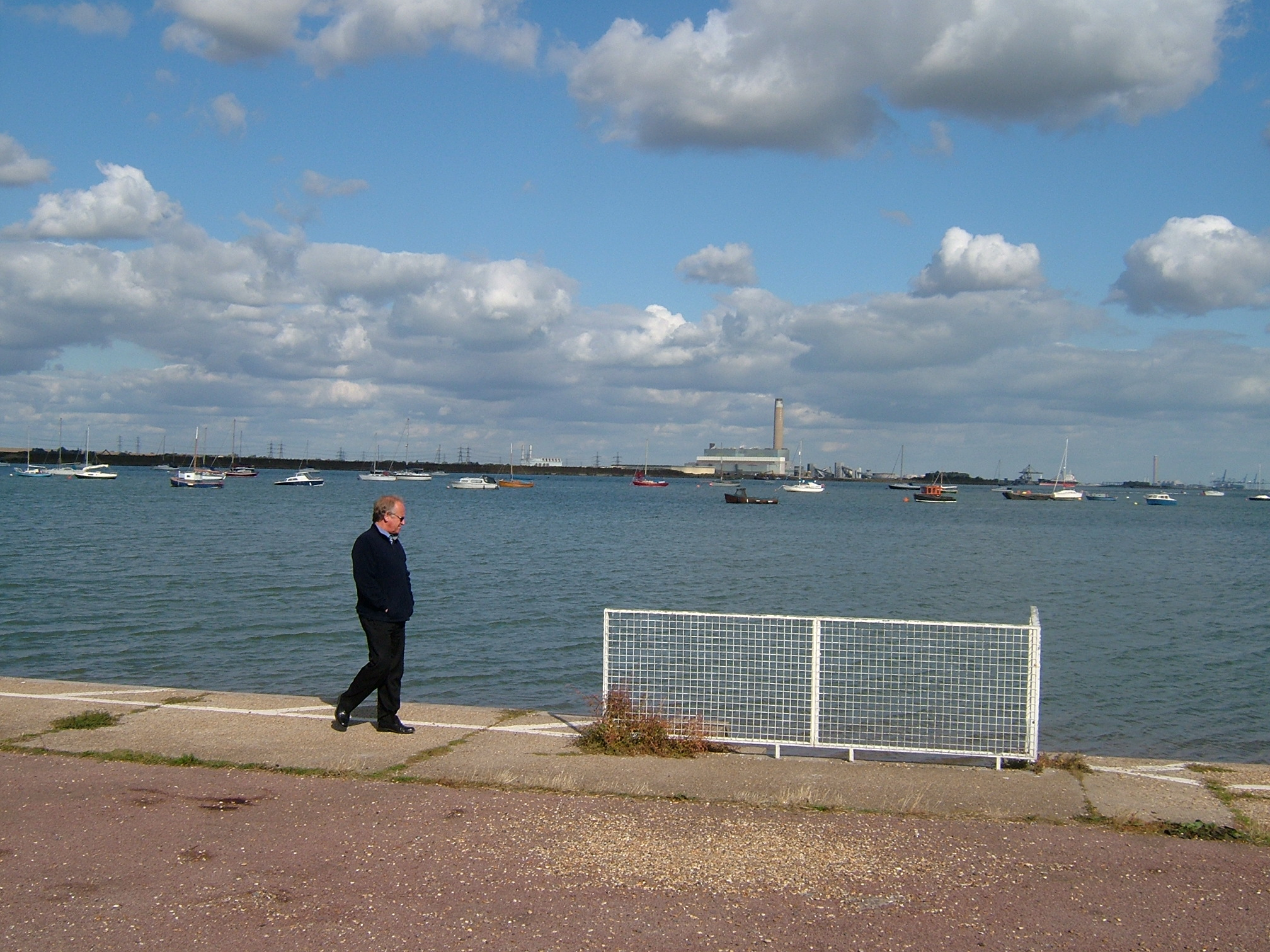
The River Medway estuary at The Strand, Gillingham. The Kingsnorth power stations are on the opposite bank.

The Strand was once owned by the Davenport family in 1635, the Davenport family included a Mayor of Gillingham, pie makers and key holders of Gillingham. The Davenport family had a road named after them in 1920. The Davenport estate was in Ashford, Kent. The estate comprised around 15000 acres and was called The Davenport Manor. The Davenports lost the estate in 1889. The Davenport family were among the investors in the Chatham Dockyard. In medieval times the part of Gillingham known as Grange was a "limb" (junior member) of the Cinque Ports and the maritime importance of the area continued until the late 1940s. Indeed, a large part of Chatham Dockyard lay within Gillingham, and when it was closed in 1984, two-thirds of the then modern-day dockyard lay within the boundaries of Gillingham. The dockyard was founded by Queen Elizabeth I on the site of the present gun wharf, the establishment being transferred to the present site about 1622. In 1667 a Dutch fleet sailed up the River Medway and, having landed at Queenborough on the Isle of Sheppey and laying siege to the fort at Sheerness, invaded Gillingham in what became known as the raid on the Medway. The Dutch eventually retreated, but the incident caused great humiliation to the Royal Navy.

The Seven Years' War began in 1756 and the government immediately gave orders for the defence of the dockyard; by 1758 the Chatham Lines of Defence were built. Over a mile long, they stretched across the neck of the dockyard peninsula, from Chatham Reach, south of the dockyard, across to Gillingham Reach on the opposite side. One of the redoubts on the Lines was at Amherst. The batteries faced away from the dockyard itself to forestall an attack from the landward side; the ships and shore-mounted guns on the river were considered sufficient to protect from that side. The lines of defence are now part of the Great Lines Heritage Park and also the Lower Lines Park (near MidKent College, Gillingham Campus).

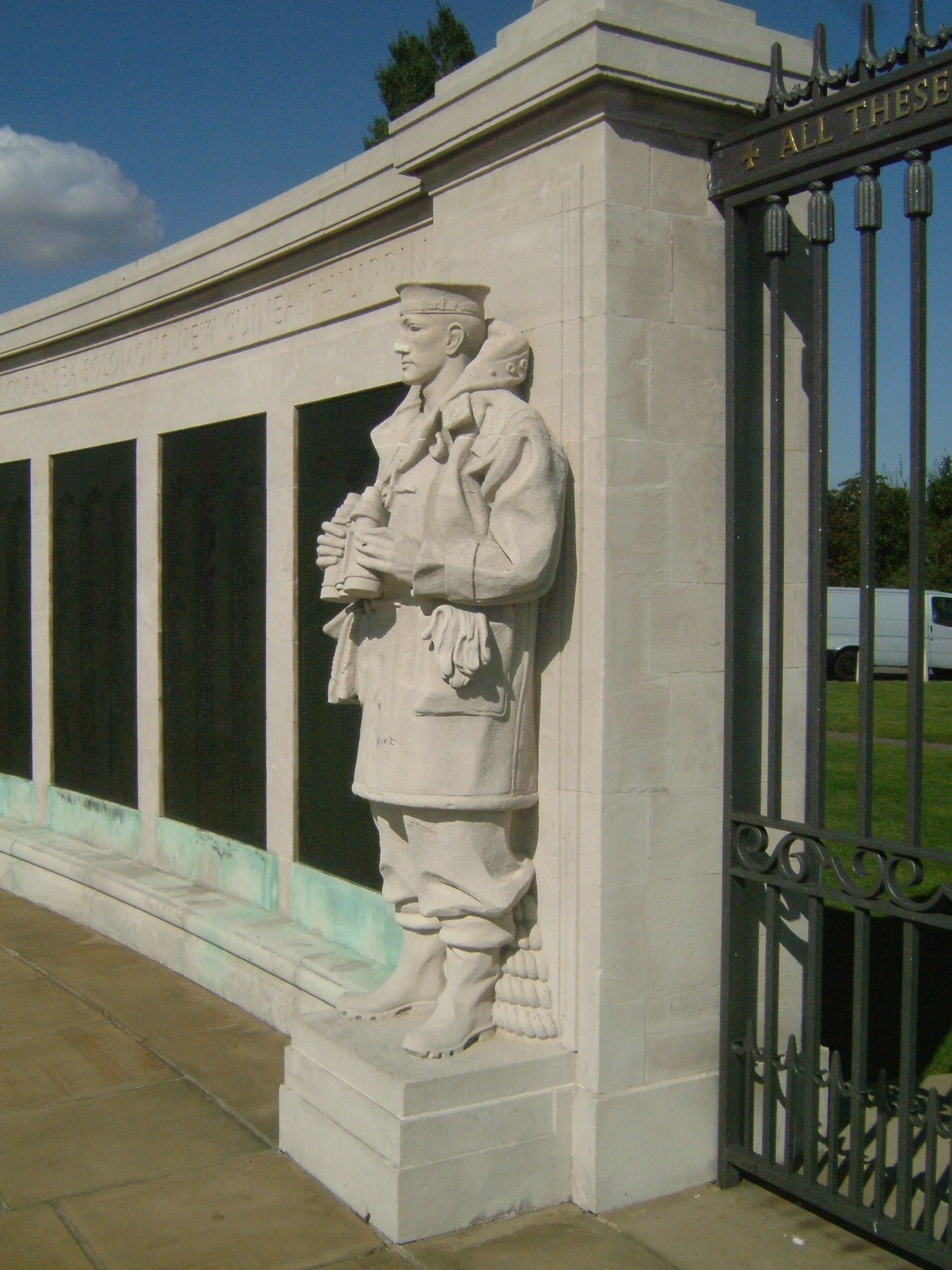
Chatham Naval Memorial on the Gillingham Great Lines

War with France began again in 1778, and once more it was necessary to strengthen the defences. Fort Amherst was the first to be improved; it was followed by work beginning in 1800 to add others at Fort Pitt, Chatham, plus Fort Delce and Fort Clarence (both in Rochester); later in the 19th century others were added, including one at Fort Darland in Gillingham. This work, and the expansion of the dockyard, meant that more homes were needed for the workers. The position of the Lines meant that this building could only happen beyond, and so New Brompton came into being. The population rose to 9,000 people by 1851.

Gillingham was still only a small village; eventually it, too, was swallowed up, and the name of the whole settlement changed to Gillingham. In the 1891 census its population was 27,809, and in 1901, it was 42,530.

In 1919, after World War I, a naval war memorial in the shape of a white stone obelisk was set up on the Great Lines in Chatham. This monument, known as the Chatham Naval Memorial, commemorates members of the Royal Navy who died during the First and Second World Wars and have no known grave. Unveiled on 26 April 1924 by the Prince of Wales (the future King Edward VIII), the memorial originally listed 8,515 names of those lost in World War I. In 1952, an extension was added to commemorate the 10,098 sailors who died in World War II, bringing the total number of names to over 18,500. Designed by Sir Robert Lorimer, the memorial features a rostral obelisk intended as a mark for shipping, symbolizing the naval heritage of Chatham. It is one of three such monuments erected by the Commonwealth War Graves Commission, with similar structures in Portsmouth and Plymouth.

In 1924, a war memorial was unveiled at the junction of Mill Road and Brompton Road in Gillingham to commemorate the borough's fallen from World War I. Designed by sculptor F.W. Doyle-Jones, the Gillingham War Memorial is a stone obelisk featuring sculptural roundels and inscriptions. Later additions honored those lost in World War II and the Korean War. Originally located at the junction, the memorial was relocated in the early 1970s to its current position outside Medway Park Sports Centre. It was granted Grade II listed status in 2016 for its architectural and historic significance.

=== Disasters ===
Gillingham has been the scene of two notable disasters: on 11 July 1929 a public demonstration by Gillingham Fire Brigade went wrong, resulting in 15 fatalities; and in the 1951 Gillingham bus disaster, 24 Royal Marine cadets aged 10 to 13 were killed in a road accident.

== Economy ==
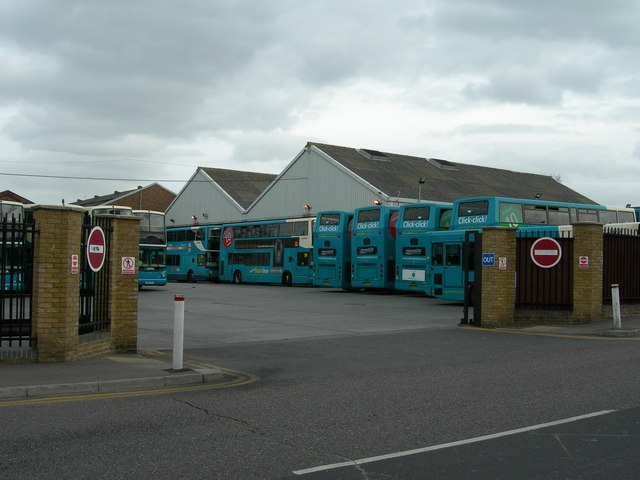
Arriva Southern Counties bus depot in Gillingham

The main source of employment was at Chatham Dockyard, two-thirds of which lay within the boundaries of Gillingham. When it ceased to be a naval base in 1984, there was significant unemployment. A World Heritage Site application has been made for the Dockyard and its defences. Since the 1980s, Gillingham has rebuilt its economic base and the Gillingham Business Park was set up 3 miles (4.8 km) from the town centre, to attract investments and diversify economic activity. The business park and ice rink were an early commission for Grimshaw Architects.

Gillingham has a marina called Gillingham Marina. Gillingham is an important retail centre serving a substantial part of Medway. The town has a large street market in the High Street on Saturdays and Mondays, and is the busiest in the whole of Medway.

== Transport ==
=== Roads ===
The Roman road now known as Watling Street passes through Gillingham; and until the opening of the Medway Towns bypass (the M2 motorway) in the mid-1960s the same route was followed by the traffic on the A2 to Dover. That road had been turnpiked in 1730, as part of the London–Canterbury coaching route.

In June 1996 the Medway Tunnel opened, giving Gillingham a second link to the M2 and Strood.

==== Northern Relief Road (Northern Link) ====
Gillingham Borough Council supported this dual-carriageway scheme from the new tunnel to the A2, designed to divert traffic away from local neighbourhoods. For example, Hansard debate transcripts note the Northern Link would “remove traffic from residential streets such as Woodlands Road and Barnsole Road” and thus bring environmental and safety benefits. Completion of the link (first approved in 1995) was also expected to improve access between Gillingham Business Park and the redeveloped Chatham Maritime area. (In the 1960s GBC likewise supported the construction of the A278 “Hoath Way” linking Gillingham to M2 Junction 4; this opened in 1966 and relieved congestion on the older A2 route.)

=== Railways ===
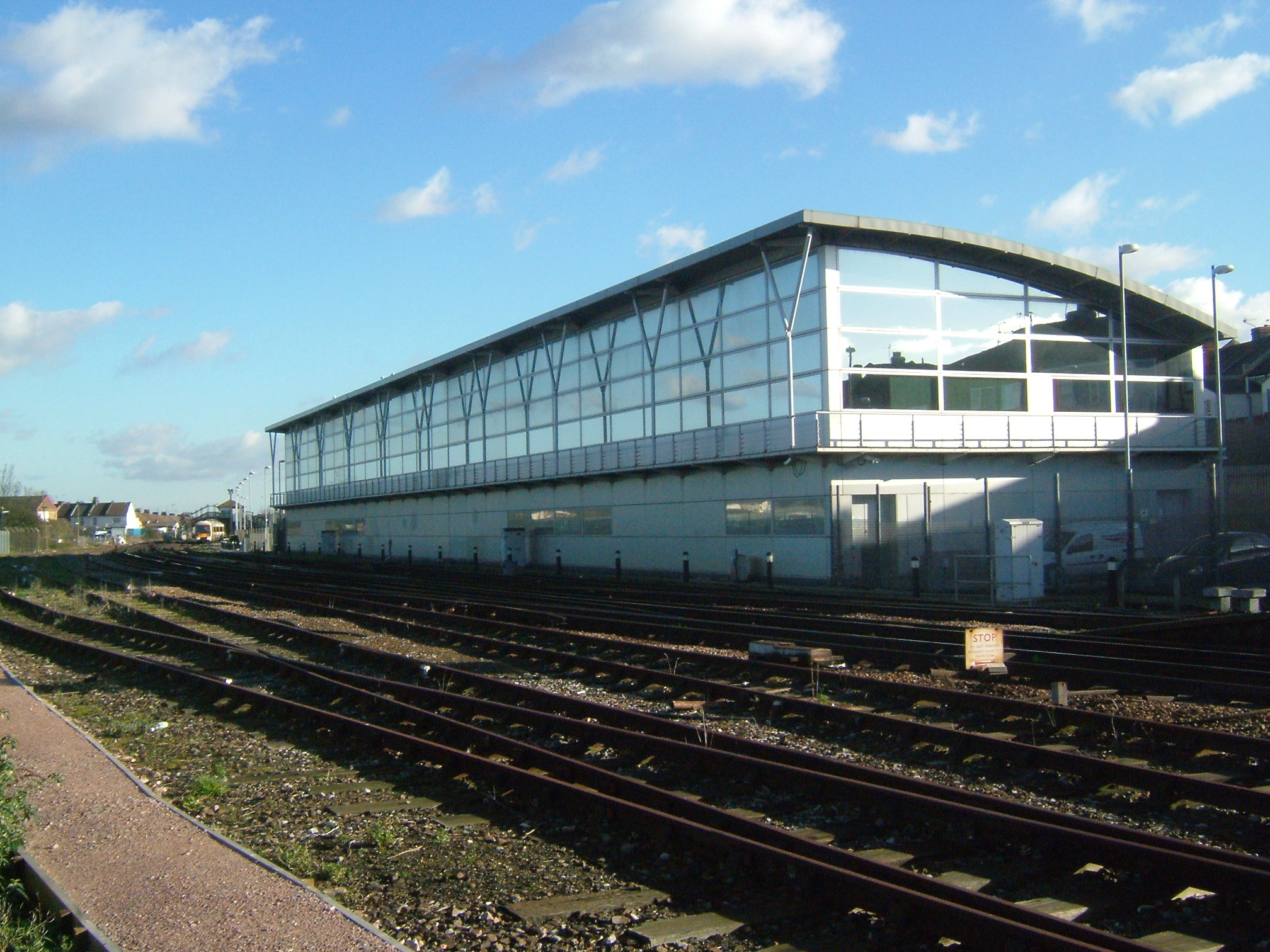
East Kent Signal Centre

The London, Chatham & Dover Railway opened its line between Chatham and Faversham on 25 January 1858; and a country station was opened here called New Brompton. This was to serve the dockyard labourers' homes that had sprung up during the Napoleonic Wars. A branch line led into the dockyard. The station later became Gillingham railway station.

Services improved significantly when in July 1939, Gillingham became the terminus of the electrified system of the Southern Railway.

=== Trams ===
Gillingham was served by an electric tram system operated by the Chatham and District Light Railways Company from 1902 to 1930.

== Culture ==
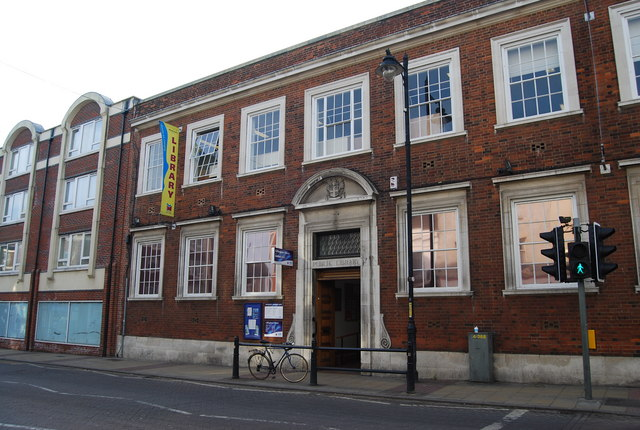
Gillingham Library & Community Hub

=== Library ===
Gillingham Library & Community Hub is located in the High Street.

=== Sport ===
==== Gillingham Football Club ====
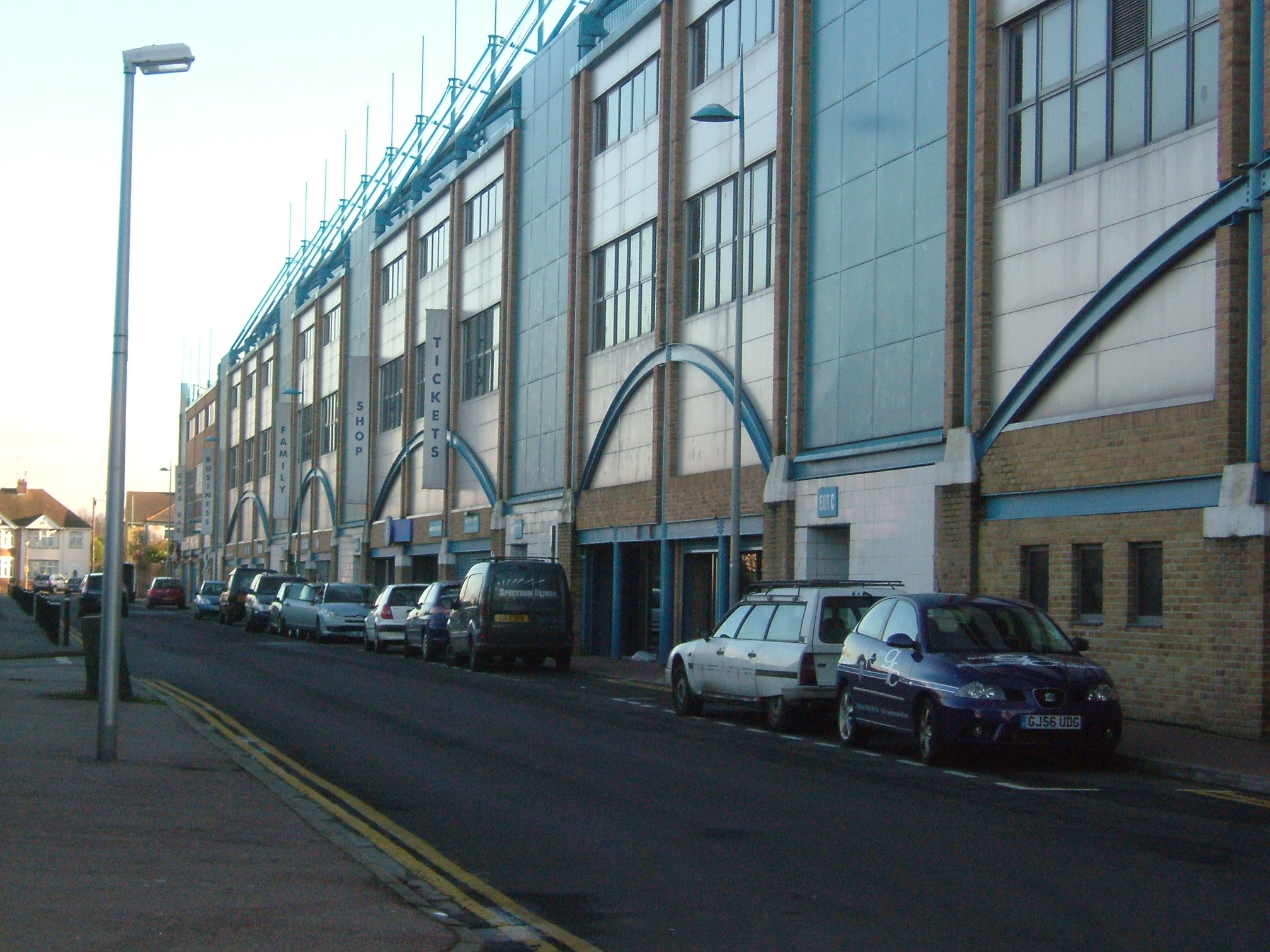
Priestfield Stadium, Home of the Gills

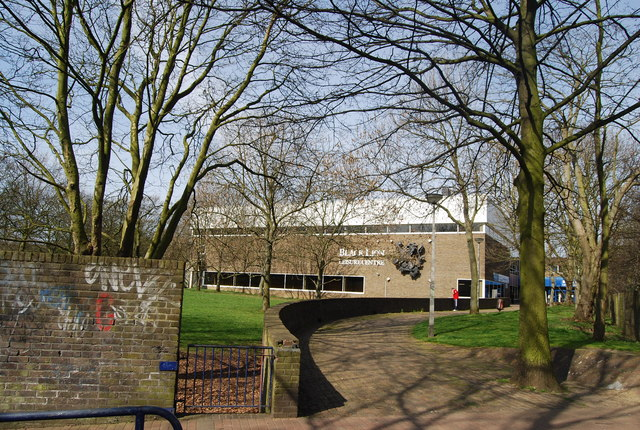
A view of former The Black Lion Leisure Centre (Now Medway Park Sports Centre), April 2009.

The town is home to Gillingham F.C., who play at Priestfield Stadium and were first elected to the Football League in 1920 as members of the new Football League Third Division (south). They were voted out of the league in 1938, only to be re-elected when the league expanded in 1950. They spent the next 50 years moving between the two lower divisions before finally reaching the second tier (then Division One) in the 1999–2000 season after beating Wigan Athletic in the Play-off Final at Wembley. They spent five years at this level before being relegated twice, and in 2013–22 played in League One (third tier), into which they were promoted after winning their first championship for fifty years in the 2012–13 season under manager Martin Allen. They were relegated to EFL League Two in 2022.

==== Ice hockey ====
There are senior men's and women's as well as junior teams that play at Planet Ice - Gillingham, including the Invicta Dynamos, a semi-professional men's team that currently plays in the National Ice Hockey League in NIHL South Division 1 (third-tier of British ice hockey), the Invicta Mustangs who play in NIHL South Division 2 (fourth-tier), and the Invicta Dynamics who play in the Women's National Ice Hockey League in Division 2 South after winning their conference in the 2025-26 season. There are also several junior and recreational teams as well as skating and ice hockey courses and public skating sessions available at the rink.

==== Medway Park Sports Centre ====
The area boasts a sub-regional sports complex called Medway Park Sports Centre with three indoor pools for swimming and SCUBA diving, gym, sports hall and squash courts also in the same area is Jumpers Rebound Centre for trampolining a world-famous facility for the sport.

==== The Strand Lido & Leisure Park ====
There is an outdoors sporting centre located at the Strand which provides sailing and motor boat courses for both adults and children. The Strand Leisure Park has an open-air swimming pool on the banks of the River Medway as well as other leisure attractions including tennis courts and a narrow-gauge railway.

Gillingham Ice Bowl is the home ice rink for Kent's premier Ice Hockey Club, the Invicta Dynamos, who were originally called the Medway Bears. The Ice Bowl was officially opened by Queen Elizabeth II in 1984.

==== Modern Pentathlon World Cup 2010 ====
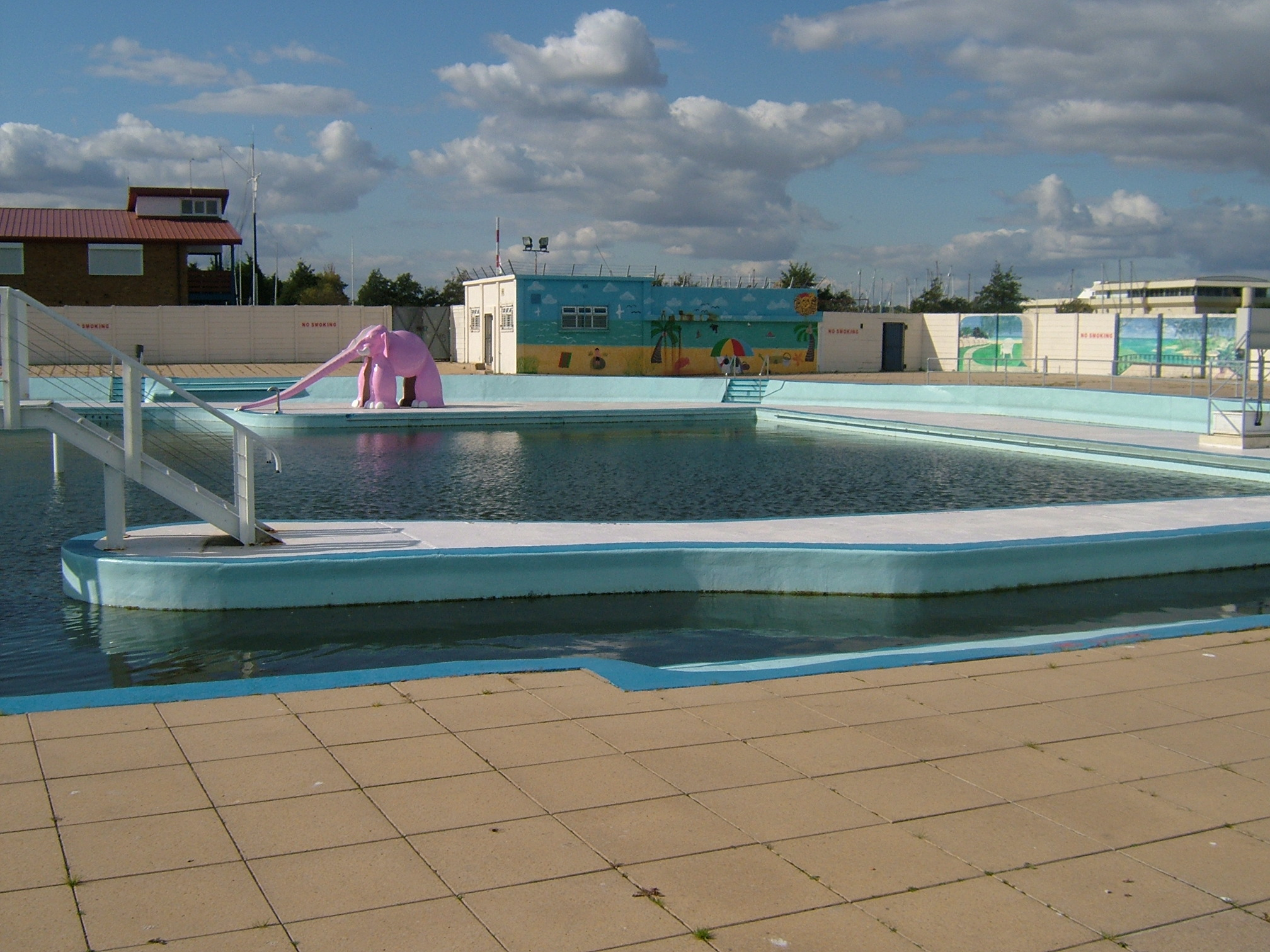
The open-air swimming pool at The Strand

The Medway Park leisure centre (formerly the Black Lion) hosted the Modern Pentathlon World Cup. In the Women's Final, it was won by Amelie Caze of France, Donata Rimsaite of Lithuania got Silver (2nd place) and Mhairi Spence of Great Britain got Bronze (3rd place). In the Men's Final, it was won by Ádám Marosi of Hungary, Ondrej Polivka (Czech Republic) got Silver and Alexander Lesun (Russia) claimed the Bronze.

==== Modern Pentathlon European Championships 2011 ====
These were also held in Medway Park. Andrei Moiseev (of Russia) got Gold for the Men's Final, Serguei Karyakin (also of Russia) got Silver and Dmytro Kirpulyanskyy (of Ukraine) got the Bronze. James Cooke of GB was a close fourth. In the Women's Final, Lena Schoneborn (of Germany) got Gold, Adrienn Tóth (of Hungary) got Silver and Victoria Tereshuk (of Ukraine) claimed Bronze.

==== Rugby league ====
Medway Dragons Rugby League Football Club is based in Brompton having been founded in 2007. The Dragons run teams from Under 6 to Masters (over 35) and a Wheelchair rugby league Team. The First Grade have a fine history and won the London & The South Championships in 2016 and 2021. They are the current holders of the Harry Jepson Trophy.

== Local media ==
=== Television ===
Local news and television programmes are provided by BBC South East and ITV Meridian from the Bluebell Hill TV transmitter.

=== Newspapers ===
Local newspapers for Gillingham include the Medway Messenger, published by the KM Group. The area also has free newspapers in the Medway Extra (KM Group) and yourmedway (KOS Media).
In 2011, Medway News and Medway Standard, both published by Kent Regional News and Media, closed down.

=== Radio ===
The local commercial radio station for Gillingham is KMFM Medway, owned by the KM Group. Medway is also served by community radio station Radio Sunlight. The area can also receive the county wide stations BBC Radio Kent, Heart and Gold and Smooth, as well as many radio stations in Essex and Greater London.

== Education ==
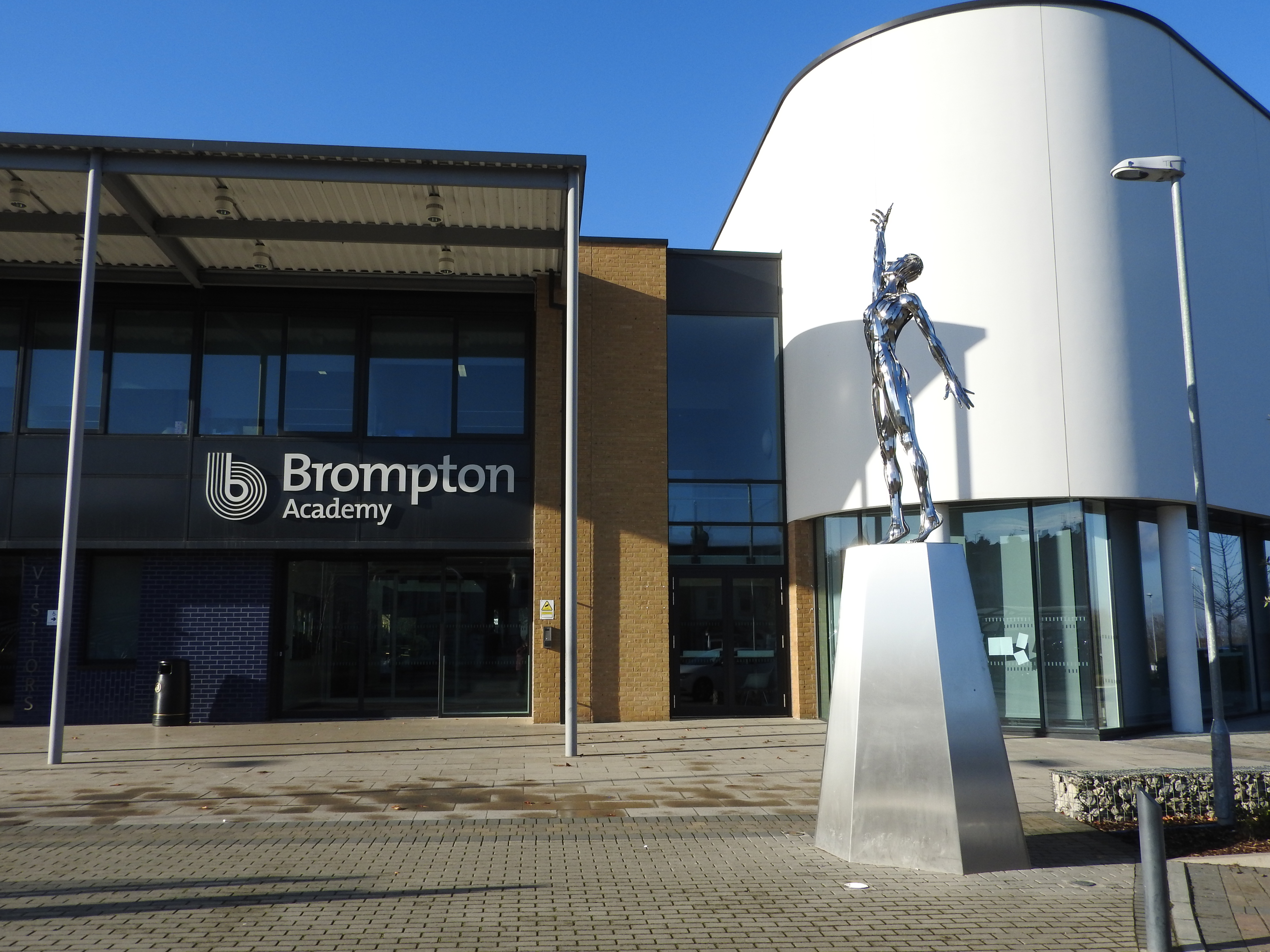
Brompton Academy (Upbury Manor School), the entrance

The Gillingham Boys Grammar School, which was opened in 1923, later became The Howard School in 1975, when it merged with the Rainham Campus secondary school for boys. Other secondary schools include Rainham Mark Grammar School (formerly the Gillingham Technical School), Brompton Academy (formerly New Brompton College and before that Upbury Arts College, Upbury Manor), Rainham Girls School, Chatham Grammar School for Girls and the Robert Napier School. There are also three primary schools in the small residential area called Twydall: Twydall Infant School, Twydall Junior School and St Thomas of Canterbury R.C. School. In Gillingham itself are St. Mary's, Barnsole Road, Woodlands, Saxonway Primary School, Byron, and Napier Community Primary Schools. In Wigmore, there is the Fairview Infants and Junior Schools and in Hempstead, the Hempstead Infant and Junior Schools.

Gillingham also hosts MidKent College, a Further Education College which introduced Higher Education courses in 2012 and Universities at Medway, a university campus complex comprising University of Kent, Canterbury Christ Church University and University of Greenwich on the former HMS Pembroke barracks buildings.

See List of schools in Medway for a full list of schools serving Gillingham and the Medway area.

== Religion ==
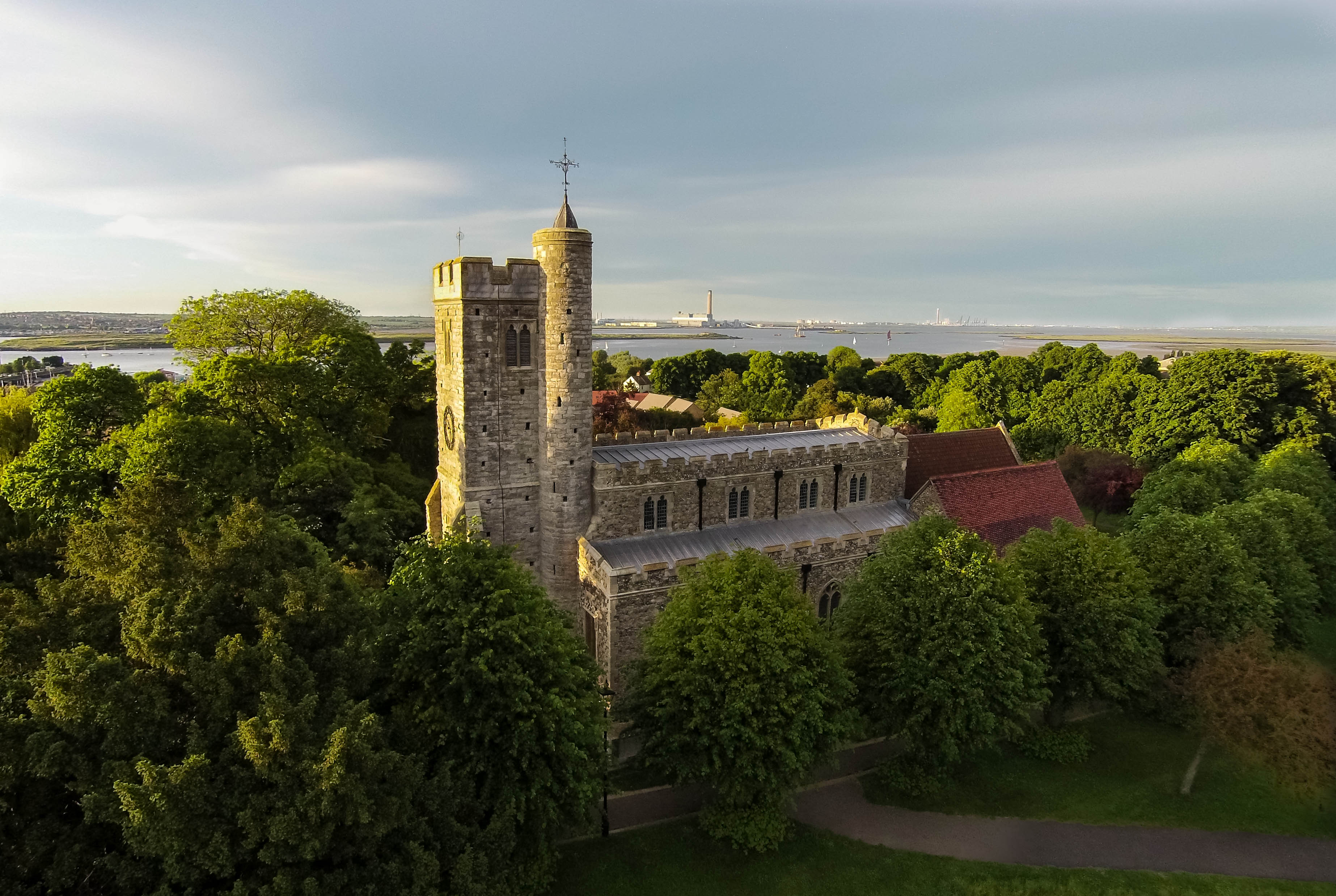
A view of St Mary Magdelene Church

Within Gillingham there are many churches from different Christian denominations. There are three Church of England churches: the historic parish church of St. Mary Magdalene; the evangelical St. Mark's; and St. Augustine's. There are also Baptist, Methodist and Roman Catholic churches.

The Parish Church of St Mary Magdalene ("The Church on the Green"),) is the oldest building in Gillingham and Grade II* Listed. The Normans built the church in the early 13th century, then in the 15th century a tower was added. More extensions were added during the 14th century. In 1700, Philip Wightman was commissioned to cast and hang a ring of five bells, to the tower. Then in 1737, Richard Phelps added another bell to complete a ring of six. Edward Hasted refers to it in 1798, 'three isles and three chancels, with a handsome tower steeple at the west end'. In 1811, Thomas Mears added two treble bells to make eight. In 1868, architect Sir Arthur Blomfield restored the church and tower and to mark the completion of the restoration, the firm of Heaton, Butler and Bayne replaced the stained glass in the east window, based on a design by Henry Holiday.

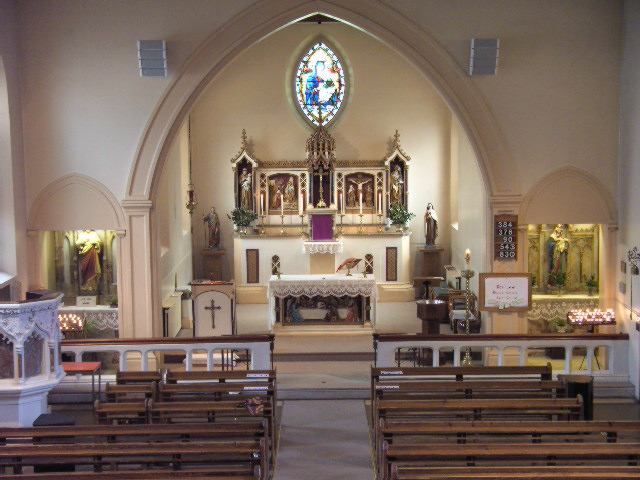
A view of Our Lady of Gillingham Catholic Church

In 1896, Our Lady of Gillingham Roman Catholic Church was built close to Saint Mary Magdalene Church, and overlooks the River Medway.

It followed after other Roman Catholic churches in the area, the closest, St Michael's in Chatham (built 1863). Our Lady of Gillingham was built on the town of New Brompton, as Gillingham was then called, to mainly cater for the new workforce – those employed at Chatham Dockyard. The church itself was started in 1890, and was completed by 1896, being opened on 12 May 1896.

A local Roman Catholic school was established on the site of the church in 1894. The schoolrooms were used until 1972, when the infant section of the school relocated to nearby Greenfield Road. In 1988, after more building work on the new site, the whole school was reunited on its new site at Greenfield Road. The church (Our Lady of Gillingham) celebrated its centenary in May 1996, two years after the local school.

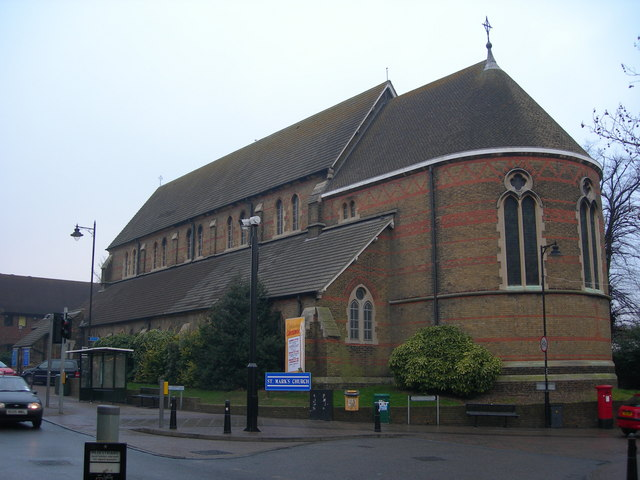
St. Mark Church

Gillingham also has the Jāmi’ah mosque and a Hindu Sabha Mandir. Originally established in 1975, the Nasir Mosque on Richmond road is the first purpose-built mosque in the town, constructed in 2014.

James Jershom Jezreel, founder of the Jezreelite sect which flourished in the area during the 19th century, began the building of Jezreel's Tower on Chatham Hill. The tower was never completed but stood until its demolition in 1961. There is still a Jezreels Road off Watling Street. The tower was painted by Tristram Hillier in 1937 as part of a series of posters for Royal Dutch Shell. A copy is held in Tate Britain.

== Military ==
Brompton Barracks have long been the home of the Royal Engineers. Today Gillingham is home to the Royal Engineers Museum.

== Gillingham High Street ==
Gillingham High Street is a principal shopping and commercial area in Gillingham, a town within the unitary authority of Medway in Kent, England. Historically, it has functioned as a local centre for trade, retail, and civic activity.

=== History ===
Gillingham High Street developed as the principal commercial street in the town, aided by its proximity to the River Medway. In the 14th century, Gillingham was granted a charter permitting a weekly market, and the street subsequently became a site for trade and commerce. The town's location near Chatham Dockyard contributed to its growth during the 16th and 17th centuries, with economic activity influenced by naval and maritime industries.

==== 19th and early 20th century ====
During the 19th and early 20th centuries, the High Street expanded in response to population growth and industrial activity in the surrounding area. A range of retail outlets, public houses, and service businesses operated along the street. The opening of Gillingham railway station in 1858 improved connectivity and supported commercial development.

==== Mid-20th century ====
By the mid-20th century, the High Street included several national retailers, including Marks & Spencer, LeFevre's, Littlewoods, and Woolworths. These businesses were part of a broader national retail landscape and contributed to the street's role in the town's economy. However, from the 1960s onwards, emerging trends such as the growth of suburban shopping centres began to impact traditional retail streets.

==== Late 20th century and decline ====
From the 1970s, Gillingham High Street experienced reduced footfall, influenced by the development of out-of-town retail centres such as Hempstead Valley Shopping Centre, which opened in 1978. Efforts to pedestrianise parts of the street were implemented, but several long-established retailers including Marks & Spencer and LeFevre's closed during this period. These changes reflected broader shifts in retail and consumer behaviour.

==== 21st century ====
In the 21st century, Gillingham High Street continued to face challenges, including competition from online retailers, changing consumer patterns, and ongoing economic pressures. Many national chain stores closed, and some premises became vacant. While a number of independent businesses have remained, investment in the street has been limited. Concerns over crime and anti-social behaviour have also affected perceptions of the area.

Minor improvements have been made to the streetscape and pedestrian infrastructure, though no large-scale regeneration has taken place. The High Street remains subject to wider economic and social trends affecting many similar town centres in the United Kingdom.

=== Notable businesses ===
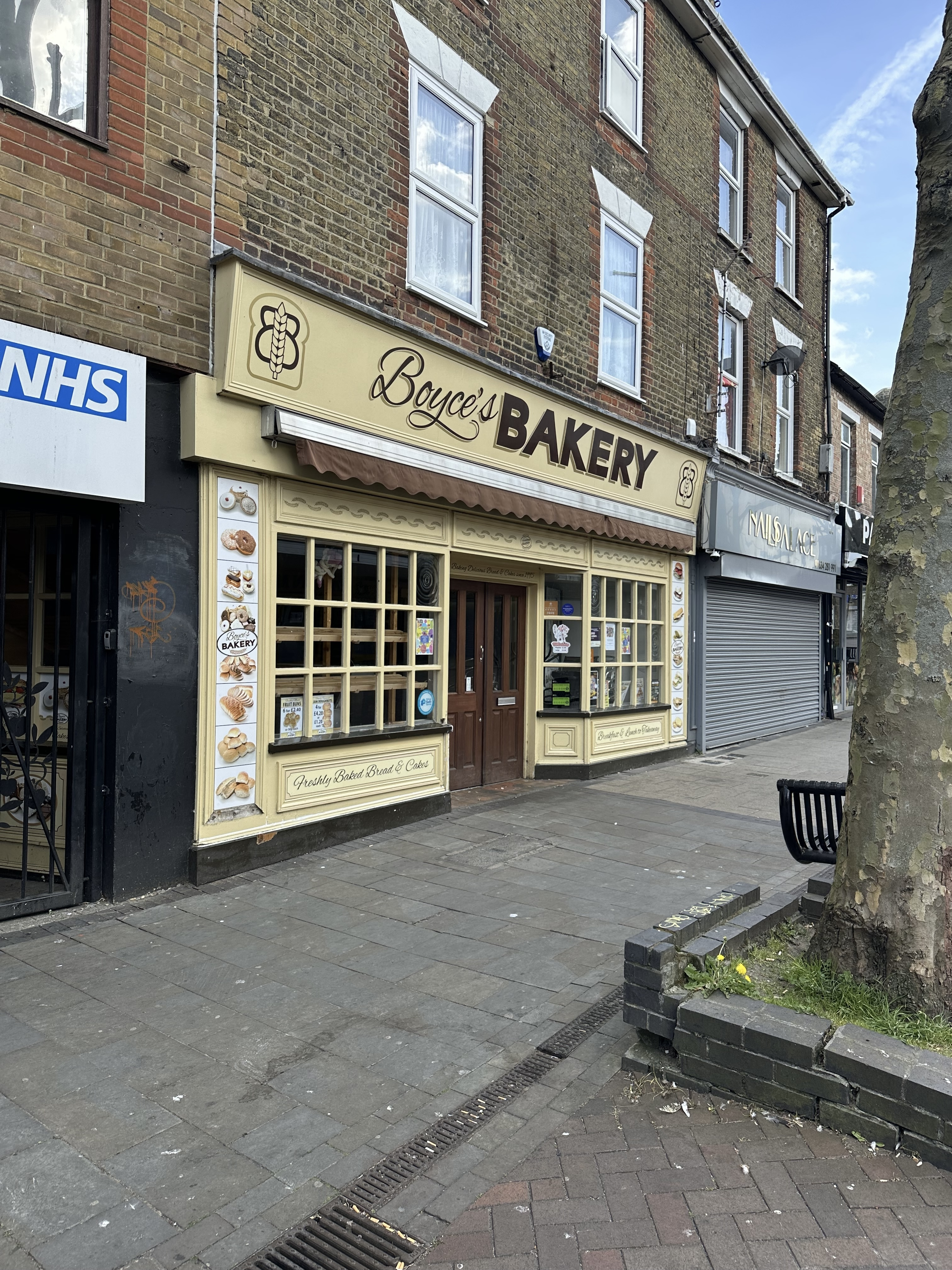
Boyce's Bakery sits on the western end on the High Street, next to Britton Farm Mall.

Over the years, several well-known businesses have operated along the High Street, including:

- Marks & Spencer: A significant retailer that was once a staple of the area.
- Woolworths: A variety store that operated for many years.
- Littlewoods: A department store offering a wide range of products, a major presence before its closure.
- The Co-op Department Store: A long-standing provider of a range of goods.
- Clarks Bakery: A former local bakery which operated in the area.
- The Ritzy Nightclub: Known by several names, including The Pavilion, Joanna's, and MooMoo, this nightclub was a fixture of Gillingham's nightlife scene until its closure in 2019 and demolition in 2023.
- The Gillingham Conservative Club: Opened on 7 June 1994 and still operating as a social venue for local members.
- WHSmith: Opened on 6 July 1989 and closed on 8 January 2022.
- Superdrug: Opened on 3 October 1994 and closed on 10 June 2022.
- J C Rook & Sons: Opened on 28 July 2006 and closed on 25 July 2022 after the company went into administration.
- F Hinds Jewellers: Opened on 2 August 1989 and closed on 11 May 2023.
- McDonald's: The McDonald's restaurant located on Gillingham High Street closed permanently on 31 July 2018. Prior to its closure, the restaurant had implemented a policy banning individuals under the age of 21 from dining inside after 3 pm, due to incidents of anti-social behaviour in the area. This measure was part of McDonald's efforts to maintain a safe and welcoming environment for all customers and staff. Despite being a popular outlet, McDonald's decided to close the location, with staff being offered relocation to nearby stores. The closure left a significant gap in the High Street, as the store was a popular and heavily frequented location that attracted both local customers and passersby. This has led to concerns about what might replace it and how it impacts the area's foot traffic, particularly with other shops along the High Street benefitting from the business it generated.

=== Love Gillingham campaign ===
Love Gillingham, launched in 2024, is a community regeneration initiative coordinated by Medway Council and supported by Naushabah Khan, the Member of Parliament for Gillingham and Rainham, aimed at revitalising the town centre through community engagement, economic development, and public space improvements, addressing challenges such as vacant retail units (6.2% vacancy rate compared to a 16% national average), cleanliness, and safety concerns. The Gillingham Taskforce, established by Khan in 2024, includes Medway Council, Kent Police, and Medway Norse, focusing on issues like waste management (91 littering fines issued from July 2024 to January 2025), green spaces, housing, and business investment, with a community clean-up planned for spring 2025. The Gillingham Community Panel, facilitated by Design South-East and BPTW, involved 40 residents and business owners in workshops from November 2024 to February 2025, concluding on 1 February 2025, to inform the Gillingham Town Centre Action Plan, expected for public consultation in 2025. The "Big Day Out" event in September 2024, attended by over 2,500 people, was set to return on 20 July 2025 alongside the Medway Mile on 18 July 2025, featuring performances and stalls. Gillingham Community Hub and Library, opened in 1902 and Medway's busiest library, offers council services, printing, scanning, and Wi-Fi, with plans for a dedicated initiative-related section. Local businesses like Journey's Made, which received £14,000 from the Shared Prosperity Fund and a green growth grant in 2024, and Unravel and Unwind, a community interest company active in the Community Panel, are supported, alongside efforts to repurpose vacant units. The Truro Manor project, led by Medway Development Company, was projected to deliver 44 affordable rental flats by spring 2025 through Medway's Homechoice system. Public safety measures include enforcing a ban on private e-scooter use in public spaces like Gillingham High Street, with Medway opting out of national e-scooter trials. Additional funding includes £14,000 for the Celebrating St Alban's project and £5,000 for a Gillingham Design Code feasibility study. The initiative engages residents via a newsletter, Medway Council's website, social media, with Khan managing nearly 2,000 constituent cases since 2024 and holding monthly drop-in surgeries.

=== Open Lines Project ===
The Gillingham Open Lines Project is a proposed regeneration scheme developed by Medway Council in collaboration with Peel L&P, submitted in 2022 as part of a bid for nearly £20 million in funding through Round 2 of the UK Government's Levelling Up Fund. The project proposes the creation of a 1.4-kilometre pedestrian and cycle route, referred to as "The Greenway" along the disused Gillingham to Chatham Dockyard Railway Link in Gillingham, Kent.

The greenway is intended to improve connections between Gillingham Waterfront and Gillingham town centre, linking key sites such as Chatham Waters, the University Technical College (UTC), and local university campuses. In addition to the main route, the wider proposals include improvements to Railway Street, enhancements to Gillingham High Street, including landscaping, new cycle infrastructure, and upgraded public spaces, and the development of a green skills hub focused on training in engineering, construction, and manufacturing.

As part of the project's development, a public consultation was held between 30 May and 10 June 2022, involving five public engagement events and a workshop at Burnt Oak Primary School. The consultation received 192 responses, with 84% of respondents stating they would be more likely to walk or cycle using traffic-free routes, and 90% indicating they would use the proposed greenway. In response to concerns raised during consultation, including safety and accessibility, the proposals were updated to include CCTV coverage, improved lighting, and child-friendly infrastructure, such as play areas and safer routes to schools.

According to Medway Council, the aims of the project include improving local connectivity, supporting economic growth, enhancing air quality, and promoting sustainable travel across the area. As of mid 2025, the outcome of the funding application had not yet been announced.

== Notable people associated with Gillingham ==
- William Adams – nautical adventurer, advisor to Tokugawa Ieyasu, western samurai
- Ryan Bertrand – UEFA Champions League winner with Chelsea FC
- Sarah Forbes Bonetta – princess and god-daughter to Queen Victoria, lived for six years in Palm Cottage, Canterbury Street.
- Louis Brennan – engineer and inventor
- Kathleen Courtney – suffragist and peace campaigner
- William Cuffay – chartist
- Nicholas Day – actor
- H. D. Everett, novelist, born in Gillingham
- David Frost – television presenter
- Tirzah Garwood – artist
- Hector Gray GC – RAF officer posthumously awarded the George Cross for conduct under torture by the Japanese army in 1943
- John Hartnell – explorer on Franklin's lost expedition to find the Northwest Passage
- David Harvey – eminent human geographer
- Verena Holmes – inventor and engineer
- Jack Hues – musician, most notably as the lead singer of new wave band Wang Chung
- James Jordan – professional dancer, appears on Strictly Come Dancing
- James McCudden – World War I flying ace
- Fernley Marrison – first-class cricketer and British Army officer
- Brian Moore – sport commentator and journalist
- Dee Murray – bass player with Elton John
- Paul Nihill – four-time Olympian, European champion, Olympic silver medallist and world record holding racewalker
- Stel Pavlou – novelist and screenwriter
- Gary Rhodes – chef and restaurateur
- Vaughan Smith – journalist (founder of Frontline Club), organic farmer who is giving refuge to Julian Assange
- Balvinder Sopal – actress (EastEnders), brought up in Gillingham
- R. N. Taber – poet and novelist
- Rosemary Tonks, poet and novelist, born in Gillingham
- Rik Waller – singer, seen on reality TV show Pop Idol in 2003
- Dr Lorna Wing – psychiatrist and autism researcher and campaigner
- River Medway – drag queen, appeared on RuPaul's Drag Race UK

== Twin towns ==
- — Ito and Yokosuka (Japan)

== See also ==
- Gillingham Borough Council elections for the political history of the borough covering the town which was abolished in 1998.
- Listed buildings in Medway, non civil parish (Chatham, Gillingham, Rainham) for a list of listed buildings.
