= Leona May Peirce =

American mathematician (1863–1954)

- Born: August 4, 1863; Norway, Maine
- Died: September 24, 1954 (aged 91); Springfield, Massachusetts
- Education: Smith College; Yale University
- Occupations: Mathematician, educator

Leona May Peirce (August 4, 1863 – September 24, 1954) was an American mathematician who was denied her doctorate at Cornell, but persevered to finish her PhD at Yale in 1899. She was one of the few women to earn a doctorate in the United States in mathematics before World War II.

== Biography ==
Peirce was born August 4, 1863, in Norway, Maine to Mary Hobbs Foster and Levi Merriam Peirce, a music dealer. She earned her bachelor's degree from Smith College in 1886, after which she taught mathematics, physics, and chemistry at Springfield Collegiate Institute until 1889, before spending a year at Cornell University studying mathematics, history of philosophy, and physics. She returned to Massachusetts to teach mathematics for a year at the Mt. Herman School for Boys. This was followed by a year of mathematics study at Newnham College, Cambridge University, in England. Peirce returned to Smith College from 1892 to 1893 to earn her master's degree in mathematics. She again studied mathematics and history of philosophy at Cornell, then spent three years as a private student at Clark University before finally enrolling at Yale University where, in 1899, she received her Ph.D. under William Edward Story with the dissertation: Chain-Differentiants of a Ternary Quantic.

When her father died suddenly in 1908, she took over management of his substantial, multi-location retail music business (L. M. Pierce Company). During the first two decades of the 20th century, she became very involved in community activities in Springfield. In 1914, she said that her favorite hobby was "driving and automobiling." She served for eleven years on the Springfield School Board, was president of the Springfield College Club and of the Western Massachusetts Branch of the Association of Collegiate Alumnae, served for nine years as a trustee of the Wesson Memorial Hospital, and for five years as director of the Springfield Civil Service Reform League.

However, during the Great Depression that began in 1929, her music business failed, so she returned to teaching mathematics and physics at Barrington School from 1928 to 1932 and algebra and English at Leominster High School from 1932 to 1934. During the summer months from 1930 to 1932, she studied mathematics at Harvard University.

Leona Peirce had retired by 1937 and lived in Springfield until a short illness caused her death on September 24, 1954. She was survived by her only sibling, William Foster Peirce, who served as president of Kenyon College for 38 years.

== Memberships ==
- ACA (later: American Association of University Women)
- Phi Beta Kappa
