= William Metzler =

Canadian mathematician

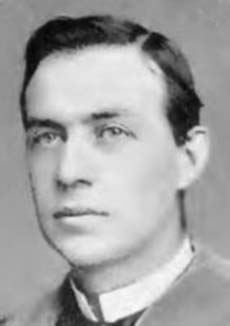

William Henry Metzler (1863–1943) was a Canadian mathematician.

== Career ==
He was born in Odessa, Canada West on 18 September 1863. He studied mathematics at the University of Toronto under Henry Taber from 1886, graduating in 1888 and then continuing as a postgraduate. He gained his doctorate in 1892. In 1895 he was appointed professor of mathematics at Syracuse University, then became dean of the graduate school. From 1923–1933, he was dean and professor of mathematics at the New York State College of Teachers in Albany, New York.

In 1902 he was elected a Fellow of the Royal Society of Edinburgh. His proposers were David Henry Marshall, Robert Wenley, John George Adami, and James Douglas Hamilton Dickson.

He died in Syracuse, New York, on 14 April 1943.

== Publications ==
- On the Roots of Matrices (1892)
- Homogenous Strains (1893)
- On the Rank of a Matrix (1913)
