= William Edward Story =

American mathematician

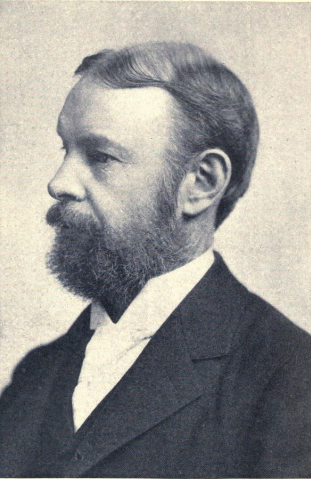
- Story in 1919
- Born: April 29, 1850; Boston, Massachusetts, U.S.
- Died: April 10, 1930 (aged 79); Worcester, Massachusetts, U.S.
- Education: Harvard University; University of Leipzig
- Scientific career
- Fields: Mathematics
- Institutions: Johns Hopkins University; Clark University
- Thesis: On the Algebraic Relations Existing Between the Polars of a Binary Quantic (1875)
- Doctoral advisor: Carl Neumann; Wilhelm Scheibner
- Doctoral students: Solomon Lefschetz; Leona May Peirce

William Edward Story (April 29, 1850 – April 10, 1930) was an American mathematician who taught at Johns Hopkins University and Clark University.

William was born in Boston to Isaac Marion Story (1818-1901) and Elizabeth Bowen Woodberry (1817-1888). He attended high school in Somerville, Massachusetts, and entered Harvard University in the fall of 1867. He graduated with honors in mathematics and began graduate study in Germany in September 1871. In Berlin he attended lectures of Weierstrass, Ernst Kummer, Helmholtz and Dove. In Leipzig he heard Karl Neumann, Bruhns, Mayer, Van der Müll, and Engelmann. He earned a Ph.D. in Leipzig in 1875 with a dissertation On the algebraic relations existing between the polars of a binary quantic.

W.E. Story began his teaching career at Harvard as a tutor. With the establishment of Johns Hopkins University in 1876, Story was recruited by Daniel Coit Gilman as an Associate. J. J. Sylvester led the program in mathematics. Until 1879, Story was the only other instructor in mathematics besides Sylvester. Story was instrumental in starting two publication projects: The Johns Hopkins University Circulars was a student paper detailing classes and attendees. American Journal of Mathematics was also started as a joint effort of Sylvester and Story, but soon Story was replaced by Thomas Craig as managing editor. In 1893, Story became an associate professor; he taught courses on quaternions, elliptic functions, invariant theory, mathematical astronomy and mathematical elasticity. Story also introduced introductory courses for graduate students, surveying the entire field. The monthly Mathematical Seminary became a weekly mathematical society, divided into three parts; Story oversaw the section on geometry and quaternions.

When Clark University was established in 1889, President G. Stanley Hall hired Oskar Bolza and Story to lead the mathematics department. Henry Taber was hired as docent, he had studied with Story at Johns Hopkins. Solomon Lefschetz and other mathematicians contributed to making Clark the leading site for mathematics in the USA until 1892 when University of Chicago eclipsed it.

Clark University ceased its graduate program in 1919 and Story retired in 1921. He died in 1930 in Worcester, Massachusetts.
