= Gillingham Borough Council elections =

Local government elections in Kent, England

Gillingham was a non-metropolitan district in Kent, England. It was abolished on 1 April 1998 and replaced by Medway. The first election took place in 1973 and the last was in 1996.

== Political control ==
The first election to the council was held in 1973, initially operating as a shadow authority alongside the outgoing authorities before coming into its powers on 1 April 1974. Political control of the council from 1974 until its abolition in 1998 was as follows:

Party in control	Years
No overall control	1974–1976
Conservative	1976–1990
No overall control	1990–1995
Liberal Democrats	1995–1998

=== Leadership ===
The leaders of the council from 1976 until its abolition in 1998 were:

Councillor	Party	From	To
Michael Lewis	Conservative	1976	May 1990
Bob Sayer	Liberal Democrats	May 1990	31 Mar 1998

== Council elections ==
- 1973 Gillingham Borough Council election
- 1976 Gillingham Borough Council election
- 1979 Gillingham Borough Council election (New ward boundaries)
- 1980 Gillingham Borough Council election
- 1982 Gillingham Borough Council election
- 1983 Gillingham Borough Council election (Borough boundary changes took place but the number of seats remained the same)
- 1984 Gillingham Borough Council election
- 1986 Gillingham Borough Council election
- 1987 Gillingham Borough Council election
- 1988 Gillingham Borough Council election
- 1990 Gillingham Borough Council election
- 1991 Gillingham Borough Council election
- 1992 Gillingham Borough Council election
- 1994 Gillingham Borough Council election
- 1995 Gillingham Borough Council election
- 1996 Gillingham Borough Council election
