= Henry Taber =

American mathematician

- Born: June 10, 1860; Staten Island, New York, US
- Died: January 6, 1936 (aged 75)
- Education: Sheffield Scientific School; Johns Hopkins University
- Spouse: Fanny Lawrence (†1892)
- Scientific career
- Fields: Mathematics
- Workplaces: Clark University
- Thesis: On Clifford's n-fold Algebras (1886)
- Doctoral advisor: William Edward Story
- Doctoral students: William Metzler; Stephen Elmer Slocum

Henry Taber (1860–1936) was an American mathematician.

== Biography ==
Taber studied mechanical engineering at Sheffield Scientific School from 1877 to 1882. Then, he went to Baltimore to study mathematics at Johns Hopkins University, under Charles Sanders Peirce and William Edward Story. He was awarded a doctorate in 1888, with a dissertation most likely tutored by Story.

The following year he was assistant professor at Johns Hopkins, but in 1889, on Clark University's foundation hiring his teacher and friend, Story, he went also to Clark. Both remained at Clark as mathematics professors until retirement in 1921.

His brother, Robert Taber, was a well known Broadway theatre actor.

Taber popularized linear algebra as expressed with matrices, in particular the symmetric matrix, skew-symmetric matrix, and orthogonal matrix.

== Works ==
The papers by Henry Taber have been listed by Bibliographica Hopkinsiensis

- 1890: On the Theory of Matrices, American Journal of Mathematics 12: 337 via HathiTrust
- 1891: "On certain Identities in the Theory of Matrices", American Journal of Mathematics 13
- 1891: "On the application to matrices of any order of the quaternion symbols S and V", Proceedings of the London Mathematical Society 22
- 1891: "On certain properties of symmetric, skew-symmetric and orthogonal matrices", Proceedings of the London Mathematical Society 22
- 1891: "On the matrical equation φ Ω = Ω φ", Proceedings of the American Academy of Arts and Sciences 18
- 1891: "On a theorem of Sylvester's relating to non-degenerate matrices", Proceedings of the American Academy of Arts and Science 19
- 1892: "Note on representation of orthogonal matrices", Proceedings of the American Academy of Arts and Science 19
- 1893: "On real orthogonal substitution", Proceedings of the American Academy of Arts and Science 20
- 1893: "On the linear transformations between two quadrics", Journal of the London Mathematical Society 24
- 1894: "On orthogonal substitutions that can be expressed as a function of a single alternate (or skew-symmetric) substitution", American Journal of Mathematics 16

The list above is not exhaustive, however. For instance, Taber had also published the following paper:

- 1896: "On the group of linear homogeneous transformations whose invariant is a bilinear form", The Mathematical Review 1(1): 154-168

== Bibliography ==
- Cooke, Roger; Rickey, V. Frederick (1989). "W. E. Story of Hopkins and Clark". In Peter Duren (ed.). A century of mathematics in America. Part 3. American Mathematical Society. pp. 29–76. ISBN 0-8218-0136-8.
- Pietarinen, Ahti-Veikko; Chevalier, Jean Marie (2014). "The Johns Hopkins Metaphysical Club and Its Impact on the Development of the Philosophy and Methodology of Sciences in the Late 19th-Century United States". Commens Working Papers (2): 1–26. ISSN 2342-4532.
