= Robert Taber (actor) =

American actor

- Taber in 1902
- Born: January 24, 1865; Staten Island, New York, U.S. (now New York City)
- Died: March 8, 1904 (aged 39); New York State, U.S.
- Occupation: Actor
- Spouse: Julia Marlowe (1894–1900)

Robert Schell Taber (January 24, 1865 – March 8, 1904) was an American Broadway actor of the late nineteenth and early twentieth centuries.

== Biography ==
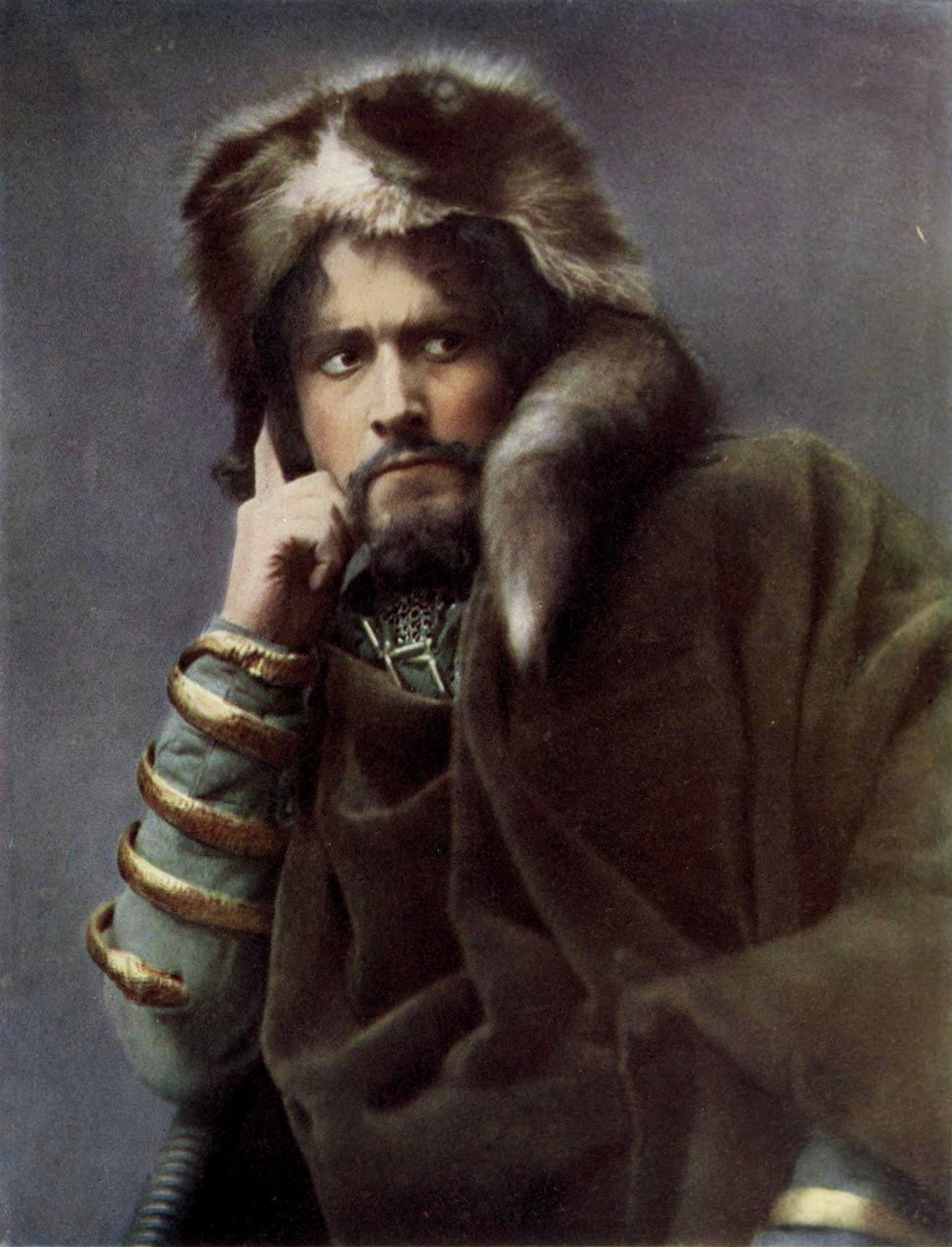
Taber as Macduff in Macbeth, c. 1900

Born in 1865 in Staten Island (before the amalgamation of New York City in 1898), where his father, Charles Corey Taber (1821–1892) was a well-known cotton merchant, his brothers were mathematician Dr. Henry S. Taber (1860–1936), a member of the American Academy of Arts and Sciences and professor of Mathematics at Clark University from 1888 to 1921, and Edward Martin Taber (1863–1896), a landscape artist. Robert Taber attended Princeton University.

His first professional engagement was in 1886 as Silvius in As You Like It with the theatrical company of Helena Modjeska. Taber later appeared with Richard Mansfield. In 1888 he joined the company of the actress Julia Marlowe and became the company's leading man.

During 1890 and 1891 he appeared in the companies of Augustin Daly and Richard Mansfield, returning to Julia Marlowe's company in late 1891, appearing with her in Twelfth Night in 1892. In 1896 he appeared as Captain Absolute in a production of Richard Brinsley Sheridan's The Rivals with his wife Julia Marlowe, Joseph Jefferson and Louisa Lane Drew at Macauley's Theatre in Louisville, Kentucky.

According to many who knew her, Marlowe sacrificed her own interests many times in order to promote Taber's career, as when he played Hotspur to her Prince Hal in Henry IV, Part 1. They married in May 1894 in Philadelphia, separated in 1899 and divorced in 1900 owing to "incompatibility of temper and professional jealousy." There were no children from the marriage.

Taber with Lena Ashwell in Bonnie Dundee at Adelphi Theatre, c. 1900

At the time of his divorce Taber was appearing in London, where, among other roles, he played Macduff in Macbeth at the Lyceum Theatre in 1898, opposite Johnston Forbes-Robertson and Mrs. Patrick Campbell. He appeared as Orsino in Sir Herbert Beerbohm Tree's production of Twelfth Night at Her Majesty's Theatre in London in 1901.

His affair in 1903 with British actress Lena Ashwell led to her divorce from her husband, Arthur Playfair.

== Death ==
Robert Taber died in 1904, aged 39, from pleurisy at a refuge in the Adirondack Mountains provided for him by Julia Marlowe. He had been made destitute by his illness.
