= Phoebe Taber =

American painter

- Born: Phoebe Merritt; 1834; Millbrook, New York
- Died: March 22, 1916 (aged 82); Pasadena, California
- Known for: Painting

Phoebe Thorn Merritt Clements Taber (1834 – March 22, 1916) was a painter believed to have been the "first professional female artist in Detroit."

== Background ==
In 1834, Phoebe Taber was in Millbrook, New York to Daniel and Mary Merritt. She was the third of six children. In 1857, at the age of twenty-three, she married Clark P. Clements of Ionia, Michigan. Following his death 1861, after just four years of marriage, Taber sought to become an artist to independently support herself and her son Clark.

She was admitted to the "Female School of Art" at Cooper Union in 1865, and continued her studies at the Académie Julian in Paris. At the Académie Julian she specifically studied with William-Adolfe Bouguereau. After her studies, she returned to Michigan, remarried at the age of 39, and changed her name from Phoebe T. Clements to Phoebe T. Clements Taber. She continued to work as an artist even after marriage.

Between 1880 and 1886, Taber lived in Ionia, where her husband had an agricultural store. In 1886, her family moved to Grand Rapids. Despite not living in the city, Taber continued to have an artistic presence in Detroit until 1898. All told she spent 40 years in Michigan. In the 1890s, Taber and her husband moved to Pasadena, California. Taber died in Pasadena on March 22, 1916, at the age of 82.

== Artwork ==
Taber specialized in fruit and flower still-life paintings. She has also more recently been recognized additionally as "versatile in figures and portraits."

Her portrait of Peter Cooper, the founder of the Cooper Union, was accepted into the Art Loan Exhibition of 1883, Detroit's first international art show.

In 1893, seven of Taber's paintings were displayed at the Chicago World's Fair.

=== Selected exhibitions ===
- Paris Salon, 1891 and 1892 (group)
- Hanna & Noyes, Detroit, 1892 (solo)
- Russell House, Detroit, 1892 (solo)
- Detroit Art Loan, 1883 and 1889 (group)
- Chicago World's Fair, 1893 (group)
