= R. N. Taber =

English poet and novelist

Roger Noel Taber (born December 1945) is an English poet and novelist.

Raised in Kent, he graduated from the University of Kent during 1973. He is a librarian by profession, and currently lives in London. He has written for various poetry magazines and anthologies across England and America. Openly gay, he writes psycho-sociological poetry about both the homosexual and heterosexual communities, often experimenting with voices. Although he usually employs a first person narrative, Taber's works are a blend of observation, role play and personal experiences. A popular quote often published in his poetry collections is: 'Colour, creed, sex, sexuality... These are but part of a whole'.

Aside from poetry he has also written several novels, two of which have been published.

On Tuesday 14 July 2009 Roger N. Taber participated in UK sculptor Antony Gormley's 'One And Other' live arts project (Week 2) as one of 2,400 people selected at random to capture a moment in time on the 4th plinth in London's Trafalgar Square. This significant archival project – designed to run continuously 24/7 for 100 days – expresses not only the diversity of the UK population but also the human psyche. Taber read a selection of his own poetry, including poems on gay and transgender themes among others intended to represent his perspective on contemporary society.

== Bibliography ==
Poetry

- Taber, R. N. (1996), August and Genet: (observations and reminiscences of a gay man), Aramby, ISBN 978-1-900462-55-6
- Taber, R. N. (2001), Love and human remains: poems, Roger N. Taber, ISBN 978-0-9539833-0-8
- Taber, R. N. (2002), First Person Plural, Roger N. Taber, ISBN 978-0-9539833-1-5
- Taber, R. N. (2004), The third eye, Roger N. Taber, ISBN 978-0-9539833-2-2
- Taber, R. N. (2005), A Feeling for the Quickness of Time, Roger N. Taber, ISBN 978-0-9539833-3-9
- Taber, R. N. (2007), Accomplices to Illusion, Assembly Books, ISBN 978-0-9539833-4-6
- Taber, R. N. (2010), On The Battlefields of Love, Roger N. Taber, ISBN 978-0-9539833-6-0
- Taber, R. N. (2012), Tracking the Torchbearer, Assembly Books; First edition (26 March 2012), ISBN 978-0-9539833-7-7

Novels

- Blasphemy (2006) ISBN 978-1-879194-61-8
- Sacrilege (2008) ISBN 978-0-9539833-5-3
- Catching Up With Murder (2011) ISBN 978-1-61667-188-4
