= Grade I listed buildings in Medway =

There are over 9,000 Grade I listed buildings in England. This page is a list of these buildings in the district of Medway in Kent.

== Medway ==
Name	Location	Type	Completed (Note: The date given is the date used by Historic England as significant for the initial building or that of an important part in the structure's description.)	Date designated	Grid ref. (Note: The grid reference is based on the British national grid reference system, sometimes known as OSGB36, used by the Ordnance Survey.) Geo-coordinates	Entry number (Note: The "List Entry Number" is a unique number assigned to each listed building and scheduled monument by Historic England.)	Image
Church of All Saints	Allhallows, Medway	Parish Church	12th century	21 November 1966	TQ8359777547; 51°28′02″N 0°38′31″E	1085758	Church of All Saints More images
Church of St Helen	Cliffe and Cliffe Woods, Medway	Collegiate Church	c. 1200	21 November 1966	TQ7359476626; 51°27′43″N 0°29′51″E	1204042	Church of St Helen More images
Church of St James	Cooling, Medway	Parish Church	C13-C15	21 November 1966	TQ7562475949; 51°27′19″N 0°31′35″E	1204117	Church of St James More images
Cooling Castle Gatehouse	Cooling, Medway	Castle	1381-85	21 November 1966	TQ7538775892; 51°27′17″N 0°31′23″E	1085770	Cooling Castle Gatehouse More images
Inner Ward to Cooling Castle	Cooling, Medway	Castle	seat after 1214	21 November 1966	TQ7536875942; 51°27′19″N 0°31′22″E	1085771	Inner Ward to Cooling Castle More images
Church of St Michael	Cuxton, Medway	Parish Church	12th century	21 November 1966	TQ7095966451; 51°22′17″N 0°27′17″E	1085774	Church of St Michael More images
Barn 30 Yards South West of the Manor House	Frindsbury Extra, Medway	Aisled Barn	c. 1300	27 August 1952	TQ7469470041; 51°24′09″N 0°30′36″E	1204320	Barn 30 Yards South West of the Manor House More images
The Barracks	Upnor, Frindsbury Extra, Medway	Barracks	1717-18	14 November 1986	TQ7581070502; 51°24′23″N 0°31′35″E	1085742	The Barracks More images
Upnor Castle	Upper Upnor, Frindsbury Extra, Medway	Moat	1599-1601	14 November 1986	TQ7585670574; 51°24′25″N 0°31′37″E	1204365	Upnor Castle More images
Church of St John the Baptist	Halling, Medway	Parish Church	12th century	21 November 1966	TQ7052163886; 51°20′54″N 0°26′50″E	1085746	Church of St John the Baptist More images
Church of St Margaret	High Halstow, Medway	Parish Church	13th century	21 January 1966	TQ7797675278; 51°26′55″N 0°33′36″E	1204435	Church of St Margaret More images
Church of St Werburgh	Hoo St. Werburgh, Medway	Parish Church	C12-C15	21 November 1966	TQ7834671856; 51°25′04″N 0°33′48″E	1204440	Church of St Werburgh More images
Church of St James	Isle of Grain, Medway	Parish Church	12th century	21 November 1966	TQ8887476789; 51°27′31″N 0°43′02″E	1085755	Church of St James More images
Church of St Peter and St Paul	Stoke, Medway	Parish Church	12th century	21 November 1966	TQ8234275073; 51°26′43″N 0°37′21″E	1204545	Church of St Peter and St Paul More images
Cathedral Church of Christ and the Blessed Virgin Mary of Rochester	Rochester, Medway	Cathedral	C7	24 October 1950	TQ7427368521; 51°23′20″N 0°30′12″E	1086423	Cathedral Church of Christ and the Blessed Virgin Mary of Rochester More images
Cathedral Cloister Buildings	Rochester, Medway	Wall	Roman	24 October 1950	TQ7425768489; 51°23′19″N 0°30′11″E	1086461	Cathedral Cloister Buildings More images
Chertsey's Gate	Rochester, Medway	Gate	Probably mid 14th century	24 October 1950	TQ7429368603; 51°23′23″N 0°30′13″E	1086494	Chertsey's Gate More images
Church of St Margaret	Rainham, Medway	Church	c. 1066	24 February 1950	TQ8173665881; 51°21′47″N 0°36′33″E	1267793	Church of St Margaret More images
Cloister Gate	Rochester, Medway	Gate	12th century	2 December 1991	TQ7423968480; 51°23′19″N 0°30′10″E	1320354	Cloister Gate More images
Deanery Gate and Gatehouse	Rochester, Medway	House	Mid-late 18th century	24 October 1950	TQ7429268544; 51°23′21″N 0°30′13″E	1115637	Deanery Gate and Gatehouse More images
Dickens Chalet to Rear of Eastgate House	Eastgate, Rochester, Medway	Chalet	19th century	24 October 1950	TQ7448068345; 51°23′14″N 0°30′22″E	1116244	Dickens Chalet to Rear of Eastgate House More images
Eastgate House	Eastgate, Rochester, Medway	Jettied House	1590-1	24 October 1950	TQ7447368342; 51°23′14″N 0°30′22″E	1086482	Eastgate House More images
Former Commissioners House and attached Staff Accommodation	Chatham Dockyard, Medway	Naval Officers House	1703	24 May 1971	TQ7587669080; 51°23′37″N 0°31′36″E	1268201	Former Commissioners House and attached Staff Accommodation More images
Former Lead and Paint Mill	Chatham Dockyard, Medway	Paint Factory	1817-1819	13 August 1999	TQ7582368757; 51°23′26″N 0°31′32″E	1378588	Former Lead and Paint Mill More images
Former Mast House and Mould Loft	Chatham Dockyard, Medway	Mast House	1753-1755	13 August 1999	TQ7602569434; 51°23′48″N 0°31′44″E	1378590	Former Mast House and Mould Loft More images
Former Officers Terrace and Attached Front Area Walls and Overthrows	Chatham Dockyard, Medway	Naval Officers House	1722-1731	24 May 1971	TQ7598269154; 51°23′39″N 0°31′41″E	1268220	Former Officers Terrace and Attached Front Area Walls and Overthrows More images
Former Storehouse Number 2 and Former Rigging Store	Chatham Dockyard, Medway	Rigging House	1793-1796	13 August 1999	TQ7578368951; 51°23′33″N 0°31′31″E	1378585	Upload Photo
Former Storehouse Number 3 and Former Chain Cable Store	Chatham Dockyard, Medway	Warehouse	1773-1783	13 August 1999	TQ7574268765; 51°23′27″N 0°31′28″E	1378584	Former Storehouse Number 3 and Former Chain Cable Store More images
Kings School and Cathedral Visitors Centre	Medway	Deanery	Late Medieval	24 October 1950	TQ7431168461; 51°23′18″N 0°30′14″E	1086421	Upload Photo
Main Gate and attached Dockyard Perimeter Wall to South West	Chatham Dockyard, Medway	Boundary Wall	1718	24 May 1971	TQ7588168888; 51°23′30″N 0°31′36″E	1268202	Main Gate and attached Dockyard Perimeter Wall to South West More images
Minor Canons' Row	Medway	Clergy House	1736	24 October 1950	TQ7423568444; 51°23′18″N 0°30′10″E	1139023	Minor Canons' Row More images
Number 3 Slip Cover	Chatham Dockyard, Medway	Slip Shed	1838	13 August 1999	TQ7590369410; 51°23′47″N 0°31′38″E	1378591	Number 3 Slip Cover More images
Number 7 Slip Cover and Machine Shop Number 3	Chatham Dockyard, Medway	Slip Shed	1852-1855	13 August 1999	TQ7599369576; 51°23′53″N 0°31′43″E	1378595	Number 7 Slip Cover and Machine Shop Number 3 More images
Numbers 4 5 and 6 Slip Covers and Machine Shop Number 6	Chatham Dockyard, Medway	Slip Shed	1845-1847	13 August 1999	TQ7595169499; 51°23′50″N 0°31′40″E	1378594	Numbers 4 5 and 6 Slip Covers and Machine Shop Number 6 More images
Chatham Naval Memorial	Chatham, Kent	War memorial	1924	5 December 1996	TQ7618668049; 51°23′01″N 0°31′56″E	1267787	Chatham Naval Memorial More images
Parish Church of St Nicholas	Rochester, Medway	Parish Church	1421-23	24 October 1950	TQ7428268570; 51°23′22″N 0°30′12″E	1299749	Parish Church of St Nicholas More images
Poor Travellers House / Richard Watts Charity	Medway	House	1950	24 October 1950	TQ7437668495; 51°23′19″N 0°30′17″E	1086479	Poor Travellers House / Richard Watts Charity More images
Priors Gate	Rochester, Medway	Gate	1344	24 October 1950	TQ7420468450; 51°23′18″N 0°30′08″E	1086428	Priors Gate More images
Public Library (former Corn Exchange) to Rear of High Street, the Corn Exchange the Corn Exchange	Rochester, Medway	Corn Exchange	1706	23 August 1974	TQ7432168655; 51°23′25″N 0°30′15″E	1086474	Public Library (former Corn Exchange) to Rear of High Street, the Corn Exchange the Corn Exchange More images
Restoration House including Wall and Gatepiers attached to Front	Medway	Cross Passage House	Late Medieval	24 October 1950	TQ7436368213; 51°23′10″N 0°30′16″E	1185341	Restoration House including Wall and Gatepiers attached to Front More images
Rochester Castle	Rochester, Medway	Castle	1087-89	24 October 1950	TQ7413768560; 51°23′22″N 0°30′05″E	1336100	Rochester Castle More images
Rochester City Walls	Rochester, Medway	Bastion	Mid 14th century	24 October 1950	TQ7437268345; 51°23′14″N 0°30′17″E	1086506	Rochester City Walls More images
Sail Loft	Chatham Dockyard, Medway	Sail Loft	c. 1723	13 August 1999	TQ7595169034; 51°23′35″N 0°31′40″E	1378586	Sail Loft More images
Section of Roman Wall 20 Metres South of Former Deanery Section of Roman Wall 20 Metres South of Kings School Sixth Form Centre	Medway	Wall	Roman	19 February 1970	TQ7430468430; 51°23′17″N 0°30′13″E	1336174	Upload Photo
Temple Manor	Strood, Medway	Farmhouse	second and third quarter 17th century	24 October 1950	TQ7331368535; 51°23′22″N 0°29′22″E	1120910	Temple Manor More images
The Brunel Saw Mill	Chatham Dockyard, Medway	Fireproof Building	1810-1814	24 May 1971	TQ7617269302; 51°23′43″N 0°31′51″E	1268231	The Brunel Saw Mill More images
The Guildhall including Ranges Running Parallel to Bull Lane	Rochester, Medway	Local Government Office	1864-66	24 October 1950	TQ7424068741; 51°23′27″N 0°30′11″E	1186145	The Guildhall including Ranges Running Parallel to Bull Lane More images
The Ropery and Spinning Room	Chatham Dockyard, Medway	Ropery	1785-1791	24 May 1971	TQ7578768842; 51°23′29″N 0°31′31″E	1268250	The Ropery and Spinning Room More images
150, 152 and 154 High Street	Eastgate, Rochester, Medway	Apartment	1950	24 October 1950	TQ7447968299; 51°23′13″N 0°30′22″E	1086499	150, 152 and 154 High Street More images
