= William Coles Finch =

British historian (1964–1944)

- Born: 23 October 1864; Rochester, Kent, England
- Died: 6 June 1944 (aged 79); Luton, Kent
- Burial place: St Nicholas Church, Rochester
- Other name: William Coles-Finch
- Occupation: Waterworks manager
- Known for: Writing a number of books on Kent
- Spouse: Emily Sarah (née Hall)
- Children: Vera; Dorothy; Irene; Neville

Signature
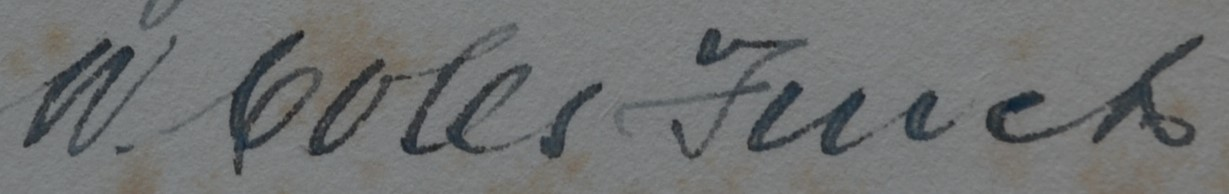

William Coles Finch MICE (23 October 1864 – 6 June 1944) was a British historian and author of a number of books on Kent-related topics. He is best known for writing Watermills and Windmills, published in 1933 and reprinted in 1976, which is considered a standard work on the topic of Kent windmills.

== Personal ==
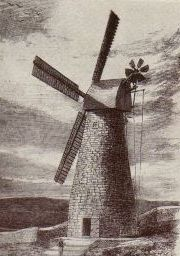
Jaffa Gate Mill, Jerusalem. Picture originally published in Illustrated London News in 1858 and republished in "Watermills and Windmills" by William Coles Finch, first published in 1933.

William Coles Finch was born on 23 October 1864 in Rochester, Kent. His wife was Emily, and they had four children, Vera, Dorothy, Irene and Neville. In 1908, his first book, Water, its origin and use, was published. This was followed in 1914 by Water in Nature, jointly authored with Ellison Hawks. In 1925, In Kentish Pilgrim Land was published, followed by The Lure of the Countryside in 1927, Life in Rural England in 1928 and Watermills in Windmills in 1933. The latter is considered a bible on windmills in Kent. Coles Finch died in Luton, Kent on 6 June 1944, aged 79. He is buried in the churchyard of St Nicholas Church, Rochester. In 1976, Watermills and Windmills was reprinted. BBC Radio Medway produced an hour-long documentary Sweeping Changes, The Windmills of Kent in response to the reprint.

== Career ==
Coles Finch was the resident engineer of the Brompton, Chatham, Gillingham and Rochester Water Company. He had previously been engineer and manager of the Higham and Hundred of Hoo Water Company and assistant manager of Strood Waterworks. He lived at Waterworks House, Luton, Chatham. In 1897, Coles Finch read a paper at the British Association of Waterworks Engineers meeting at the Town Hall, Westminster, London on Electrical Water Level Recorders.

== Published works ==
- Water, its origin and use. London: Alston Rivers, Ltd. 1908.
- Water in Nature. Edinburgh: T. C. and E. C. Jack Ltd. 1914. (jointly authored with Ellison Hawks).
- The Foords of Rochester : Reminiscences. Rochester: Parrett & Neves. 1917.
- In Kentish Pilgrimland, its Ancient Roads and Shrines. London: C W Daniel. 1927.
- The Lure of the Countryside. London: C W Daniel. 1927.
  - The Lure of the Countryside. Milton Keynes: Lightning Source UK. 2009. ISBN 978-1-44465-090-7. (reprint)
- Life in Rural England. London: C W Daniel. 1928.
- The Medway River & Valley. London: C W Daniel. 1929.
- Watermills and Windmills. London: C W Daniel. 1933.
  - Watermills and Windmills. Sheerness: A J Cassell. 1976. ISBN 0-903253-02-X. (reprint)

== Sources ==
- Cumming, Rob (2010). "Bromley's Windmill:Debunking a few myths". Cant Post (2). Kent: Kent Mills Society.
- Coles-Finch, William (1908). Water, its origin and use. London: C W Daniel.
- Coles Finch, William (1933). Watermills and Windmills. London: C W Daniel.
- Nicholas, Nick (1993). "William Coles-Finch". Newsletter 55. Ipswich: Suffolk Mills Group.
