= Annals of Rochester (disambiguation) =

Annals of Rochester usually refers to the Textus Roffensis.

Annals of Rochester or Rochester Chronicle may also refer:

- Historia Roffensis (Parker MS 342), covering the years 179–1377, attributed to John of Rainham
- Ecclesiastical History (Cott. Nero D 2), by Edmund of Hadenham, covering the years 804–1307
- Historia Roffensis (Cott. Faust. B 5), by William of Dene, covering the years 1314–135
