= Corn Exchange, Rochester =

Commercial building in Rochester, England

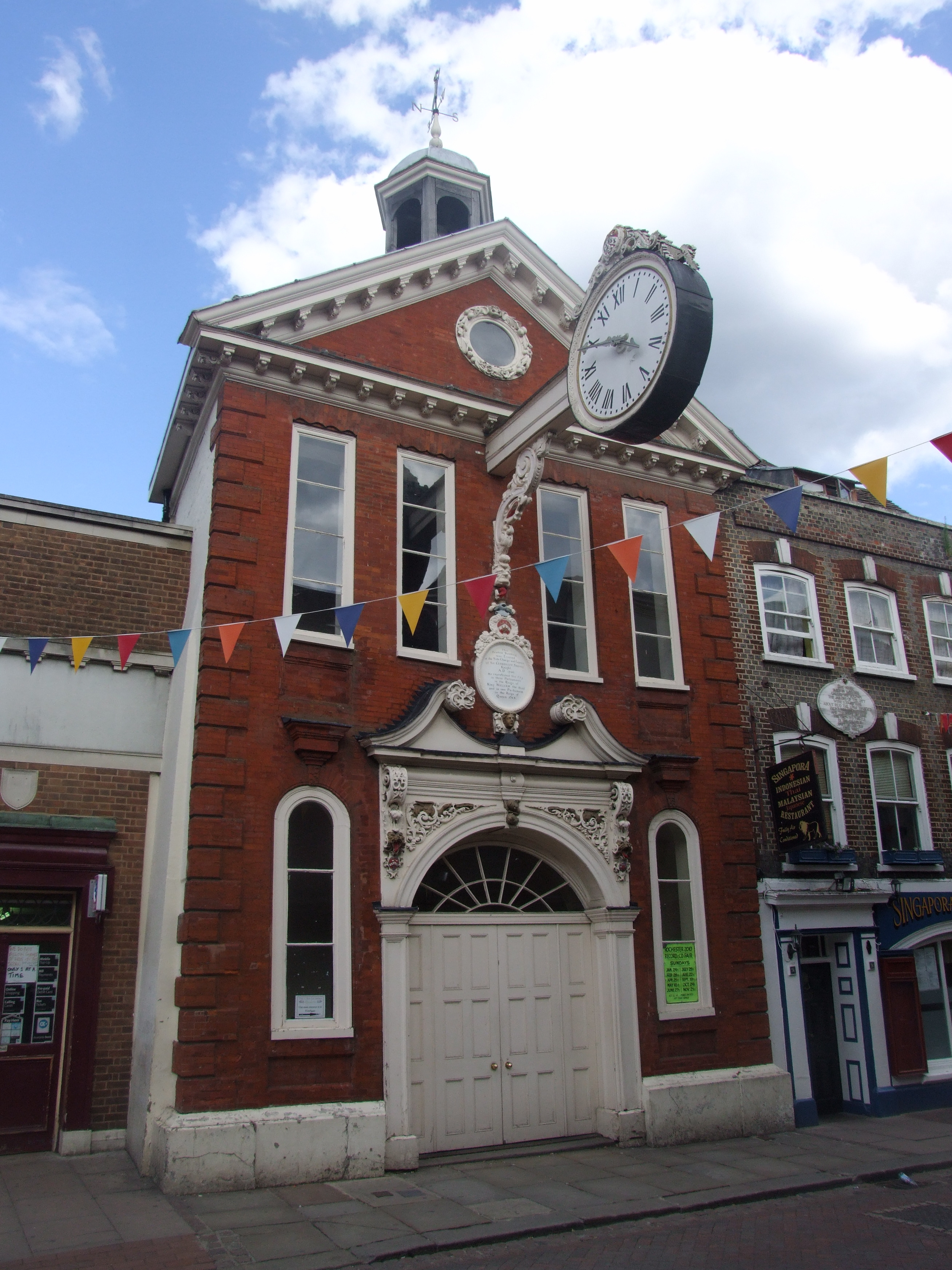
- Corn Exchange, Rochester

- Shown in Kent
- 51.3901°N 0.5038°E
- Location: High Street, Rochester

History
- Built: 1706

Site notes
- Architectural style: Neoclassical style

Listed Building – Grade I
- Official name: Public Library (Former Corn Exchange) to rear of High Street, The Corn Exchange
- Designated: 23 August 1974
- Reference no.: 1086474

The Corn Exchange is a commercial complex in the High Street, Rochester, Kent, England. The complex, which was commissioned as a corn exchange and is now used as an events venue, is a Grade I listed building.

== History ==
The corn exchange was commissioned by Admiral Sir Cloudesley Shovell, who was the Member of Parliament for the City of Rochester in the early 18th century. It was designed in the neoclassical style, built in red brick with rusticated quoins and was completed in 1706. The design involved a symmetrical main frontage of three bays facing onto the High Street. The central bay featured a doorway with a fanlight, flanked by Doric order pilasters supporting a moulded arch with carvings in the spandrels, a frieze and a swan-necked pediment. The outer bays were fenestrated by narrow round headed windows while the first floor was fenestrated by four tall square headed windows. At roof level, there was a modillioned pediment, containing an oculus in the tympanum, a cupola containing a bell, and a weather vane.

The original square-shaped projecting clock, also gifted by Shovell, was replaced by the current circular clock in 1771. The author, Charles Dickens, was very impressed by the clock and described it as the "finest clock in the world".

The original structure was never much more than a façade and it was massively extended, in the 1860s, by the construction of a new rectangular building on a site to the immediate north of the existing structure and at a right angle to it, facing onto Northgate: the new structure was designed by Flockton and Abbott, built in buff brick and completed in 1870. It was fenestrated by three tall square headed windows with architraves and keystones on the first floor and by three Diocletian windows with architraves and keystones on the second floor. Internally, the principal room was the main hall on the first floor: it featured Corinthian order columns, ornate plasterwork and elaborate chandeliers. The ground floor was fitted out as a public library and opened in that use in June 1888.

The use of the complex as a corn exchange declined significantly in the wake of the Great Depression of British Agriculture in the late 19th century. Instead, the it became an events and concert venue and, in October 1964, performers included the band, The Who. After the public library moved from the ground floor of the complex to new premises alongside the Adult Education Centre in Eastgate in 2006, the Medway Register Office relocated from Maistone Road in Chatham to the ground floor of the corn exchange. The projecting clock was restored at a cost of £40,000 in spring 2017.

== See also ==
- Corn exchanges in England
- Grade I listed buildings in Medway
