= St Nicholas Church, Rochester =

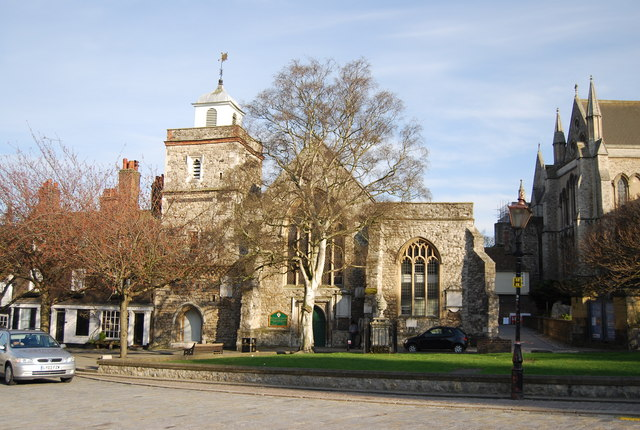
- St Nicholas seen from the northwest

- Location within Kent
- 51°23′22″N 0°30′12″E
- OS grid reference: TQ 74282 68570
- Location: Rochester, Kent
- Country: England
- Denomination: Church of England

History
- Dedication: St Nicholas
- Consecrated: 18 December 1423; 24 September 1624

Architecture
- Functional status: Diocesan office
- Heritage designation: Grade I
- Designated: 24 October 1950
- Years built: 1421–23; 1620–24

Specifications
- Length: 100 feet (30 m)
- Width: 60 feet (18 m)
- Materials: Kentish rag rubble, clay tile roof

Administration
- Province: Canterbury
- Diocese: Rochester

St Nicholas Church is a former parish church in Rochester, Kent, England, next to Rochester Cathedral. It is now the offices of the Board of Education of the Anglican Diocese of Rochester. It is a Grade I listed building.

== 1420s church ==
Since before the Norman conquest of England in the 11th century, Rochester had a parish of St Nicholas that worshipped at its own altar in Rochester Cathedral. But early in the 15th century there was a dispute between parishioners and the Bishop of Rochester. Henry Chichele, Archbishop of Canterbury, intervened and in 1421 the parishioners of St Nicholas were instructed to move out of the cathedral to a church of their own.

The church of St Nicholas was duly built just north of the cathedral, in the north corner of the lay cemetery. It was completed in 1423 and consecrated on 18 December.

== 1620s rebuilt church ==
By 1620 the church was poor condition. It was partly demolished, rebuilt, and on 24 September 1624 John Buckeridge, Bishop of Rochester, reconsecrated it. The rebuilt church was completed with Geometric Decorated Gothic tracery windows: an example of 17th-century English Gothic Survival architecture.

The church was restored between 1860 and 1862, when the windows were replaced with Gothic Revival ones, again replicating a Decorated Gothic style.

In 1963–64 Diocesan offices were inserted in the west end and aisles, which were partitioned off for the purpose. In 1971 the 17th-century pulpit was removed. In 1973 the pews followed it, being replaced with chairs. In 1973–74 the Diocese made major repairs to the stonework at a cost of £21,000.

St Nicholas is now the headquarters of the Diocesan Board of Education.

== Description ==
The church has a north tower (ritually at the northwest corner). It has three stages, and a door on the northwest side. The belfry has a 17th-century frame for hanging three bells. Two bells were owned in 1624 though none currently remain in the church's possession.

The church has a five-light west window framed by buttresses, with a doorway below; three-light windows in the south aisle, with buttresses between; and a five-light south window. The tower, and the door below the northwest window, are thought to be 15th-century.

Inside are five-bay arcades on 17th-century Tuscan columns. Tuscan half-columns support the chancel arch.

== Notable burials ==
Author William Coles Finch is buried in the churchyard.

== See also ==
- Grade I listed buildings in Medway

== Bibliography ==
- Hasted, Edward (1798). "The city and liberty of Rochester: The city parishes". The History and Topographical Survey of the County of Kent. Vol. IV. Canterbury: W Bristow. pp. 153–182.
- Newman, John (1976) [1969]. West Kent and the Weald. The Buildings of England. Harmondsworth: Penguin Books. p. 489. ISBN 0-14-071038-8.
- Palmer, G. H. (1897). The Cathedral Church of Rochester – A description of its fabric and a brief history of the Episcopal See. Bell's Cathedrals. London: George Bell & Sons. via Project Gutenberg
