= Peter Buck (mayor) =

English mayor & naval official (??–1625)

Sir Peter Buck (died 1625) was an English mayor and naval official.

== Career ==
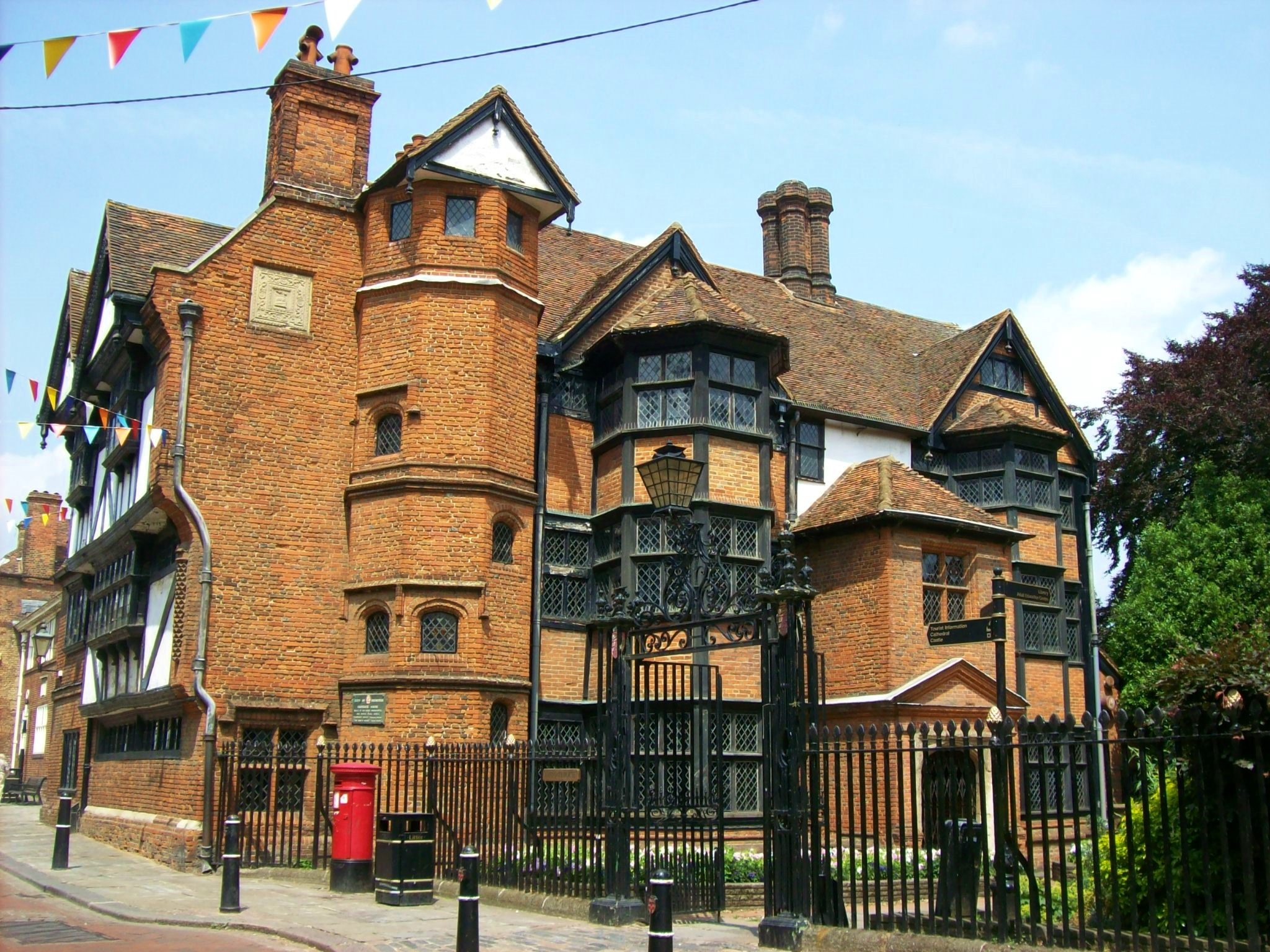
Eastgate House Rochester

In the 1590s, Buck was Mayor of Rochester and Clerk of the Cheque at Chatham Dockyard. Eastgate House, a Grade I listed Elizabethan townhouse in Rochester, Kent, was built for him.

From 1596, he held the post of Clerk of the Navy (also known as Clerk of the ships) and was knighted by James I in 1603. He also served as Secretary to Algernon Percy, Earl of Northumberland and Lord High Admiral.

== Death ==
He died in 1625 and was survived by his wife Frances, the only daughter of William Knight, and daughter Margaret. He was referred to as "The Worshipful Sir Peter".

== See also ==
- William Barlow (bishop of Lincoln)
- William Borough
