= Rochester Guildhall =

Municipal building in Rochester, Kent, England

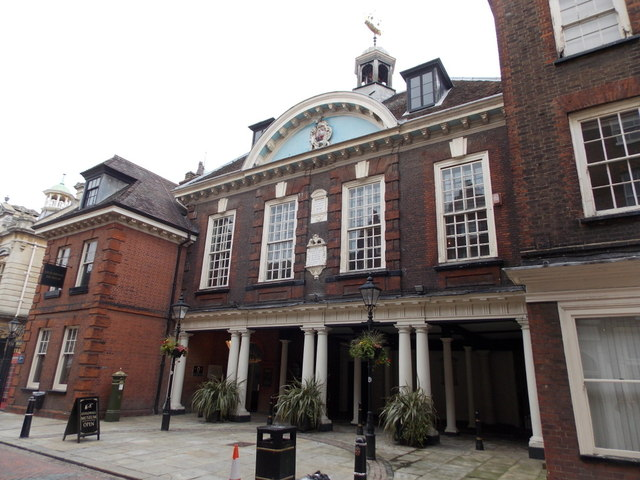
- The Guildhall

- Location within Kent
- 51.3909°N 0.5028°E
- Location: High Street, Rochester
- OS grid reference: TQ4849781080

History
- Built: 1697

Site notes
- Owner: Medway Council

Listed Building – Grade I
- Designated: 24 October 1950
- Reference no.: 1186145

The Rochester Guildhall is an historic building located in the High Street in Rochester, Kent, England. It is a Grade I listed building.

== History ==
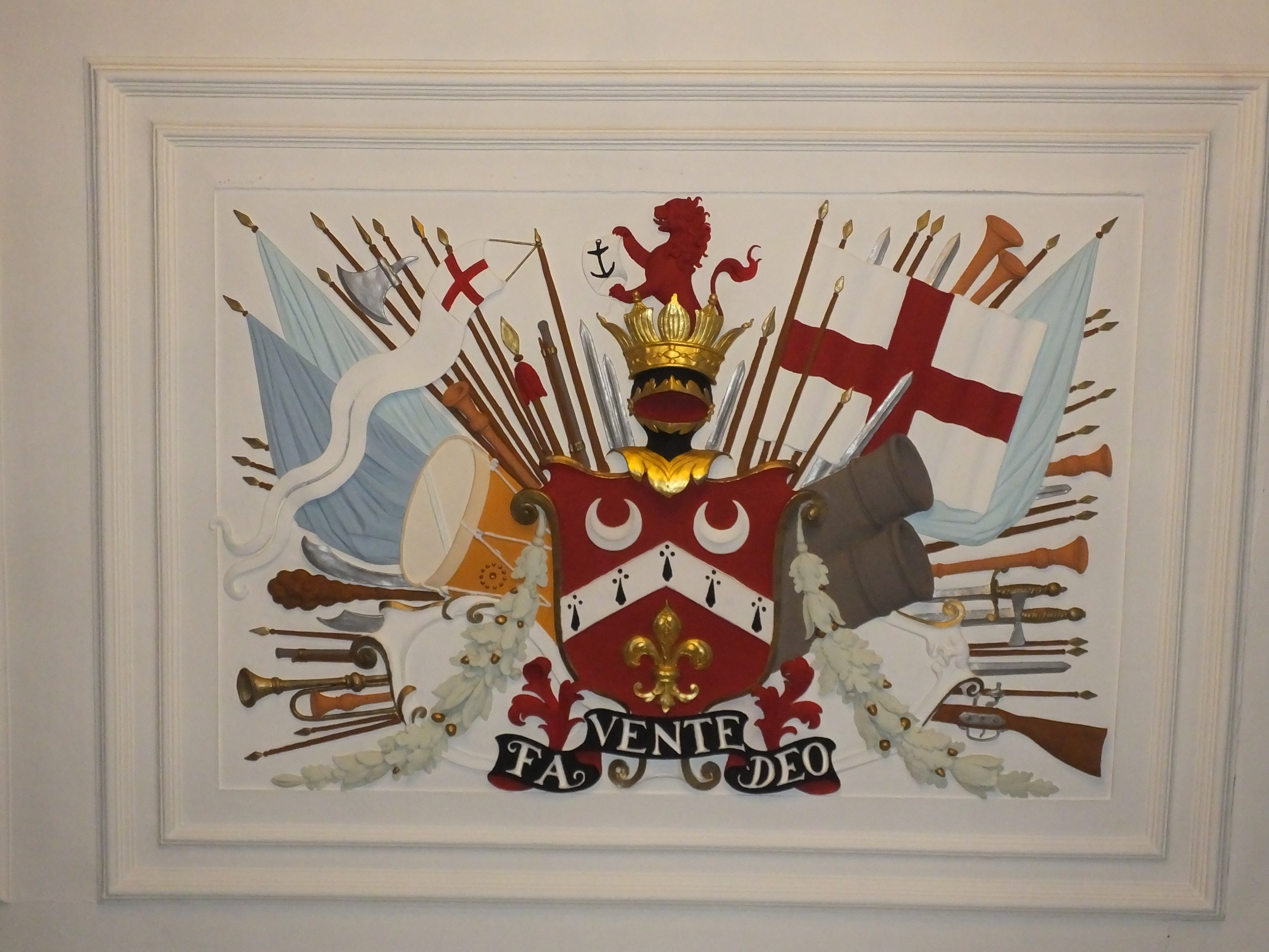
A panel in the ceiling given by Sir Cloudesley Shovell

The first guildhall in Rochester was located further south along the High Street on a site where the Clock House is now situated.

The current building, the second guildhall, was constructed in 1697. The design for the main frontage involved four bays: the ground floor was left open, apart from some paired Tuscan order columns, to allow markets to be held; the first floor was designed with four windows with white plaques in the middle commemorating the completion of the building in 1697 and also the financial contribution made by Sir Stafford Fairborne. At roof level a large round-headed pediment was erected above which was a bell-turret was placed. A weather vane in the form of an 18th-century warship was added in 1780. Wings were added on the right in 1838 and on the left in 1893.

Internally, the principal room was the courtroom which, in time, was also used as a council chamber. The magistrates' bench was curved so that attention was focussed on all the members of the bench and not just the chief magistrate. Both the council chamber and the staircase have magnificent plaster ceilings, which were given in 1695 by Admiral Sir Cloudesley Shovell, who was the Member of Parliament for the City of Rochester at the time. The council chamber featured in the novel Great Expectations by Charles Dickens published in 1861. In the 1930s, in anticipation of the Second World War, a civil defence headquarters was established in the basement of the building.

For much of the 20th century, the council chamber was the meeting place of the City of Rochester but ceased to be the local seat of government when the enlarged Borough of Medway was formed in 1974. The guildhall became the home of the Guildhall Museum in 1979.

== The Guildhall Museum ==
The museum was originally established at Eastgate House, further south along the High Street, to commemorate Queen Victoria's Diamond Jubilee in 1897. The collection includes artefacts associated with Rochester from prehistoric times to the present day. Works of art in the museum include a painting by Hendrik Frans van Lint depicting a classical Italian landscape, a portrait of Sir Cloudesley Shovell by Michael Dahl and a portrait of Sir Stafford Fairborne by Godfrey Kneller.

== See also ==
- Grade I listed buildings in Medway
- Guild
- Guildhall
