= Ellison Hawks =

English science writer and popularizer

Ellison Hawks (13 March 1889 – 5 April 1971) was a British writer on popular science and technology topics. He wrote numerous books explaining the working of gadgets and the manufacture of industrial products. From 1921 he became an editor of Meccano Magazine while also serving as the advertising manager for Meccano, the producer of do-it-yourself science and engineering kits.

== Life and work ==
Hawks was born in Hull to Rowena Reynard (Hull) and Matthew Hawks. In 1901 his family lived in Lower Bebington, Cheshire and he was educated at Bebington College, followed by studies at Rock Ferry, Wirral and Manchester. He became a clerk at the Commercial Union in Leeds in 1914. He took an interest in motorcycles, racing and also joined the Leeds Astronomical Society in 1908, becoming its secretary in 1911. He edited the magazine of the Astronomical Society and began to give talks on popular science, publishing his first book in 1910. He became a Fellow of the Royal Astronomical Society.

He co-authored Water in Nature with William Coles Finch in 1914. In World War I he worked as a motorcycle despatch-rider with the Royal Navy and was later commissioned in the 49 Territorial Division of the Royal Field Artillery. He rose to the position of captain, joined the artillery and saw action in the Battle of the Somme where he fell to gas warfare. He later worked as assistant provost marshal in the Northern Command.

After the war, he pursued a career in writing and joined Meccano run by Frank Hornby, becoming its advertising manager in 1921. Hawks worked as a general editor of Amalgamated Press from 1936 to 1940. He published a wide range of books and articles in periodicals. Hawks was the author of a book on the Austin A40 Somerset published in 1955.

He married Edna Fawcett and they had a son and two daughters.
