= St James' Church, Cooling =

Coordinates: 51.4553°N 0.5264°E

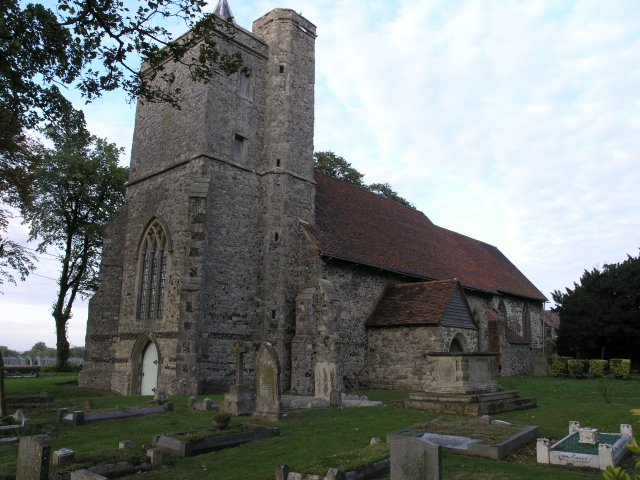
- St James' Church, Cooling, from the southwest

- Location in Kent
- OS grid reference: TQ 756 759
- Location: Cooling, Kent
- Country: England
- Denomination: Anglican
- Website: Churches Conservation Trust

History
- Dedication: Saint James

Architecture
- Functional status: Redundant
- Heritage designation: Grade I
- Designated: 21 November 1966
- Architectural type: Church
- Style: Gothic

Specifications
- Materials: Ragstone, flint, chalk, and sandstone Roofs tiled

St James' Church is a redundant Anglican church in the village of Cooling, Kent, England. It is recorded in the National Heritage List for England as a designated Grade I listed building, and is under the care of the Churches Conservation Trust. The church stands in the Hoo peninsula, 6 miles (10 km) north of Rochester, with only marshland to the north between it and the River Thames.

== History ==
The church originates from the 13th century, with its building continuing into the following century. The upper part of the tower was added later, and was completed by about 1400. The church was restored in the 19th century, when a vestry was added, and the porch was rebuilt. It was declared redundant on 19 November 1976 and vested in the Churches Conservation Trust on 31 May 1978. It is now cared for by a group known as the Friends of St James' Church. The church is open daily to visitors.

The churchyard provided the inspiration for the opening chapter of Charles Dickens' book Great Expectations, in which the hero of the story, Pip, meets the convict, Magwitch. In 2005 the musician Jools Holland married the sculptor Christabel McEwan in the church.

== Architecture ==
St James' is constructed in a variety of stone, including ragstone, flint and chalk, with some repairs in sandstone. The roofs are tiled. Its plan consists of a nave with a south porch, a chancel with a south vestry, and a west tower. The windows in the nave date from the early 14th century, and those in the chancel from the 15th century.

The north doorway is blocked, but its 500-year-old timber door is still present, and still swings on its hinges. In the chancel are a triple sedilia and a double piscina. The font dates from the 13th century, and consists of a square bowl supported by five piers. The pulpit dates from the 18th century. At the west end of the church are six benches that probably date from the 14th century; the others were replaced in 1869. There are four memorial slabs in the floor of the nave. One of these is dated 1611. Another is to the memory of Feyth Brook, who died in 1508. She was the wife of Thomas Brook, Lord Cobham, who lived in Cooling Castle. The interior of the vestry is completely lined with cockle shells, the emblem of Saint James. The stained glass in the east window dates from 1897; it depicts the Ascension, and was made by Clayton and Bell. The single-manual organ was probably made in about 1880 by A. Kirkland.

There are three bells, all dating from the 17th century, but they are not ringable. The tenor bears the inscription "MICHAEL DARBIE MADE ME 1651" and is estimated to be 6 long cwt 3 qr (760 lb or 340 kg). According to an inspection in 2004 by Peter Romney the frame appears to be medieval. The fittings may be from 1675, the date of the youngest bell. Although fitted with full wheels, Romney thinks that the bells were never rung full circle, based on the absence of stays and the incorrect location of the ground pulleys. It is possible that the bells are recasts of earlier bells, but it is also possible that the apparently medieval frame may itself be a 17th-century copy.

== External features ==
In the churchyard is a chest tomb dating from the early or middle part of the 18th century. It is designated as a Grade II listed building. Also in the churchyard is a row of 13 children's gravestones, measuring about 18 inches (46 cm) long; these have come to be known as "Pip's Graves".

== See also ==
- List of churches preserved by the Churches Conservation Trust in South East England
