= Intra =

Intra may refer to:

- Intra (album), a 2005 album by metal band Ram-Zet
- Intra, Italy, a former comune which is now a frazione of Verbania
- Intra Airways, British airline
- Intra (software), anti Internet censorship Android app by Google
- Intra-frame coding, a video compression technique that utilizes I-frames, a video compression picture type
- Intra Bank, Lebanese bank
- Intra (Teka), Norwegian company
- Groupe INTRA, French emergency response organization
- AVC-Intra, a type of video coding

== People with the surname ==
- Enrico Intra (born 1935), Italian pianist, composer, and conductor
- Giovanni Intra (1968–2002), New Zealand artist, writer, and art dealer
