= Eastgate House, Rochester =

Eastgate House
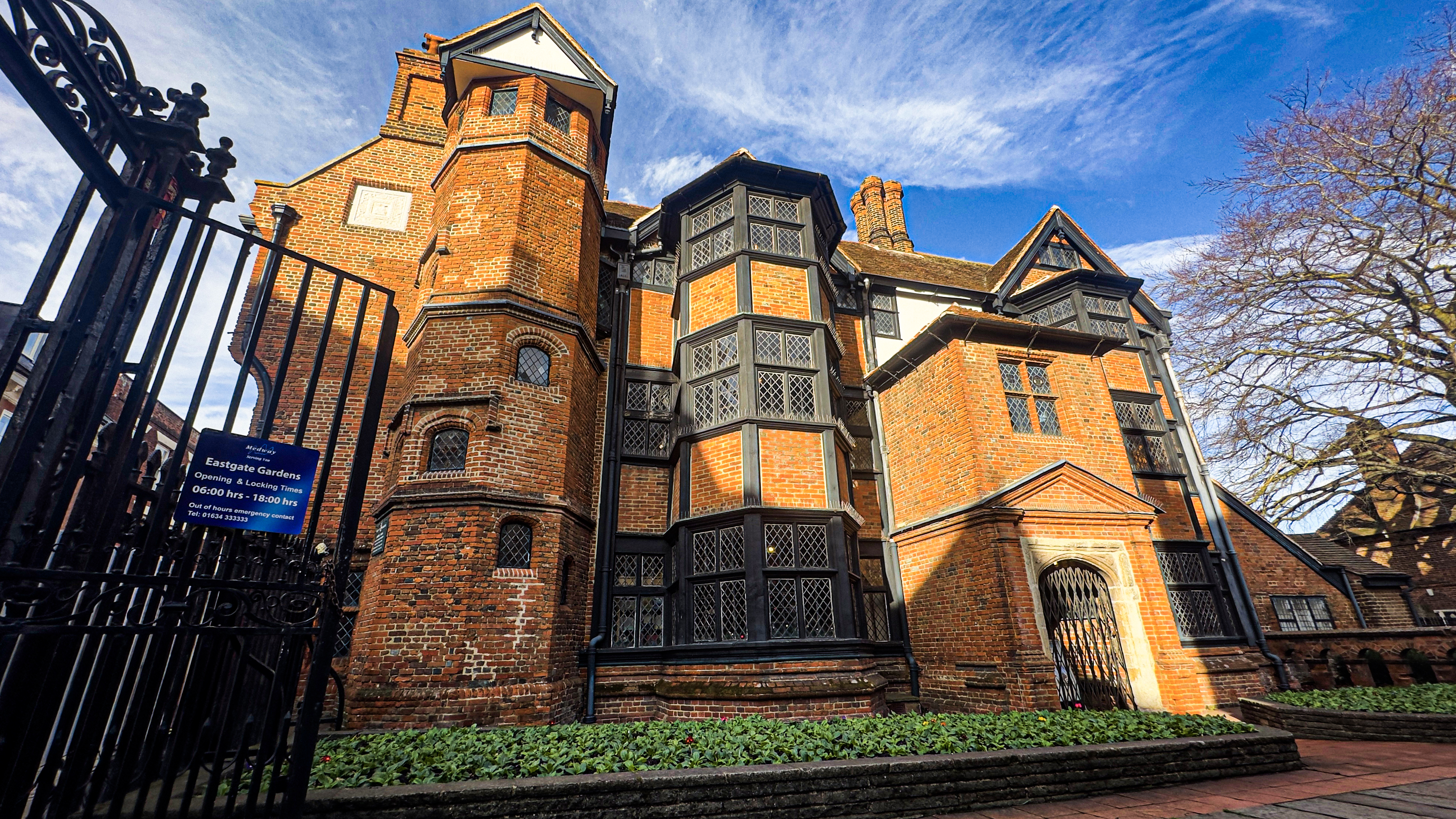
- Eastgate House viewed from Eastgate Gardens

- Eastgate House location in Kent
- 51°23′14″N 0°30′23″E
- OS grid reference: TQ74486833

History
- Built: 1590/1
- Built for: Sir Peter Buck

Site notes
- Governing body: Eastgate House Trust

Listed Building
- Type: Grade II*
- Designated: 24 October 1950
- Reference no.: 1086482

Eastgate House is a Grade I listed Elizabethan townhouse in Rochester, Kent, England. It is notable for its association with author Charles Dickens, featuring as Westgate in The Pickwick Papers and as the Nun's House in The Mystery of Edwin Drood. Now a Dickens Museum, the grounds of Eastgate House contain the Swiss chalet in which Dickens penned several of his novels.

== History ==
It was built in the 1590s for Sir Peter Buck, Mayor of Medway and Clerk of the Cheque at Chatham Dockyard. The house then became home to five generations of his family. In 1687, the Parker family inhabited the house and then in the 1750s, the Bartholemew family owned the house until the mid-18th century. In 1761, it was owned by Annabel Darwin. Then in 1791, it was occupied by James Reed. It is unclear who first set up a school on the site (James or his widow). The school is mentioned in as a freeschool in 'The History and Antiquities of Rochester and Its Environs' by Samuel Denne in 1772. In 1841, it became a Victorian boarding school for girls governed by Rebecca Norton. The house is famous for its association with Dickens, featuring as 'Westgate' in The Pickwick Papers in 1836, and then as the 'Nun's House' in The Mystery of Edwin Drood in 1870.

In the 1870s, it became a private house once more, owned by Samual Shaw, a wholesale coal merchant. Who was born in Wandsworth, Surrey. This was to be their last home in England, before leaving for Canada. It became a young men's hostel in 1890 and then a temperance restaurant in 1897. In 1903, Rochester City Council converted the building into a municipal library and museum in celebration of Queen Victoria's Diamond Jubilee. Eastgate was then used as a Dickens Museum (from 1923) and its grounds contain the Swiss chalet in which Dickens penned several of his novels, relocated from Gad's Hill in the 1960s. In 2004, the Dickens Centre closed. In December 2012, Medway Council obtained £1.28 million in funding from the Heritage Lottery Fund to transform the house into an exhibition centre for art and history events, with improved access and visitor facilities. In July 2017, it reopened and is now open to the public on Thursday, Friday and Saturday.

== Architecture ==
The brick exterior is fragile and expensive to repair. The structure has the date 1591 on a beam in one of the upper rooms of the house. Current renovations include removal of pipework and wiring. Additional elements include heating and lighting features, as well as a new lift and a staircase to replace one which was previously removed. Conservators made some discoveries after removing layers of interior paint: the mysterious drawing of a man's face within a 16th-century setting, and a pattern of black lines with similarity to a plaster painting discovered on the second floor.

== Grounds ==
At the time of completion, the grounds of the house were "extremely large stretching westward a considerable distance along St. Martins Lane to St Chad's Lane and northward". In the 1920s, Sir Guy Dawber designed the gardens, annexe building and cottage of the property.
