= Temple Manor =

Grade I listed historic house museum in Strood, England

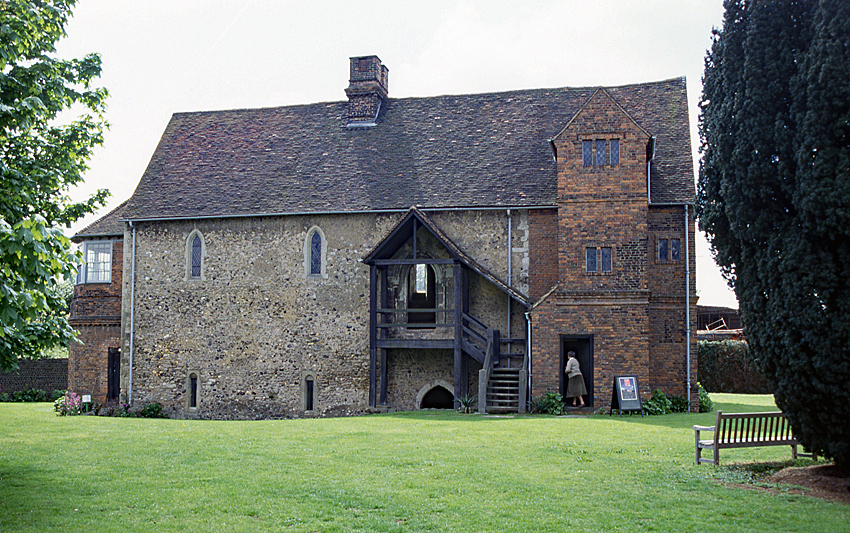
- Temple Manor

- Location within Kent
- 51°23′19″N 0°29′17″E
- Location: Knight Road; Strood, England
- OS grid reference: TQ7320768450

History
- Manor granted to Knights Templar: 1159
- Built: early C13
- Built for: Knights Templar

Site notes
- Restored: Early 1950s
- Restored by: Ministry of Works
- Owner: English Heritage

Scheduled monument
- Official name: Temple Manor
- Designated: 20 August 1947
- Reference no.: 1011805

Listed Building – Grade I
- Official name: Temple Manor
- Designated: 24 October 1950
- Reference no.: 1120910

Temple Manor is a scheduled monument and grade I listed building in Strood, Kent. The Manor has been owned by various religious, national and farming owners over 600 years. The building has been added to and adapted over the centuries, but the basic structure is now clearly visible.

The house is now owned by English Heritage and is open to the public on weekends in season.

A camera is a subsidiary farm of a preceptory (a medieval monastery of the military orders of Knights Templar or Knights Hospitaller). Camerae are very rare in England with less than 40 known examples. In view of this rarity, and their importance in supporting the monastic communities of the preceptories (examples of which are also rare), all camerae exhibiting archaeological survival are identified as nationally important.

— Introduction to the official listing record

== History ==
Some form of occupation of the site has occurred since Roman times, a burial to the south-east of the present building is thought to date from then.

The larger part of the parish of Strood was the rural area stretching south from the urbanised bridgehead along the River Medway. This area formed the Manor of Strood and lay within the Hundred of Shamel. Following The Anarchy of 1135 to 1153 the Crown was in debt to the Knights Templar and probably this was why the manor was given to them in 1159 by Henry II. The manor was in the Hundred of Shamel and the dues and administrative rights went with it. There were only six to fifteen actual Knights Templar in England, along with maybe 140 brethren who handled administration. Strood may not even have had a permanent brethren presence, possibly a lay-reeve or baliff would have run the estate. The Templars established a hall, barns and stables by 1185 but these were in timber and no trace remains above ground. The stone building visible today was originally built around 1240. It is not known precisely why Strood was rebuilt, perhaps to provide suitable lodging for dignitaries travelling along Watling Street between London and the continent via Dover.

When the Knights Templar were suppressed in 1312 all their assets passed to the Knights Hospitaller, including Temple Manor. Around this time the building was extended to the north with a ground-floor hall roughly 14 feet (4.3 m) wide. Many of the scattered farm buildings were cleared between 1308–1344 and evidence from archaeology indicates relatively little disturbance during the suppression of the Templars. It is thought therefore that the manor had already become simply a farm to generate rent money for its owner. It is possible that the tenants were the Creyes, known to be the wealthiest family in Strood but who held not feudal lands. An inventory of Templar estates in 1313 lists a hall, a chamber, a chapel and a barn as being at Strood. Some years after the suppression of the Templars, the Grand Prior of the Hospitallers complained that the king was still occupying ex-Templar lands at Denny, Cambridgeshire and Strood. The complaint was to no avail and in 1324 the lands were ceded to the King. In 1342 Edward III granted it to Mary of St Pol, Countess of Pembroke who in turn granted it to her nunnery at Denny Cambridgeshire. Given the lack of transport at the time, it could not have been used to supply the nunnery with goods, and so must have simply been a source of revenue.

The following century a new wing was added to the north of the building at its western end, where the entrances are. This wing was 16 feet (4.9 m) (E-W) by 27 feet (8.2 m) (N-S) with a parlour below and chambers above. The ground-floor hall was reduced in status to a kitchen and further additions (in timber) were made to the north.

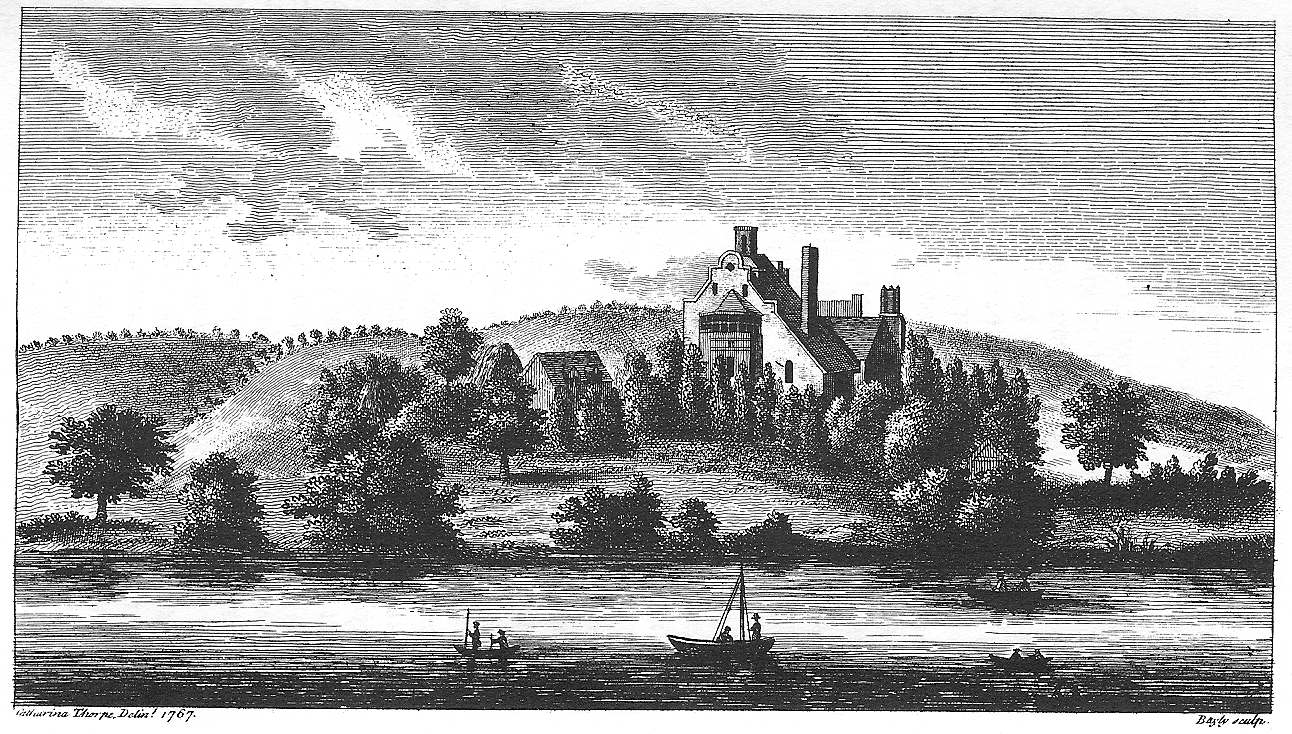
View of Temple Manor from Rochester, 1767 (from Hasted's History of Kent)

At the dissolution of the monasteries the Abbey of Denny was dissolved and both it and Temple Manor granted to Edward Elrington in 1539. He sold Temple Manor to the local Cobham family. Following a conviction for conspiracy against James VI and I 1603 Lord Cobham's property was seized by Robert Cecil. Using a London lawyer called Hyde, Cecil sold it on to Ludovic Stewart the future Duke of Richmond. Richmond in his turn sold it to Isaac Blake. The Blake family were possibly the richest family in Strood at the time. The Blakes may have been sitting tenants for some years, Isaac was a Churchwarden and a dealer in iron-ware and possibly scrap. The Blakes were responsible for the brick extensions and continued to hold it until the 18th century.

A succession of owners followed and as the fortunes of the estate declined parts were sold off until the residue was sold to the City of Rochester in the 1930s. At this stage it was well cared for and surrounded by a fine garden. Locally there was a debate over its future, the council planned to use the surrounding site for industrial development. Having no obvious use for the house, a committee was formed to preserve it. The Second World War interrupted plans, and by in 1947 the site was recognised and scheduled. However neglect and vandalism had taken their toll; the barn had fallen down and the roof collapsed. In 1950 the building was listed as grade I and any plans for its demolition were thwarted. During the early 1950s the Ministry of Works oversaw work to preserve and restore the building as it can be seen today.

== Description ==
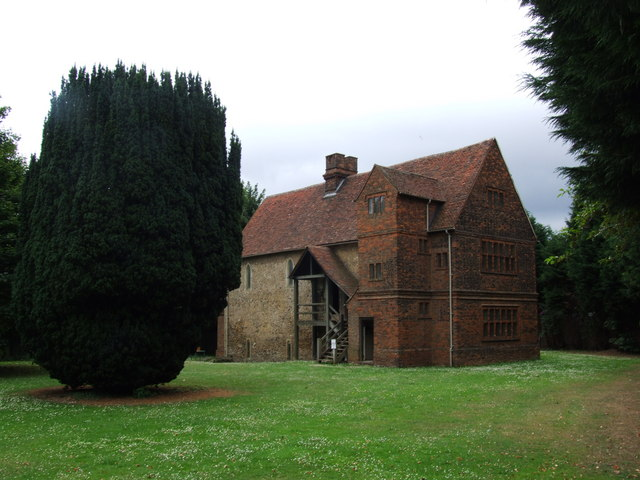
View from the north-west showing the brick extension and turret

The main section of the building has a stone-built vaulted undercroft which supports the single large room above. This style of building is known as a first-floor hall. (Note: British and American usage of first floor differs, the first floor here is the floor above the ground floor.) The upper room (reached by an external stair) was the higher status area, providing accommodation for travelling knights and officials. This original section is 50 feet (15 m) by 22 feet (6.7 m), and the undercroft walls are 2 feet 6 inches (0.76 m) thick. Construction is of flint and ragstone rubble with ashlar dressings.

The doorway to the upper chamber is ornate with Purbeck marble shafts to either side and mouldings above. There was originally a drawbar running into holes. Originally the walls would have been plastered smooth and painted like stone. The original division of the hall was into a high status decorated room to the west and a simpler room to the east. The fireplaces and stack which dominate the room are from the 17th-century modifications by the Blakes. The entrance door led directly into the western room which would have been used for communal activities and for eating. The better lit eastern end was probably a chamber, similar to those provided at episcopal and royal palaces for visiting guests. Heating would have been by brazier, there is plenty of height and no evidence of medieval filerplaces. There is continuous wall seating from which pillars of purbeck marble rose to carry an arcade. This arcade has been mutilated and partially restored. Such plaster as remains carries later graffiti including a name, possibly Cray. (Note: This "graffiti" may have been done legally by the owners, not as vandalism.) The chamber at the eastern end has two splayed recesses, tentatively identified as a wash baison and a privy within a screened off garderobe. Scattered floor tiles have been found and it is probable that the upper floor was tiled prior to the departure of the Templars. At the western end there appears to have been a form of serving hatch from a now lost and unrecorded western extension. A later oven or still is of unknown purpose.

The undercroft has three bays of quadrapartite ribbed vaults. The ribs are of simple decoration with excellent dressed infill. Illumination is from wide windows, externally lancet and internally square headed with the original oak lintels still in place. Originally the windows were fitted with iron bars, possibly for security to what was originally, and remained, a cellar.

The western extension is of three floors entered by a separate ground floor door. The stair is housed in a turret and gives access to three floors with a single room on each floor. There is no communication between the extension and the original structure. The brickwork is in English bond with moulded string courses.

The eastern extension had a small store below supporting a wooden framed gazebo above. The gazebo forms an extension to the original hall and when built would have commanded extensive views over the River Medway. The original situation is best appreciated from the 1767 engraving in Hasted (above). Mature trees and a railway embankment block any such view today.

The roof was replaced in the 1950s restoration after much of the original collapsed from the neglect the building suffered during the war.
