= Restoration House =

Historic house in Kent, England

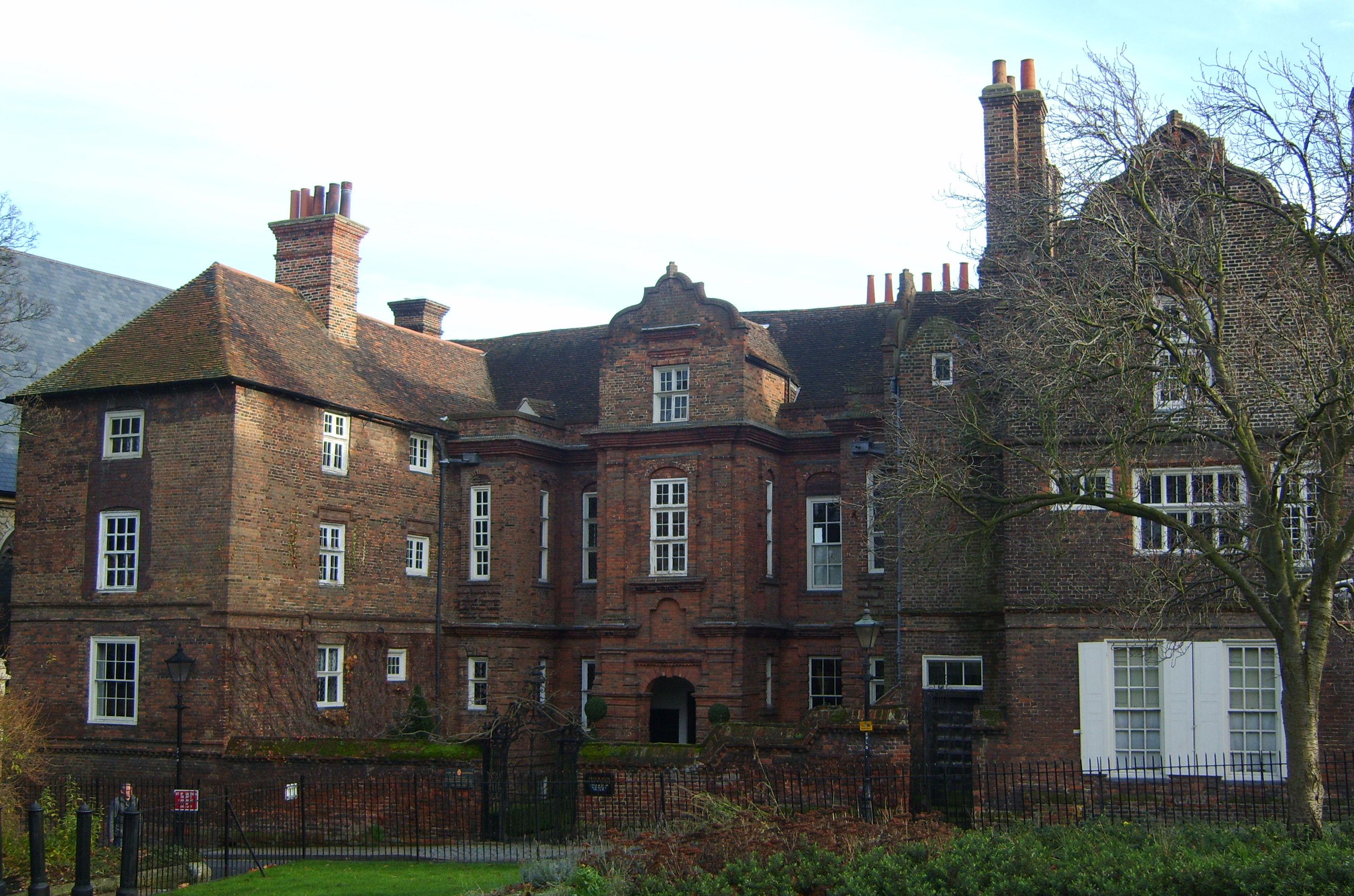
- Restoration House from The Vines
- Etymology: Visit of King Charles II on the eve of his restoration

General information
- Status: Completed
- Location: Rochester, Kent, Restoration House, 17-19 Crow Lane, United Kingdom
- Coordinates: 51°23′10″N 0°30′16″E
- Groundbreaking: 1454
- Renovation cost: £500,000
- Owner: Jonathan Wilmot; Robert Tucker

Technical details
- Material: Red brick, ragstone, and knapped flint

Design and construction
- Known for: Visit of King Charles II on the eve of his restoration

Renovating team
- Architects: Rod Hull and subsequent owners

Other information
- Number of rooms: 38
- Public transit: Rochester Community Hub (Stop N & C) on Corporation Street; 6 minute walk to Restoration House.; Rochester railway station; 7 minute walk to Restoration House.

Website
- https://www.restorationhouse.co.uk/

Listed Building – Grade I
- Official name: Restoration House including wall and gate piers attached to front
- Designated: 24 October 1950
- Reference no.: 1185341

Listed Building – Grade II
- Official name: Remains of summer house in garden 25 metres east of Restoration House
- Designated: 2 December 1991
- Reference no.: 1086519

Listed Building – Grade II
- Official name: Flint and diapered brick wall at rear of Nos 1 and 3, East Row
- Designated: 23 January 2008
- Reference no.: 1392369

Restoration House is an Elizabethan mansion Manor House in Rochester, Kent. It is so named after a visit by King Charles II on the eve of his restoration in 1660.

Charles had landed in Dover on 25 May 1660 and by the evening of the 28th arrived in Rochester. He was received by the Mayor and eventually retired for the night to the home of Colonel Gibbon. The following day Charles continued to London and was proclaimed King on 29 May, his 30th birthday. Although the home of Colonel Gibbon, the property was actually owned by Sir Francis Clerke (he was knighted during the visit), a fact which has led to confusion in the past.

Although it is a private home, the house and garden are open to the public during the summer. The house is protected as a Grade I listed building.

== History ==
Restoration House was originally two medieval buildings (1454 and 1502–22) with a space between. They were joined in 1640–1660 (tree ring data from roof) by inserting a third building between the two, to create a larger house. The first owner of the completed house was Henry Clerke, a lawyer and Rochester MP. Clerke caused further works in 1670, the refacing of the entrance facade, the Great Staircase and other internal works. The house was then bought by William Bockenham. It was owned by Stephen T. Aveling in the late 19th century, and he wrote a history of the house which was published in Vol. 15 of "Archaeologia Cantiana".

Between the years 1933 to 1978 the home was owned by Mackeys, a Scottish family. They were known for being tight on spending. The building was then sold to William Moreton (sold by Mrs Mackey). Then the house was purchased for £270,000 by the English entertainer Rod Hull, in 1986, to save it from being turned into a car park; and he then spent another £500,000 restoring it. It was taken by the Receiver in 1994 to cover an unpaid tax bill.

The current owners over the past decade have uncovered decoration schemes from the mid 17th century, which reveal the fashionable taste of the period, much influenced by the fashions on the continent.

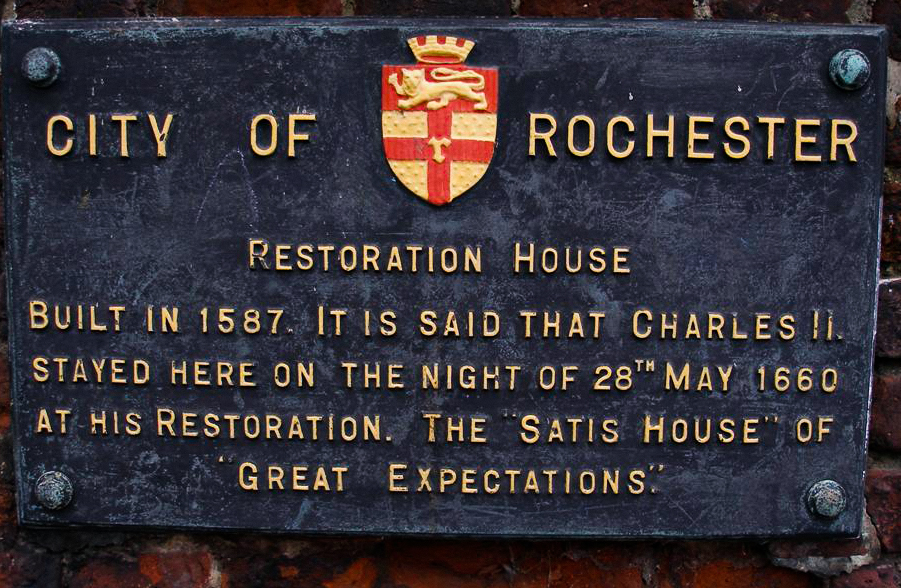
City of Rochester Restoration House plaque

== Charles Dickens ==
According to the biographer John Forster, the novelist Charles Dickens, who lived nearby, used Restoration House as a model for Miss Havisham's Satis House in Great Expectations. The name "Satis House" belongs to the house where Rochester MP, Sir Richard Watts, entertained Queen Elizabeth I; it is now the administrative office of King's School, Rochester.
