= Edmund of Hadenham =

English chronicler

Edmund of Hadenham (fl. 1307), was a monk of Rochester and an English chronicler.

On the authority of William Lambard, the Kentish topographer, a historical work preserved in the Cottonian Library in the British Museum is ascribed to Edmund. This manuscript, according to Henry Wharton, contains a chronicle, which is a copy of the Flores Historiarum. It is in one handwriting down to 1307, except that it contains a number of interspersed notices relating to the history of Rochester. These Rochester annals are printed in Wharton's 'Anglia Sacra,' i. 341-355 (1691). After 1307 there is a continuation in another hand, extending to 1377, but not dealing with Rochester affairs.

The manuscript formerly belonged to John Joscelin; Lambard, in attributing the work to Hadenham, may have had a different copy before him.

Josiah Cox Russell argued in 1935 that John of Renham, prior of Rochester, was at least a part-author of the annals.

== See also ==
- Annals of Rochester
