= Rochester, Kent =

Town in Kent, England

Coordinates: 51.375°N 0.500°E

Rochester
- Town
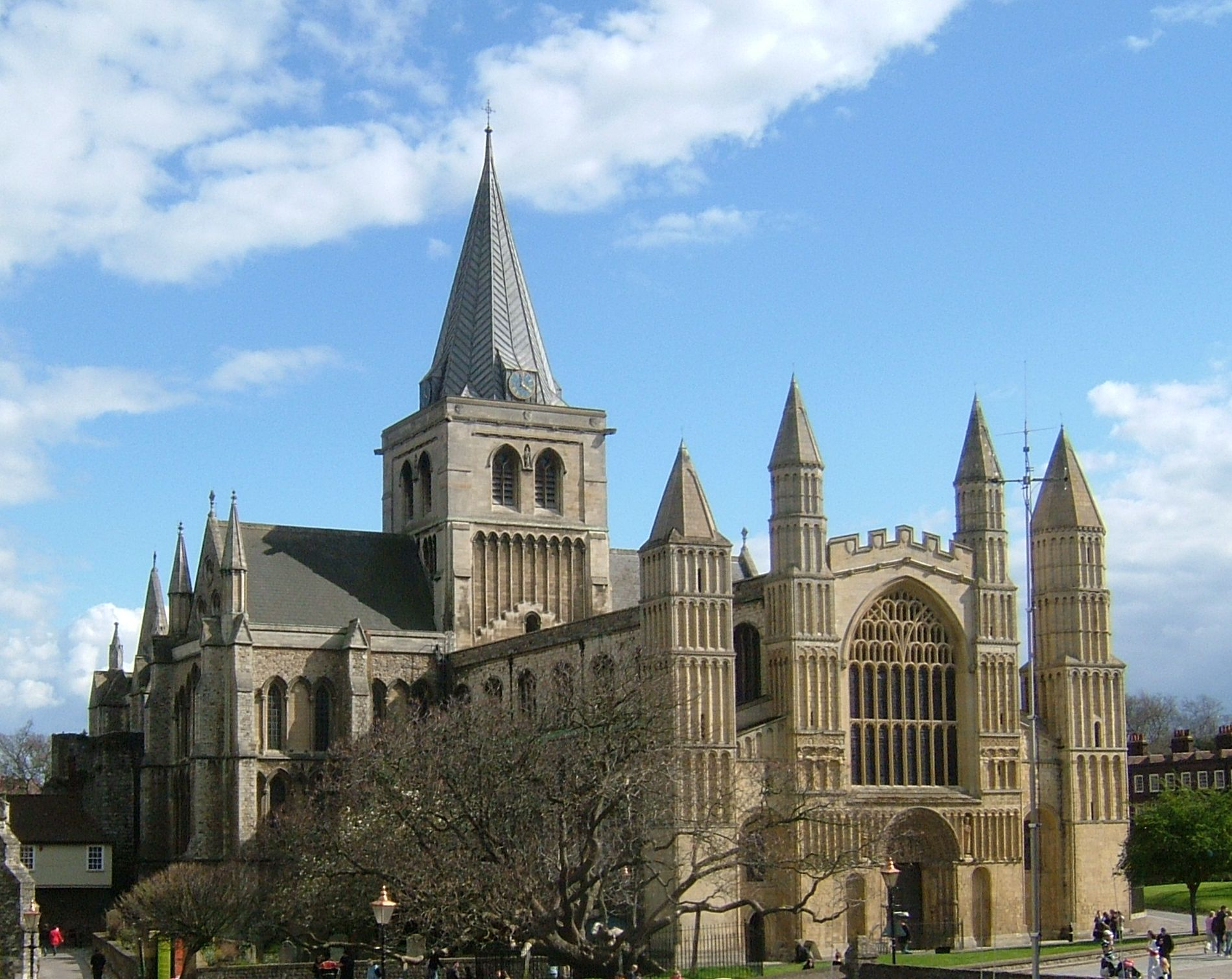
- Rochester Cathedral viewed from the west at Castle Gardens

- Location within Kent
- Population: 62,982 (2011 Census)
- OS grid reference: TQ739684
- Unitary authority: Medway
- Ceremonial county: Kent
- Region: South East
- Country: England
- Sovereign state: United Kingdom
- Post town: ROCHESTER
- Postcode district: ME1, ME2
- Dialling code: 01634
- Police: Kent
- Fire: Kent
- Ambulance: South East Coast
- UK Parliament: Rochester and Strood

Rochester (/ˈrɒtʃɪstər/ ROTCH-iss-tər) is a port town in the unitary authority of Medway, in Kent, England. It is at the lowest bridging point of the River Medway, about 30 miles (50 km) east-southeast of London. The town forms a conurbation with neighbouring towns Chatham, Rainham, Strood and Gillingham. Rochester was a city until losing its status as one in 1998 following the forming of Medway and failing to protect its status as a city, the first city to do so in the history of the United Kingdom. There have been ongoing campaigns to reinstate the city status for Rochester. In 2011 it had a population of 62,982.

Rochester was for many years a favourite of Charles Dickens, who owned nearby Gads Hill Place, Higham, basing many of his novels on the area. The Diocese of Rochester, the second-oldest in England, is centred on Rochester Cathedral and was responsible for founding a school, now The King's School, in 604 AD, which is recognised as the second-oldest continuously running school in the world. Rochester Castle, built by Bishop Gundulf of Rochester, has one of the best-preserved keeps in either England or France. During the First Barons' War (1215–1217) in King John's reign, baronial forces captured the castle from Archbishop Stephen Langton and held it against the king, who then besieged it.

As well as the historic centre, the suburbs of Borstal and The Delce are also part of Rochester, forming part of the Medway Towns urban area with a population of about 250,000.

== Toponymy ==
The Romano-British name for Rochester was Durobrivae, later Durobrivis c. 730 and Dorobrevis in 844. The two commonly cited origins of this name are that it either came from "stronghold by the bridge(s)" or is the latinisation of the British word Dourbruf meaning "swiftstream". Durobrivis was pronounced 'Robrivis. Later, the word cæster (=castle, from Latin castrum) was added to the name, and the city was called Robrivis Cæster. Bede mentions the city in c. 730 and calls it Hrofes cæster, mistaking its meaning as Hrofi's fortified camp. From this came c. 730 Hrofæscæstre, 811 Hrofescester, 1086 Rovescester, 1610 Rochester. The Latinised adjective 'Roffensis' refers to Rochester.

== History ==
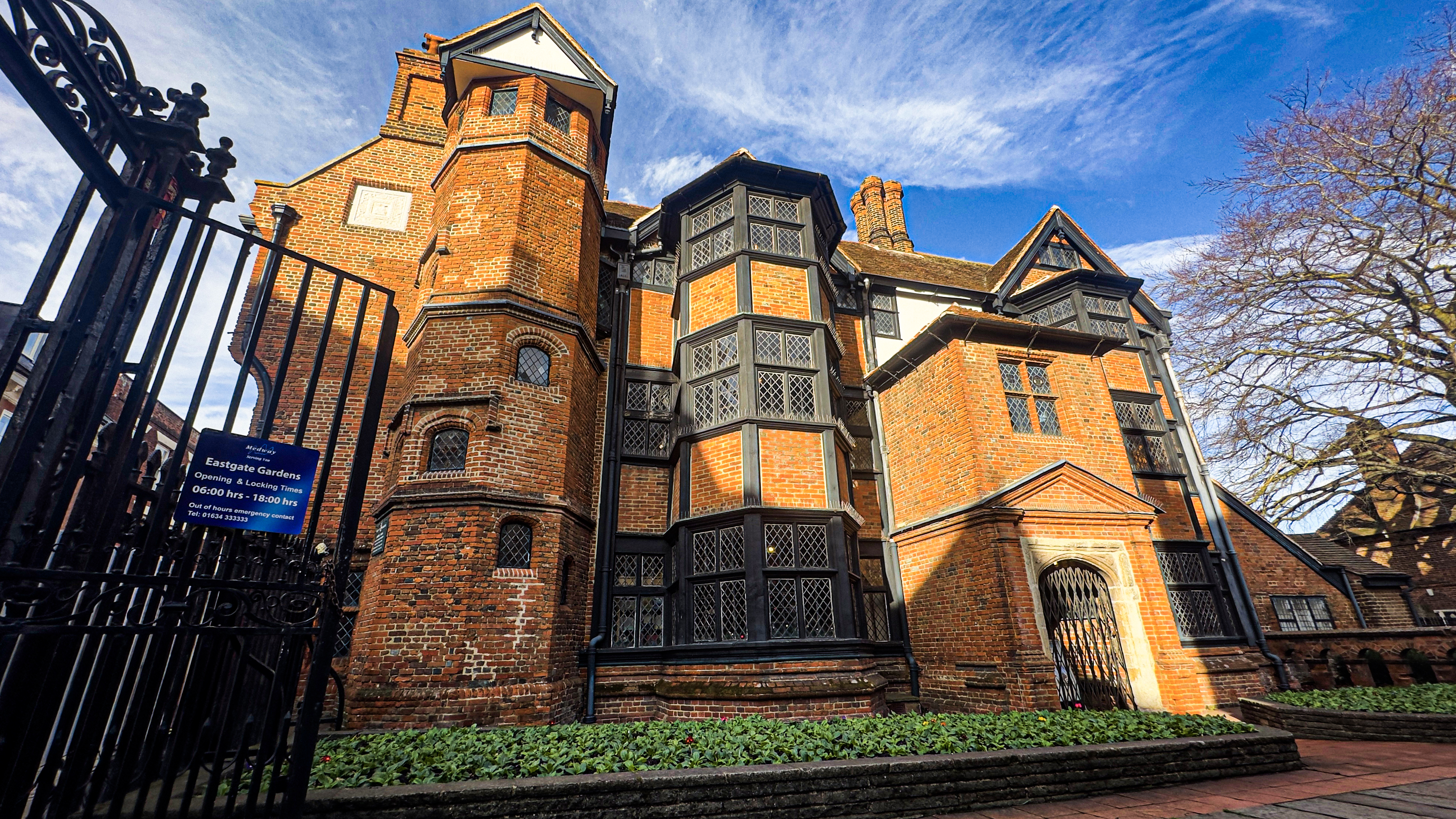
Eastgate House, Rochester

Remains from the Neolithic Age have been found in the vicinity of Rochester; over time, it has been variously occupied by Celts, Romans, Jutes and/or Saxons. During the Celtic Period, it was one of the two administrative centres of the Cantiaci tribe. During the Roman conquest of Britain, a decisive battle was fought at the Medway somewhere near Rochester. The first bridge was subsequently constructed early in the Roman period. During the later Roman Period, the settlement was walled in stone. King Æthelberht of Kent (560–616) established a legal system which has been preserved in the 12th-century Textus Roffensis. In AD 604, the bishopric and Rochester Cathedral were founded. During this period, from the recall of the legions until the Norman Conquest, Rochester was sacked at least twice and besieged on another occasion.

The medieval period saw the building of the current Rochester Cathedral (1080–1130, 1227 and 1343), the building of two castles and the establishment of a significant town. Rochester Castle saw action in the sieges of 1215 and 1264. Rochester's basic street plan was set out, constrained by the River Medway, Watling Street, Rochester Priory and Rochester Castle.

Rochester has produced two martyrs: St John Fisher, executed by Henry VIII for refusing to sanction the divorce of Catherine of Aragon; and Bishop Nicholas Ridley, executed by Queen Mary for being an English Reformation protestant.

=== Military history ===
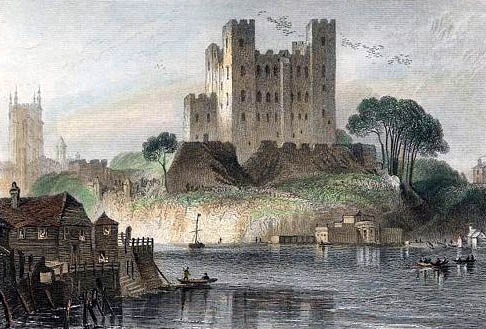
Rochester Castle from across the Medway (engraving, G.F. Sargent c. 1836)

Rochester has for centuries been of great strategic importance through its position near the confluence of the Thames and the Medway. Rochester Castle was built to guard the river crossing. In 1667, the city was raided by the Dutch fleet as part of the Second Anglo-Dutch War. The Dutch, commanded by Admiral de Ruijter, broke through the chain at Upnor and sailed to Rochester Bridge, capturing and burning part of the English Fleet.

The founding of the Royal Navy Dockyard at Chatham witnessed the beginning of the long supremacy of the Royal Navy. The town, as part of the Medway Towns, is surrounded by two circles of fortresses; the inner line built during the Napoleonic Wars consists of Fort Clarence, Fort Pitt, Fort Amherst and Fort Gillingham. The outer line of Palmerston Forts was built during the 1860s in light of the report by the Royal Commission on the Defence of the United Kingdom and consists of Fort Borstal, Fort Bridgewood, Fort Luton, and the Twydall Redoubts, with two additional forts on islands in the Medway, namely Fort Hoo and Fort Darnet.

During the First World War the Short Brothers' aircraft manufacturing company developed the first plane to launch a torpedo, the Short Admiralty Type 184, at its seaplane factory on the River Medway not far from Rochester Castle. During the Interwar Period between the First World War and the Second World War the company established a worldwide reputation as a constructor of flying boats with aircraft such as the Singapore, Empire 'C'-Class and Sunderland. During the Second World War, Shorts also designed and manufactured the first four-engined bomber, the Stirling.

The decline in the naval power of the United Kingdom and shipbuilding competitiveness led to HM Government decommissioning the Royal Navy Shipyard at Chatham in 1984, which led to the subsequent demise of much local maritime industry. Rochester and its neighbouring communities were hit hard by this and have experienced a painful adjustment to a post-industrial economy, with much social deprivation and unemployment resulting. On the closure of Chatham Dockyard on 31 March 1984 the area experienced an unprecedented surge in unemployment to 24 percent; this had dropped to 2.4 percent of the local population by 2014.

=== Civic history and traditions ===
Rochester was recognised as a City from 1211 to 1998. The City of Rochester's ancient status was unique, as it had no formal council or Charter Trustees nor a Mayor, instead having the office of Admiral of the River Medway, whose incumbent acted as de facto civic leader.

Since Norman times Rochester had always governed land on the other side of the Medway in Strood, which was known as Strood Intra; before 1835 it was about 100 yards (91 m) wide and stretched to Gun Lane. In the Municipal Corporations Act 1835 the boundaries were extended to include more of Strood and Frindsbury, and part of Chatham known as Chatham Intra.

Like many of the medieval towns of England, Rochester had civic Freemen whose historic duties and rights were abolished by the Municipal Corporations Act 1835. However, the Guild of Free Fishers and Dredgers continues to the present day and retains rights, duties and responsibilities on the Medway, between Sheerness and Hawkwood Stone. This ancient corporate body convenes at the Admiralty Court whose Jury of Freemen is responsible for the conservancy of the River as enshrined in current legislation. The City Freedom can be obtained by residents after serving a period of "servitude", i.e. apprenticeship (traditionally seven years), before admission as a Freeman. The annual ceremonial Beating of the Bounds by the River Medway takes place after the Admiralty Court, usually on the first Saturday of July.

=== Ecclesiastical parishes ===
Arms of diocese of Rochester

There were three medieval parishes: St Nicholas', St Margaret's and St Clement's. St Clement's was in Horsewash Lane until the last vicar died in 1538 when it was joined with St Nicholas' parish; the church's last remaining foundations were finally removed when the railway was being constructed in the 1850s. St Nicholas' Church was built in 1421 beside the cathedral to serve as a parish church for the citizens of Rochester. The ancient cathedral included the Benedictine monastic priory of St Andrew with greater status than the local parishes. Rochester's pre-1537 diocese, under the jurisdiction of the Church of Rome, covered a vast area extending into East Anglia and included all of Essex.

As a result of the restructuring of the Church during the Reformation the cathedral was reconsecrated as the Cathedral Church of Christ and the Blessed Virgin Mary without parochial responsibilities, being a diocesan church. In the 19th century the parish of St Peter's was created to serve the burgeoning city with the new church being consecrated in 1859. Following demographic shifts, St Peter's and St Margaret's were recombined as a joint benefice in 1953 with the parish of St Nicholas with St Clement being absorbed in 1971. The combined parish is now the "Parish of St Peter with St Margaret", centred at the new (1973) Parish Centre in The Delce (St Peter's) with St Margaret's remaining as a chapel-of-ease. Old St Peter's was demolished in 1974, while St Nicholas' Church has been converted into the diocesan offices but remains consecrated. Continued expansion south has led to the creation of an additional more recent parish of St Justus (1956) covering The Tideway estate and surrounding area.

A church dedicated to St Mary the Virgin at Eastgate, which was of Anglo-Saxon foundation, is understood to have constituted a parish until the Middle Ages, but few records survive.

== Governance ==
On 1 April 1974, the City Council was abolished under the Local Government Act 1972, and the territory was merged with the District of Medway, Borough of Chatham and most of Strood Rural District, including the parishes of Cuxton, Halling and Cliffe, and the Hoo Peninsula, to form a new a local government district called the Borough of Medway, within the county of Kent. Medway Borough Council applied to inherit Rochester's city status, but this was refused; instead letters patent were granted constituting the area of the former Rochester local government district to be the City of Rochester, to "perpetuate the ancient name" and to recall "the long history and proud heritage of the said City". The Home Office said that the city status may be extended to the entire borough if it had "Rochester" in its name, so in 1979, Medway Borough Council renamed the borough to the Borough of Rochester-upon-Medway, and in 1982, Rochester's city status was transferred to the entire borough by letters patent, with the district being called the City of Rochester-upon-Medway. The Admiral of the River Medway was ex-officio Mayor of Rochester and this dignity transferred to the Mayor of Medway when that unitary authority was created, along with the Admiralty Court for the River which constitutes a committee of the council.

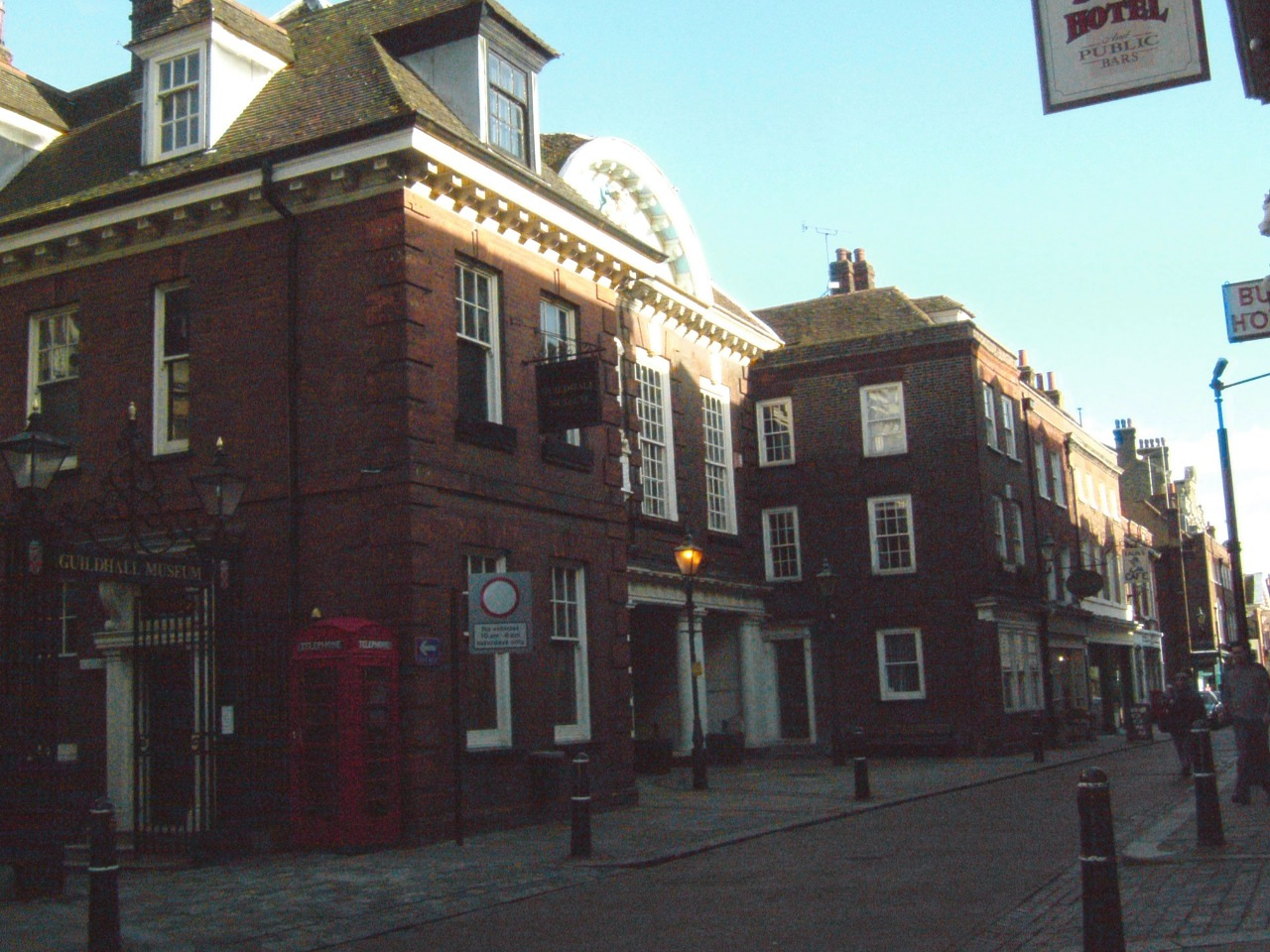
The Guildhall, Rochester

On 1 April 1998, the existing local government districts of Rochester-upon-Medway and Gillingham were abolished and became the new unitary authority of Medway. The Department of Environment, Transport and the Regions informed the city council that since it was the local government district that officially held City status under the 1982 Letters Patent, the council would need to appoint charter trustees to preserve its city status. However, no trustees were appointed and the city status was therefore lost when Rochester-upon-Medway was abolished as a local government district. The incoming Medway Council apparently only became aware of this when, in 2002, it was advised that Rochester was not on the Lord Chancellor's Office's list of cities.

In 2010, Medway Council started to refer to the "City of Medway" in promotional material, but it was rebuked and instructed not to do so in future by the Advertising Standards Authority. Subsequently, Medway Council has applied for City status for Medway as a whole, rather than merely for Rochester. Medway applied unsuccessfully for City status in 2000 and 2002 and again in the Queen's Diamond Jubilee Year of 2012. Any future bid to regain formal City status has been recommended to be made under the aegis of Rochester-upon-Medway.

The 2011 definition of Rochester includes Strood to the northwest and is defined as an urban subdivision with a 2011 population of 62,982. Strood makes up the majority of Rochester's population on the west bank of the river, making the town of Rochester itself on the east bank actually smaller and less populated than its neighbouring town; should the two towns ever separate Strood would be the larger of the two.

Lauren Edwards MP is the current Labour parliamentary representative for the constituency.

== Geography ==
Rochester lies within the area, known to geologists, as the London Basin. The low-lying Hoo peninsula to the north of the town consists of London Clay, and the alluvium brought down by the two rivers—the Thames and the Medway—whose confluence is in this area. The land rises from the river, and being on the dip slope of the North Downs, this consists of chalk surmounted by the Blackheath Beds of sand and gravel.

As a human settlement, Rochester became established as the lowest river crossing of the River Medway, well before the arrival of the Romans.

It is a focal point between two routes, being part of the main route connecting London with the Continent and the north–south routes following the course of the Medway connecting Maidstone and the Weald of Kent with the Thames and the North Sea. The Thames Marshes were an important source of salt. Rochester's roads follow north Kent's valleys and ridges of steep-sided chalk bournes. There are four ways out of town to the south: up Star Hill, via The Delce, along the Maidstone Road or through Borstal. The town is inextricably linked with the neighbouring Medway Towns but separated from Maidstone by a protective ridge known as the Downs, a designated area of Outstanding Natural Beauty.

At its most limited geographical size, Rochester is defined as the market town within the city walls, now associated with the historic medieval city. However, Rochester historically also included the ancient wards of Strood Intra on the river's west bank, and Chatham Intra as well as the three old parishes on the Medway's east bank.

The Diocese of Rochester is another geographical entity which can be referred to as Rochester.

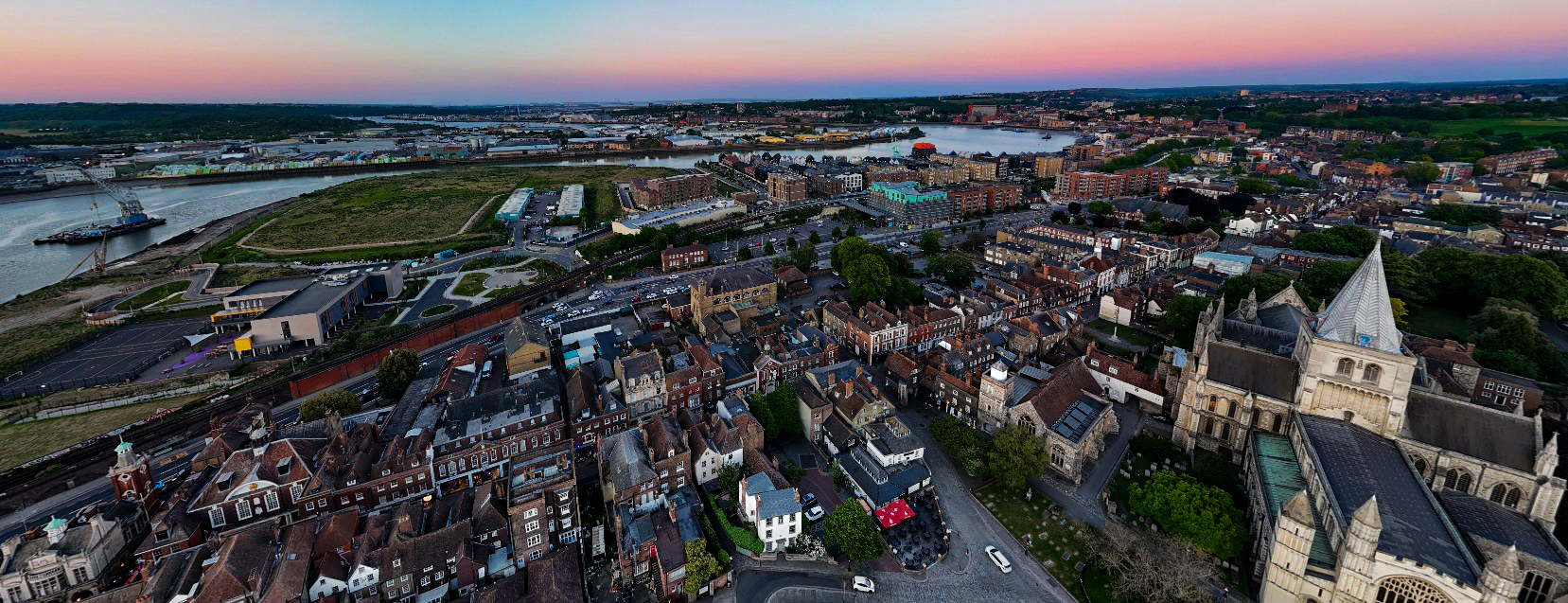
Aerial view of Rochester and its surrounding areas in the Medway district of Kent, England.

== Climate ==
Rochester has an oceanic climate similar to much of southern England, being accorded Köppen Climate Classification-subtype of "Cfb" (Marine West Coast Climate).

On 10 August 2003, neighbouring Gravesend recorded one of the highest temperatures since meteorological records began in the United Kingdom, with a reading of 38.1 degrees Celsius (100.6 degrees Fahrenheit), only beaten by Brogdale, near Faversham, 22 miles (35 km) to the ESE. The weather station at Brogdale is run by a volunteer, only reporting its data once a month, whereas Gravesend, which has an official Met Office site at the PLA pilot station, reports data hourly.

Being near the mouth of the Thames Estuary with the North Sea, Rochester is relatively close to continental Europe and enjoys a somewhat less temperate climate than other parts of Kent and most of East Anglia. It is therefore less cloudy, drier and less prone to Atlantic depressions with their associated wind and rain than western regions of Britain, as well as being hotter in summer and colder in winter. Rochester city centre's micro-climate is more accurately reflected by these officially recorded figures than by readings taken at Rochester Airport.

North and North West Kent continue to record higher temperatures in summer, sometimes being the hottest area of the country, eg. on the warmest day of 2011, when temperatures reached 33.1 degrees. Additionally, it holds at least two records for the year 2010, of 30.9 °C and 31.7 °C. Another record was set during England's Indian summer of 2011 with 29.9 °C, the highest temperature ever recorded in the UK for October.

Climate data for Stanford-le-Hope (nearest climate station to Gravesend) 1981–2010
Month	Jan	Feb	Mar	Apr	May	Jun	Jul	Aug	Sep	Oct	Nov	Dec	Year
Mean daily maximum °C (°F)	7.9 (46.2)	8.0 (46.4)	10.9 (51.6)	13.2 (55.8)	16.8 (62.2)	19.9 (67.8)	22.1 (71.8)	22.2 (72.0)	19.4 (66.9)	15.2 (59.4)	10.8 (51.4)	8.1 (46.6)	14.5 (58.2)
Mean daily minimum °C (°F)	2.2 (36.0)	1.6 (34.9)	3.3 (37.9)	4.7 (40.5)	7.5 (45.5)	10.5 (50.9)	13.0 (55.4)	12.5 (54.5)	10.3 (50.5)	7.4 (45.3)	4.4 (39.9)	2.4 (36.3)	6.7 (44.0)
Average precipitation mm (inches)	47.9 (1.89)	36.7 (1.44)	37.6 (1.48)	40.9 (1.61)	48.0 (1.89)	41.1 (1.62)	52.5 (2.07)	44.8 (1.76)	45.5 (1.79)	64.9 (2.56)	57.8 (2.28)	53.8 (2.12)	571.5 (22.51)
Mean monthly sunshine hours	60.0	77.7	113.4	161.5	194.3	198.7	208.7	195.5	151.1	117.9	74.0	48.6	1,601.4
Source: Met Office

== Buildings ==
Rochester comprises numerous important historic buildings, the most prominent of which are the Guildhall, the Corn Exchange, Restoration House, Eastgate House, as well as Rochester Castle and Rochester Cathedral. Many of the town centre's old buildings date from as early as the 14th century up to the 18th century. The chapel of St Bartholomew's Hospital dates from the ancient priory hospital's foundation in 1078.

In the 21st century the Riverside area north of the railway line, Rochester Riverside, has been redeveloped to provide new housing and a primary school.

== Economy ==
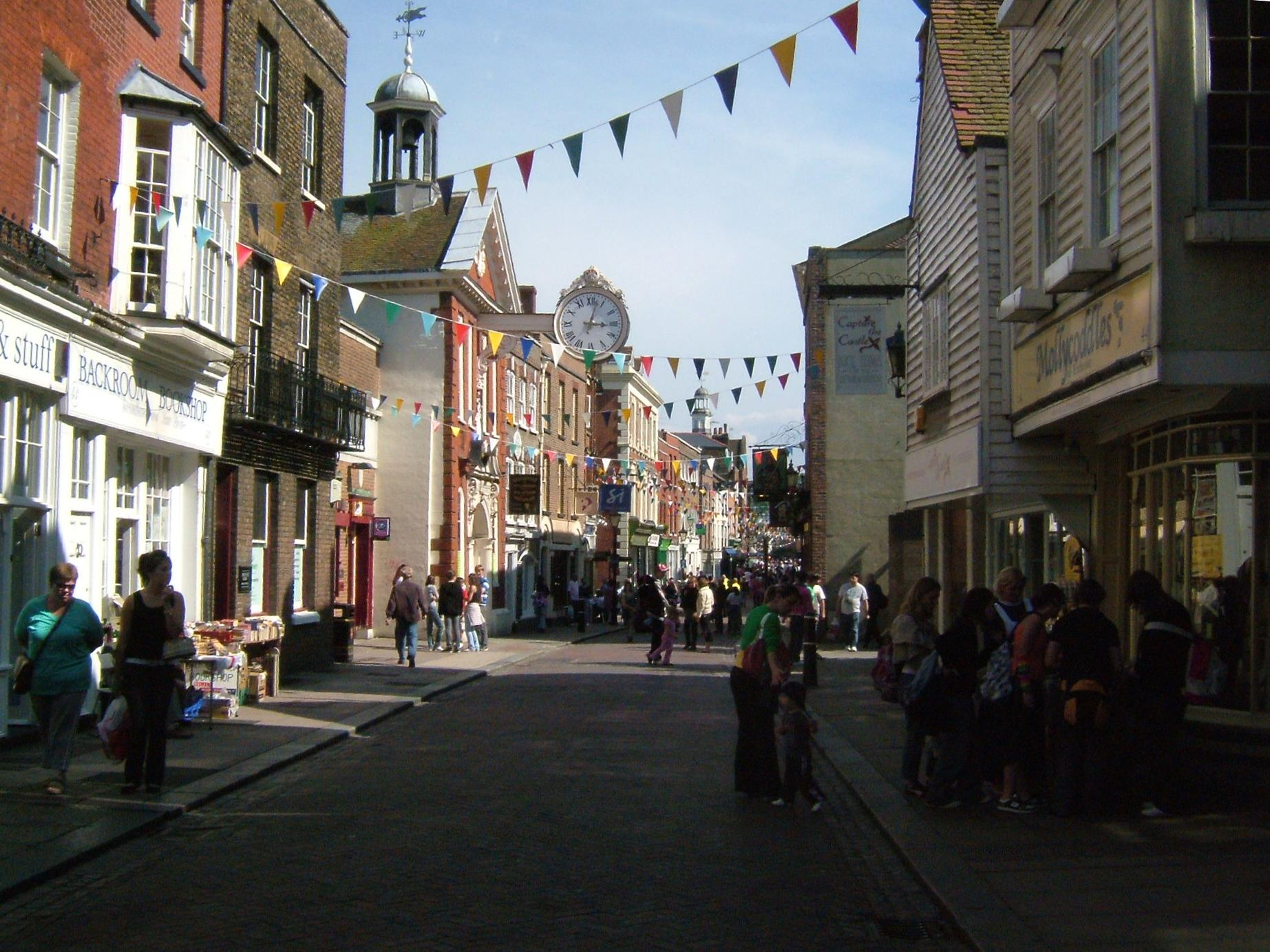
Rochester High Street

Thomas Aveling started a small business in 1850 producing and repairing agricultural plant equipment. In 1861 this became the firm of Aveling and Porter, which was to become the largest manufacturer of agricultural machinery and steam rollers in the country. Aveling was elected Admiral of the River Medway (i.e. Mayor of Rochester) for 1869–70.

Tourism is now a sector.

== Culture ==
=== Sweeps Festival ===
Since 1980 the city has seen the revival of the historic Rochester Jack-in-the-Green May Day dancing chimney sweeps tradition, which had died out in the early 1900s. Though not unique to Rochester (similar sweeps' gatherings were held across southern England, including in Bristol, Deptford, Whitstable and Hastings), its revival was directly inspired by Dickens' description of the celebration in Sketches by Boz.

The festival has since grown from a small gathering of local Morris dance sides to one of the largest in the world. The festival begins with the "Awakening of Jack-in-the-Green" ceremony, and continues in Rochester High Street over the May Bank Holiday weekend.

There are numerous other festivals in Rochester apart from the Sweeps Festival. The association with Dickens is the theme for Rochester's two Dickens Festivals held annually in June and December. The Medway Fuse Festival usually arranges performances in Rochester and the latest festival to take shape is the Rochester Literature Festival, the brainchild of three local writers.

=== Library ===
A new public library was built alongside the Adult Education Centre, Eastgate. This enabled the registry office to move from Maidstone Road, Chatham into the Corn Exchange on Rochester High Street (where the library was formerly housed). As mentioned in a report presented to Medway Council's Community Services Overview and Scrutiny Committee on 28 March 2006, the new library opened in late summer (2006).

=== Huguenot Museum ===
A new Huguenot Museum, which includes items from the collections of the French Hospital, was opened in Rochester on 13 May 2015, with support from the Heritage Lottery Fund and individual donations.

=== Theatre ===
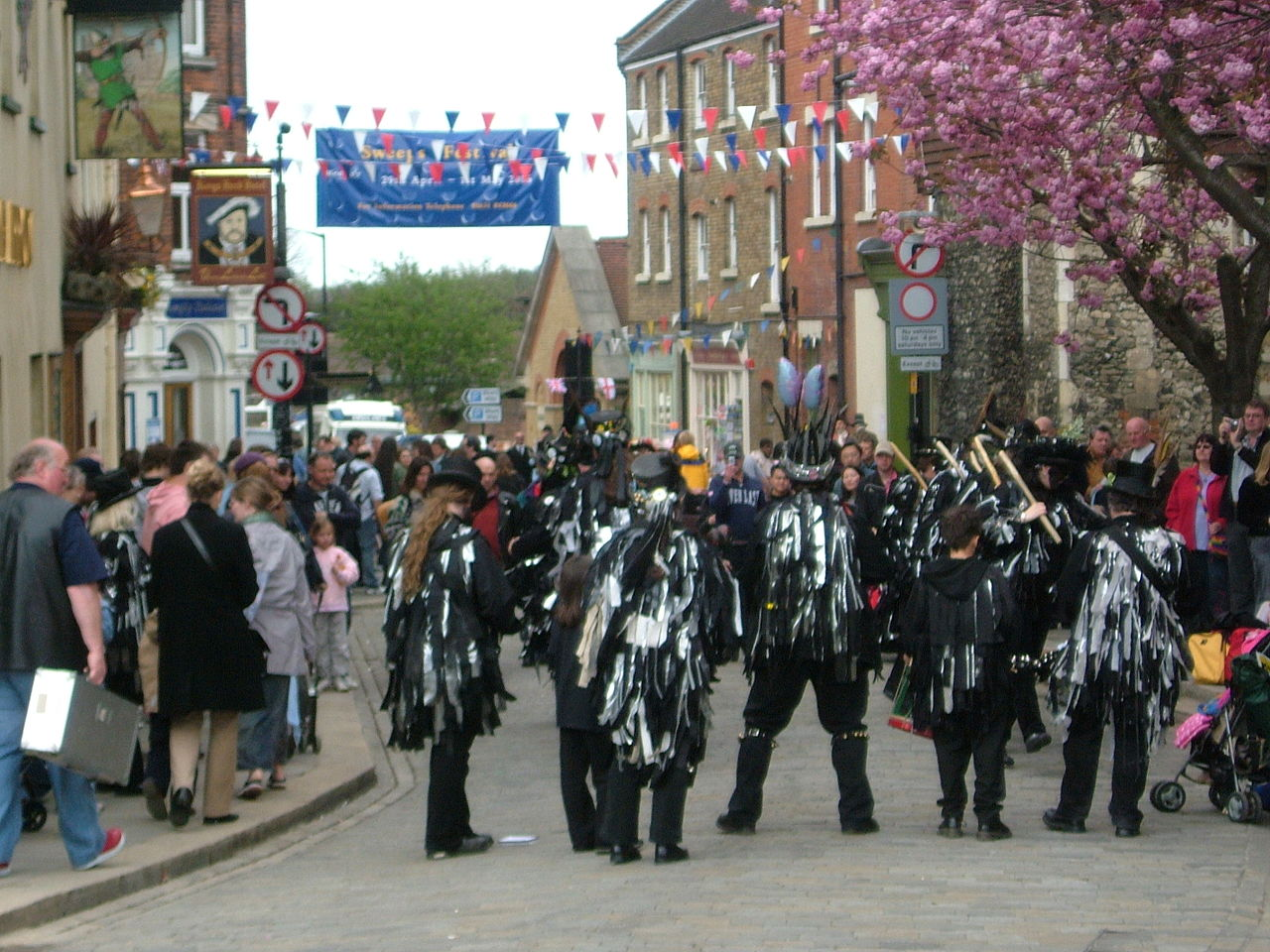
Sweeps festival in 2006

There is a small amateur theatre, Medway Little Theatre, on St Margaret's Banks, Rochester High Street (the part of the High Street that continues from Star Hill towards Chatham) and just opposite the former railway station. Converted from a building which in its almost 200-year history had been, amongst other things, a wine merchants, warehouse and printing works the theatre's first season was in 1958. Since then hundreds of plays have been presented ranging from Shakespeare to Ayckbourn, modern classics to timeless farces along with many plays presented for the first time in the Medway Towns and, indeed, Kent. Medway Little Theatre also has a thriving youth company and a children's workshop for younger people. Every summer the Duncan Rand One-Act Play Festival (named after one of Medway Little Theatre's founders) attracts groups from far and wide.

=== Media ===
Local newspapers for Rochester include the Medway Messenger, published by the KM Group, and free papers.

The local commercial radio station for Rochester is KMFM Medway, owned by the KM Group. Medway is also served by community radio station Radio Sunlight which is now an online service. The area also receives broadcasts from county-wide stations BBC Radio Kent, Heart, Gold and Smooth, as well as from various Essex and Greater London radio stations. Rochester is part of the ITV Meridian and BBC South East area, receiving television signals from the Bluebell Hill transmitter on the crest of the North Downs to the SE, supplemented by a low power relay transmitter in central Chatham.

=== Sport ===
Football is played with many teams competing in Saturday and Sunday leagues. The local football club is Rochester United. The original Rochester Football Club, founded in 1868, was one of the earliest association clubs, and once reached the final 10 of the FA Cup, but stopped playing in 1895. Rugby is also played; Medway RFC play their matches at Priestfields and Old Williamsonians is associated with Sir Joseph Williamson's Mathematical School.

Cricket is played in the town, with teams entered in the Kent Cricket League. Holcombe Hockey Club enter teams in both the Men's and Women's England Hockey Leagues. Speedway was staged on a track adjacent to City Way that opened in 1932. Proposals for a revival in the early 1970s did not materialise and the Rochester Bombers became the Romford Bombers.

Sailing and rowing are also popular on the River Medway with respective clubs being based in Rochester.

=== Film ===
The 1959 James Bond novel Goldfinger describes Bond driving along the A2 through the Medway Towns from Strood to Chatham. Of interest is the mention of "inevitable traffic jams" on the Strood side of Rochester Bridge, the novel being written some years prior to the construction of the M2 motorway Medway bypass.

Rochester is the setting of the controversial 1965 Peter Watkins television film The War Game, which depicts the town's destruction by a nuclear missile. The opening sequence was shot in Chatham Town Hall, but the credits particularly thank the people of Dover, Gravesend and Tonbridge.

A scene in the 2001 film Last Orders, starring Bob Hoskins and Tom Courtenay, was filmed in Rochester High Street.

The 2011 adventure film Ironclad is based upon the 1215 siege of Rochester Castle. There are however areas where the plot differs from accepted historical narrative.

=== Notable people ===
The historic city was for many years the favourite of Charles Dickens, who lived within the diocese at nearby Gads Hill Place, Higham, many of his novels being based on the area. Descriptions of the town appear in Pickwick Papers, Great Expectations and (lightly fictionalised as "Cloisterham") in The Mystery of Edwin Drood. Elements of two houses in Rochester, Satis House and Restoration House, are used for Miss Havisham's house in Great Expectations, Satis House.

A monk of Rochester, Edmund of Hadenham (fl. 1307) was an English chronicler.

The priest, botanist and geologist John Stevens Henslow (1796–1861) was born in Rochester.

The actress Dame Sybil Thorndike and her brother Russell were brought up in Minor Canon Row adjacent to the cathedral; the daughter of a canon of Rochester Cathedral, she was educated at Rochester Grammar School for Girls. A local doctors' practice, local dental practice and a hall at Rochester Grammar School are all named after her.

Sir Peter Buck was Admiral of the Medway in the 17th century; knighted in 1603 he and Bishop Barlow hosted King James, the Stuart royal family and the King of Denmark in 1606. A civil servant to The Royal Dockyard and Lord High Admiral, Buck lived at Eastgate House, Rochester.

Major-General Denis Redman, a World War II veteran, was born and raised in Rochester and later became a founder member of REME, head of his Corps and a Major-General in the British Army.

The model and actress Kelly Brook went to Delce Junior School in Rochester and later the Thomas Aveling School (formerly Warren Wood Girls School).

== Education ==
Medway council run a selective system of education, similar to other local authorities in Kent, but call their secondary modern schools secondary schools. Almost all secondary schools in Rochester have opted for academy status.

In 1701, Sir Joseph Williamson left a bequest to establish the Mathematical School, a boys' grammar school, also referred to either as Rochester Math or The Math School. Unlike earlier educational foundations, such as The King's School, it was not tied to a religious establishment, but was opened for practical instruction of boys in navigation and mathematics.

The University for the Creative Arts, formerly the Kent Institute of Art & Design, was located on the boundary of Rochester with Chatham.

== Transport ==
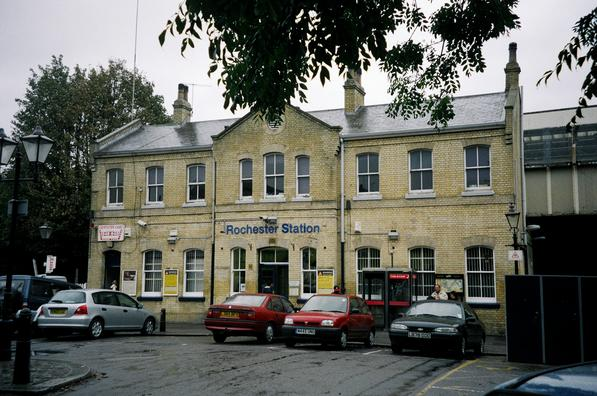
The old Rochester Station (overground): the rail tracks run along a viaduct.

Road

Rochester is on the A2, which crosses the Medway at Rochester Bridge – the route roughly follows the ancient road known as Watling Street, first paved by the Romans, but used by earlier Britons for centuries before the Roman invasion. Nowadays vehicular traffic is largely diverted onto the nearby M2 motorway. Watling Street passes through the town, and slightly to the south both the M2 motorway and the High Speed 1 railway line bridge the River Medway.

Bus

Bus services are operated by Arriva Southern Counties, which took over the locally owned Maidstone & District bus company in the 1990s. Other local bus companies including Nu-Venture provide certain services, some contracted from the local council.

Rail

Rochester railway station is on the Chatham Main Line and the North Kent Line. High speed services to St Pancras in London run via the North Kent Line with a junction east of Ebbsfleet International giving a journey time of slightly under 40 minutes. All railway services are provided by Southeastern.

Air

Rochester Airport began in September 1933 when Rochester City Council purchased some land as the site for a municipal airport. One month later the aircraft manufacturers Short Brothers leased the land for test flying. By 1934–5 Short Brothers had taken over the site, and moved in some of their personnel from the existing seaplane works. The inaugural flight into Rochester was from Gravesend, John Parker flying the Short Brothers Short Scion G-ACJI.

In 1979 the lease reverted to the City Council. After giving thorough consideration to closing the airport, GEC (then comprising Marconi and instrument makers Elliot Automation) decided to take over management of the airport. It maintained two grass landing strips while releasing some land for light industrial expansion.

== See also ==
- Rainham
- HM Prison Rochester
- Rochester and Strood (UK Parliament constituency)
- Earl of Rochester
