= Parliamentary constituencies in Kent =

The ceremonial county of Kent (which includes the unitary authority of Medway) is divided into 18 parliamentary constituencies: 2 borough constituencies and 16 county constituencies.

== Constituencies ==
Conservative † Labour ‡ Liberal Democrats ¤ Reform

Constituency (Note: BC denotes borough constituency, CC denotes county constituency.)	Electorate	Majority (Note: The majority is the number of votes the winning candidate receives more than their nearest rival.)	Member of Parliament	Nearest opposition	Map
Ashford CC	76,233	1,779	Sojan Joseph ‡	Damian Green †	
Canterbury CC	71,155	8,653	Rosie Duffield (re-elected as Labour)	Louise Harvey-Quirke †	
Chatham and Aylesford CC	75,109	1,998	Tris Osborne ‡	Nathan Gamester †	
Dartford CC	75,426	1,192	Jim Dickson ‡	Gareth Johnson †	
Dover and Deal CC	76,406	7,559	Mike Tapp ‡	Howard Cox ‡	
East Thanet BC	74,927	6,971	Polly Billington ‡	Helen Harrison †	
Faversham and Mid Kent CC	74,301	1,469	Helen Whately †	Mel Dawkins ‡	
Folkestone and Hythe CC	70,056	3,729	Tony Vaughan ‡	Damian Collins †	
Gillingham and Rainham BC	73,523	3,972	Naushabah Khan ‡	Rehman Chishti †	
Gravesham CC	73,094	2,712	Lauren Sullivan ‡	Adam Holloway †	
Herne Bay and Sandwich CC	77,869	2,499	Roger Gale †	Helen Whitehead ‡	
Maidstone and Malling CC	76,449	1,674	Helen Grant †	Maureen Cleator ‡	
Rochester and Strood CC	74,257	2,293	Lauren Edwards ‡	Kelly Tolhurst †	
Sevenoaks CC	73,708	5,440	Laura Trott †	Richard Streatfeild ¤	
Sittingbourne and Sheppey CC	79,067	355	Kevin McKenna ‡	Aisha Cuthbert †	
Tonbridge CC	72,799	11,166	Tom Tugendhat †	Lewis Bailey ‡	
Tunbridge Wells CC	78,738	8,687	Mike Martin ¤	Neil Mahapatra †	
Weald of Kent CC	75,987	8,422	Katie Lam †	Lenny Rolles ‡	

== Boundary changes ==
=== 2024 ===
See 2023 Periodic Review of Westminster constituencies for further details.

Former name
1. Ashford CC
2. Canterbury CC
3. Chatham and Aylesford CC
4. Dartford CC
5. Dover CC
6. Faversham and Mid Kent CC
7. Folkestone and Hythe CC
8. Gillingham and Rainham BC
9. Gravesham CC
10. Maidstone and The Weald CC
11. North Thanet CC
12. Rochester and Strood CC
13. Sevenoaks CC
14. Sittingbourne and Sheppey CC
15. South Thanet CC
16. Tonbridge and Malling CC
17. Tunbridge Wells CC
Boundaries 2010-2024

2010-2024 constituencies in Kent

Current name
1. Ashford CC
2. Canterbury CC
3. Chatham and Aylesford CC
4. Dartford CC
5. Dover and Deal CC
6. East Thanet CC
7. Faversham and Mid Kent CC
8. Folkestone and Hythe CC
9. Gillingham and Rainham BC
10. Gravesham CC
11. Herne Bay and Sandwich CC
12. Maidstone and Malling CC
13. Rochester and Strood CC
14. Sevenoaks CC
15. Sittingbourne and Sheppey CC
16. Tonbridge CC
17. Tunbridge Wells CC
18. Weald of Kent CC
Boundaries 2024–present

2024-present constituencies in Kent

For the 2023 Periodic Review of Westminster constituencies, which redrew the constituency map ahead of the 2024 United Kingdom general election, the Boundary Commission for England created an additional seat in Kent to reflect the growth of its electorate, with the formation of the constituency of Weald of Kent. As a consequence, Maidstone and the Weald, and Tonbridge and Malling were renamed Maidstone and Malling, and Tonbridge respectively. Changes to North Thanet and South Thanet resulted in them being renamed Herne Bay and Sandwich, and Thanet East respectively. Although only subject to a very minor boundary change, Dover reverted to its previous name of Dover and Deal.

The following constituencies resulted from the boundary review:

Containing electoral wards from Ashford

- Ashford (part)
- Weald of Kent (part)

Containing electoral wards from Canterbury

- Canterbury
- Herne Bay and Sandwich (part)

Containing electoral wards from Dartford

- Dartford
- Sevenoaks (part)

Containing electoral wards from Dover

- Dover and Deal
- Herne Bay and Sandwich (part)

Containing electoral wards from Folkestone and Hythe

- Ashford (part)
- Folkestone and Hythe

Containing electoral wards from Gravesham

- Gravesham

Containing electoral wards from Maidstone

- Faversham and Mid Kent (part)
- Maidstone and Malling (part)
- Weald of Kent (part)

Containing electoral wards from Medway

- Chatham and Aylesford (part)
- Gillingham and Rainham
- Rochester and Strood

Containing electoral wards from Sevenoaks

- Sevenoaks (part)
- Tonbridge (part)

Containing electoral wards from Swale

- Faversham and Mid Kent (part)
- Sittingbourne and Sheppey

Containing electoral wards from Thanet

- East Thanet
- Herne Bay and Sandwich (part)

Containing electoral wards from Tonbridge and Malling

- Chatham and Aylesford (part)
- Maidstone and Malling (part)
- Tonbridge (part)

Containing electoral wards from Tunbridge Wells

- Tunbridge Wells
- Weald of Kent (part)

=== 2010 ===
Under the Fifth Periodic Review of Westminster constituencies, the Boundary Commission for England decided to retain Kent's 17 constituencies for the 2010 election, making minor changes to realign constituency boundaries with the boundaries of current local government wards, and to reduce the electoral disparity between constituencies, including the transfer of Cliftonville from North Thanet to South Thanet. They recommended two name changes: Gillingham to Gillingham and Rainham to reflect the similar stature of the two towns, and Medway to Rochester and Strood to avoid confusion with the larger Medway unitary authority.

Name (1997–2010)
1. Ashford CC
2. Canterbury CC
3. Chatham and Aylesford CC
4. Dartford CC
5. Dover CC
6. Faversham and Mid Kent CC
7. Folkestone and Hythe CC
8. Gillingham BC
9. Gravesham CC
10. Maidstone and The Weald CC
11. Medway CC
12. North Thanet CC
13. Sevenoaks CC
14. Sittingbourne and Sheppey CC
15. South Thanet CC
16. Tonbridge and Malling CC
17. Tunbridge Wells CC
Boundaries 1997–2010

Parliamentary constituencies in Kent

Name (2010–2024)
1. Ashford CC
2. Canterbury CC
3. Chatham and Aylesford CC
4. Dartford CC
5. Dover CC
6. Faversham and Mid Kent CC
7. Folkestone and Hythe CC
8. Gillingham and Rainham BC
9. Gravesham CC
10. Maidstone and The Weald CC
11. North Thanet CC
12. Rochester and Strood CC
13. Sevenoaks CC
14. Sittingbourne and Sheppey CC
15. South Thanet CC
16. Tonbridge and Malling CC
17. Tunbridge Wells CC
Boundaries 2010–2024

Proposed Revised constituencies in Kent

=== 1997 ===
Under the Fourth Periodic Review of Westminster constituencies, the Boundary Commission for England opted to increase the number of constituencies in Kent from 16 to 17, reflecting the growth of the county's electorate. The "new" constituency, i.e. the constituency that did not contain a majority of any previous constituency's electorate, was Faversham & Mid Kent, which was formed from portions of the previous Maidstone, Faversham, Mid Kent and Canterbury constituencies. This had knock-on effects throughout the county, and resulted in the renaming of the former constituencies of Faversham and Mid Kent to Sittingbourne & Sheppey and Chatham & Aylesford, respectively.

Name (1983–1997)
1. Ashford CC
2. Canterbury CC
3. Dartford CC
4. Dover CC
5. Faversham CC
6. Folkestone and Hythe CC
7. Gillingham BC
8. Gravesham CC
9. Maidstone CC
10. Medway CC
11. Mid Kent CC
12. North Thanet CC
13. Sevenoaks CC
14. South Thanet CC
15. Tonbridge and Malling CC
16. Tunbridge Wells CC
Boundaries 1983–1997

Parliamentary constituencies in Kent (1983–1997)

Name (1997–2010)
1. Ashford CC
2. Canterbury CC
3. Chatham and Aylesford CC
4. Dartford CC
5. Dover CC
6. Faversham and Mid Kent CC
7. Folkestone and Hythe CC
8. Gillingham BC
9. Gravesham CC
10. Maidstone and The Weald CC
11. Medway CC
12. North Thanet CC
13. Sevenoaks CC
14. Sittingbourne and Sheppey CC
15. South Thanet CC
16. Tonbridge and Malling CC
17. Tunbridge Wells CC
Boundaries 1997–2010

Parliamentary constituencies in Kent (1997–2010)

=== 1983 ===
Under the Third Periodic Review of Westminster constituencies, the Boundary Commission for England opted to increase the number of constituencies in Kent from 15 to 16, reflecting the growth of the county's electorate. This resulted in the previously oversized Rochester and Chatham being split in half, with the city of Rochester becoming part of the new seat of Medway, along with the rural Hoo Peninsula (previously part of the Gravesend constituency) while town of Chatham became part of the new seat of Mid Kent, along with the northern portion of Maidstone. Thanet East (renamed North Thanet) and Thanet West (renamed South Thanet) gained parts of Canterbury and Dover and Deal (renamed Dover) respectively. Small transfer from Sevenoaks to Dartford to make their electorates more equal and minor or no changes to Ashford, Faversham, Folkestone and Hythe, Gillingham, Tonbridge and Malling, and Tunbridge Wells.

Name (1974–1983)
1. Ashford CC
2. Canterbury CC
3. Dartford CC
4. Dover and Deal CC
5. Faversham CC
6. Folkestone and Hythe CC
7. Gillingham BC
8. Gravesham CC
9. Maidstone CC
10. Rochester and Chatham CC
11. North Thanet CC
12. Sevenoaks CC
13. Thanet West CC
14. Tonbridge and Malling CC
15. Tunbridge Wells CC
Boundaries 1974–1983

Parliamentary constituencies in Kent (1974–1983)

Name (1983–1997)
1. Ashford CC
2. Canterbury CC
3. Dartford CC
4. Dover CC
5. Faversham CC
6. Folkestone and Hythe CC
7. Gillingham BC
8. Gravesham CC
9. Maidstone CC
10. Medway CC
11. Mid Kent CC
12. North Thanet CC
13. Sevenoaks CC
14. South Thanet CC
15. Tonbridge and Malling CC
16. Tunbridge Wells CC
Boundaries 1983–1997

Parliamentary constituencies in Kent (1983–1997)

== Results history ==
Primary data source: House of Commons research briefing - General election results from 1918 to 2019

=== 2024 ===
The number of votes cast for each political party who fielded candidates in constituencies comprising Kent in the 2019 general election were as follows:

Party	Votes	%	Change from 2019	Seats	Change from 2019
Conservative	251,860	31.3%	▼28.8%	6	▼10
Labour	249,043	31.0%	▲6.0%	11	▲10
Reform	168,652	21.0%	▲21.0%	0	0
Greens	64,303	8.0%	▲4.8%	0	0
Liberal Democrats	57,579	7.0%	▼3.4%	1	▲1
Others	13,059	1.6%	▲0.3%	0	0
Total	804,496	100.0		18	▲1

=== Percentage votes ===
Election year	1974 (Feb)	1974 (Oct)	1979	1983	1987	1992	1997	2001	2005	2010	2015	2017	2019	2024
Conservative	44.2	44.0	53.9	53.9	54.0	53.1	40.5	43.4	45.8	50.5	49.2	56.4	60.1	31.3
Labour	29.5	33.3	29.9	18.6	19.3	24.3	37.1	37.7	32.4	21.1	20.0	31.7	25.0	31.0
Reform^{1}	-	-	-	-	-	-	-	-	-	-	-	-	-	21.0
Green Party	-	-	-	-	*	*	*	*	*	1.0	3.6	2.2	3.2	8.0
Liberal Democrat^{2}	25.7	21.8	15.1	26.9	26.1	21.3	17.0	15.5	17.3	20.9	6.3	5.5	10.4	7.0
UKIP	-	-	-	-	-	-	*	*	*	3.9	20.3	3.6	*	*
Other	0.6	0.9	1.1	0.7	0.6	1.3	5.4	3.4	4.4	2.6	0.5	0.6	1.3	1.6

^{1}2019 - Brexit Party
^{2}1974 & 1979 - Liberal Party; 1983 & 1987 - SDP–Liberal Alliance

* Included in Other

=== Seats ===
Election year	1974 (Feb)	1974 (Oct)	1979	1983	1987	1992	1997	2001	2005	2010	2015	2017	2019	2024
Labour	2	3	0	0	0	0	8	8	7	0	0	1	1	11
Conservative	13	12	15	16	16	16	9	9	10	17	17	16	16	6
Liberal Democrats	0	0	0	0	0	0	0	0	0	0	0	0	0	1
Total	15	15	15	16	16	16	17	17	17	17	17	17	17	18

=== Maps ===
==== 1885-1910 ====
1885

1886

1892

1895

1900

1906

Jan 1910

Dec 1910

==== 1918-1945 ====
1918

1922

1923

1924

1929

1931

1935

1945

==== 1950-1970 ====
1950

1951

1955

1959

1964

1966

1970

==== 1974-present ====
Feb 1974

Oct 1974

1979

1983

1987

1992

1997

2001

2005

2010

2015

2017

2019

2024

== Historic representation by party ==
A cell marked → (with a different colour background to the preceding cell) indicates that the previous MP continued to sit under a new party name.

=== 1885 to 1918 ===
Conservative Independent Conservative Independent Liberal Labour Liberal Liberal Unionist National Party

Constituency	1885	1886	88	89	1892	93	1895	98	99	1900	01	03	04	1906	Jan 1910	Dec 1910	11	12	13	15	17	18
Ashford	Pomfret				Hardy																	
Canterbury	Heaton															Bennett-Goldney						Anderson
Chatham	Gorst				Loyd		Davies							Jenkins	Hohler							
Dartford	Dyke													Rowlands	Mitchell	Rowlands						
Dover	Dickson			Wyndham															Ponsonby		→	
Faversham	Knatchbull-Hugessen						Barnes			Howard				Napier	Wheler							
Gravesend	White				Palmer			Ryder		Parker												Richardson
Hythe	Watkin	→					Edwards		E. Sassoon									P. Sassoon				
Isle of Thanet	King-Harman		Lowther										Marks		Craig							
Maidstone	Ross		Cornwallis				Hunt	Cornwallis		Barker	Evans			Vane-Tempest-Stewart						Bellairs		
Medway	Gathorne-Hardy				Warde																	
Rochester	Hughes-Hallett			Knatchbull-Hugessen	Davies	Gascoyne-Cecil						Tuff		Lamb	Ridley	Lamb						
St Augustine's	Akers-Douglas																McNeill					
Sevenoaks	Mills				Forster																	
Tunbridge	Norton				Griffith-Boscawen									Hedges	Spender-Clay							

=== 1918 to 1950 ===
Coalition Liberal (1918-22) / National Liberal (1922-23) Conservative Constitutionalist Independent Labour Liberal National Labour

Constituency	1918	19	20	21	1922	23	1923	1924	27	28	1929	30	31	1931	33	35	1935	37	38	39	43	1945	45	46	47
Bexley																						Adamson		Bramall	
Orpington																						Smithers			
Ashford	Steel										Kedward			Knatchbull	Spens						Smith				
Bromley	Forster	James										Campbell											Macmillan		
Canterbury	McNeill								Wayland													White			
Chatham	Moore-Brabazon										Markham		→	Goff			Plugge					Bottomley			
Chislehurst	A. Smithers				Nesbitt			W. Smithers														Wallace			
Dartford	Rowlands		Mills		Jarrett	→	Mills	McDonnell			Mills			Clarke					Adamson			Dodds			
Dover	Ponsonby			Polson	Astor																	Thomas			
Faversham	Wheler									Maitland												Wells			
Gillingham	Hohler										Gower											Binns			
Gravesend	Richardson						Isaacs	Albery														Allighan			Acland
Hythe	P. Sassoon																			Brabner		Mackeson			
Isle of Thanet	Craig	Harmsworth									Balfour											Carson			
Maidstone	Bellairs													Bossom											
Sevenoaks	Bennett						Williams	Styles			Young					Ponsonby									
Tonbridge	Spender-Clay																	Baillie				Williams			

=== 1950 to 1974 ===
Conservative Labour Liberal

Constituency	1950	1951	53	55	1955	56	57	1959	62	64	1964	1966	1970	
Ashford	Deedes													
Beckenham	Buchan-Hepburn						Goodhart							Transferred to Greater London
Bexley	Heath													Transferred to Greater London
Bromley	Macmillan										Hunt			Transferred to Greater London
Canterbury	White		Thomas									Crouch		
Chislehurst	Hornsby-Smith											Macdonald	Hornsby-Smith	Transferred to Greater London
Dartford	Dodds				Irving								Trew	
Dover	Arbuthnot										Ennals		Rees	
Erith and Crayford					Dodds									Transferred to Greater London
Faversham	Wells									Boston			Moate	
Folkestone and Hythe	Mackeson							Costain						
Gillingham	Burden													
Gravesend	Acland				Kirk						Murray		White	
Isle of Thanet	Carson		Rees-Davies											
Maidstone	Bossom							Wells						
Orpington	Smithers			Sumner					Lubbock				Stanbrook	Transferred to Greater London
Rochester and Chatham	Bottomley							Critchley			Kerr		Fenner	
Sevenoaks	Rodgers													
Tonbridge	Williams					Hornby								

=== 1974 to 2010 ===
Conservative Independent Labour

Constituency	Feb 1974	Oct 1974	1979	1983	1987	1992	1997	2001	2005
Ashford	Deedes	Speed					Green		
Canterbury	D. Crouch				Brazier				
Dartford	Irving		Dunn				Stoate		
Dover & Deal / Dover (1983–)	Rees				Shaw		Prosser		
Faversham / Sittingbourne & Sheppey (1997)	Moate						Wyatt		
Folkestone and Hythe	Costain			Howard					
Gillingham	Burden			Couchman			P. Clark		
Gravesend / Gravesham (1983)	Ovenden		Brinton		Arnold		Pond		Holloway
Maidstone / Maidstone & The Weald (1997)	Wells				Widdecombe				
Rochester & Chatham / Medway (1983)	Fenner	Bean	Fenner				Marshall-Andrews		
Sevenoaks	Rodgers		Wolfson				Fallon		
Thanet W / North Thanet (1983)	Rees-Davies			Gale					
Tonbridge & Malling	Hornby	Stanley							
Thanet East / South Thanet (1983)	Aitken						Ladyman		
Tunbridge Wells	Mayhew						Norman		G. Clark
Mid Kent / Faversham & Mid Kent (1997)				Rowe				Robertson	
Chatham and Aylesford							Shaw		

=== 2010 to present ===
Conservative Independent Labour Liberal Democrats UKIP

Constituency	2010	14	2015	2017	17	18	19	2019	24	2024	24
Ashford	Green									Joseph	
Canterbury	Brazier			Duffield							→
Chatham and Aylesford	T. Crouch									Osborne	
Dartford	Johnson									Dickson	
Dover / Dover and Deal (2024)	C. Elphicke				→	→	→	N. Elphicke	→	Tapp	
Faversham & Mid Kent	Robertson		Whately								
Folkestone and Hythe	Collins									Vaughan	
Gillingham & Rainham	Chishti									Khan	
Gravesham	Holloway									Sullivan	
Maidstone & The Weald / M'stone & Malling ('24)	Grant										
North Thanet / Herne Bay & Sandwich (2024)	Gale										
Rochester & Strood	Reckless	→	Tolhurst							Edwards	
Sevenoaks	Fallon							Trott			
Sittingbourne and Sheppey	Henderson									McKenna	
South Thanet / East Thanet (2024)	Sandys		Mackinlay							Billington	
Tonbridge & Malling / Tonbridge (2024)	Stanley			Tugendhat							
Tunbridge Wells	G. Clark (Note: Clark had the Conservative whip suspended from 3 September to 29 October 2019, during which time he sat as an independent.)									Martin	
Weald of Kent										Lam	

== See also ==
- Parliamentary constituencies in South East England
