= Third periodic review of Westminster constituencies =

1976–83 review of UK electoral boundaries

The third periodic review of Westminster constituencies was undertaken in the United Kingdom between 1976 and 1983 by the four boundary commissions. The reviews took account of the major local government reorganisations that had become effective in 1974, and resulted in significant changes to the electoral map. The previous 635 seats were replaced with 650 constituencies, of which 90% were newly created or significantly revised. The new boundaries were first used for the 1983 general election.

== Review process ==
Under the terms of the House of Commons (Redistribution of Seats) Act 1958, the boundary commissions were required to present their final recommendations between 10 and 15 years after the submission of their previous reports. As the final reports for the second periodic review had been submitted between April and June 1969, the final reports for the Third Review were due to be submitted no later than June 1984. Accordingly, the English Commission had commenced their review in March 1976, anticipating that its review would take three years and would be complicated by the level of change to the local government boundaries. In the event, the review took over six years, mainly as a result of delays to the work of the Local Government Boundary Commission for England. The Scottish and Welsh commissions commenced their reviews in February 1978 and February 1981 respectively, again experiencing problems with delays to local government boundary reviews. The process in Northern Ireland was delayed pending consideration of the province's representation by a Speaker's Conference. This resulted in an increase from 12 to 17 seats, as enacted by the House of Commons (Redistribution of Seats) Act 1979.

The final reports were submitted as follows:

- Northern Ireland - 27 October 1982
- Wales - 21 January 1983
- England - 1 February 1983
- Scotland - 18 February 1983

== Changes ==
=== England ===
As a result of the creation of six metropolitan counties and three new non-metropolitan counties (Avon, Cleveland and Humberside - all now abolished), many existing constituencies now crossed county boundaries, with some lying in three or even four counties (e.g. Goole, formerly in the West Riding of Yorkshire, included parts in Humberside, North Yorkshire, South Yorkshire and West Yorkshire; and Newton, formerly in Lancashire, straddled Greater Manchester, Merseyside and a reconfigured Cheshire). Given the ancient tradition that constituency boundaries ought not to cross county boundaries, the configuration of the constituencies was, consequently, radically changed – particularly in the North of England. Although there was a redistribution of the number of seats in London, the South and the Midlands, the overall disruption to the existing layout was more limited as these areas were less affected by the local government reorganisation.

The Review abolished many long-established constituencies, such as Abingdon, Bedford^{1}, Clitheroe, Colchester^{1}, Eye, Hastings, Kidderminster, Morpeth, Oxford, Paisley, Petersfield, Ripon, Rye, Totnes^{1} and Warrington, which had all been in existence since at least 1832.

^{1} These were re-established at subsequent reviews.

The summary of changes below highlights newly created constituencies in bold and abolished ones in italic. Continuing seats are in plain text.

Overall, the English Commission increased the number of seats by seven, from 516 to 523.

==== East Midlands (42 seats) ====
Number of seats increased by three.

===== Derbyshire (10) =====
Belper, Ilkeston and South East Derbyshire abolished and succeeded by South Derbyshire, Amber Valley and Erewash respectively. Remaining 7 constituencies retained with moderate changes (High Peak, West Derbyshire, North East Derbyshire, Chesterfield, Bolsover, Derby North and Derby South).

===== Leicestershire (9) =====
North West Leicestershire created, comprising over half of Loughborough and a substantial part of Bosworth. To compensate, these two constituencies gained parts of the abolished seat of Melton, the majority of which was combined with the former county of Rutland to form Rutland and Melton. Blaby, Harborough, Leicester East, Leicester South and Leicester West were unchanged.

===== Lincolnshire (6) =====
Changes to the county boundary and the absorption of the county of Rutland by Leicestershire lead to significant changes. Gainsborough, Horncastle, and Rutland and Stamford were abolished and replaced respectively with Gainsborough and Horncastle, East Lindsey, and Stamford and Spalding. Grantham and Holland with Boston both lost parts of their electorates, whilst Lincoln was expanded.

===== Northamptonshire (6) =====
Corby created from substantial areas of Kettering and Wellingborough. Parts of the new town of Northampton in Daventry transferred to both Northampton North and Northampton South.

===== Nottinghamshire (11) =====
Sherwood created from parts of Newark and Ashfield, resulting in major changes to these two continuing seats. Knock-on impacts also resulted in reduced electorates for Bassetlaw, Mansfield, Beeston (renamed Broxtowe), Carlton (renamed Gedling) and Rushcliffe. In the city of Nottingham, significant changes were made to Nottingham East and Nottingham North, with Nottingham South replacing Nottingham West.

==== Eastern (51 seats) ====
Number of seats increased by six.

===== Bedfordshire (5) =====
Although the number of seats was unchanged and boundary changes were moderate, only Mid Bedfordshire was retained as a constituency name. Bedford, South Bedfordshire, Luton East and Luton West were abolished and succeeded by North Bedfordshire, South West Bedfordshire, Luton South and North Luton respectively.

===== Cambridgeshire (6) =====
Cambridgeshire was split into South East Cambridgeshire and South West Cambridgeshire, with the latter including a substantial part of Huntingdonshire - now formally named Huntingdon. Modest changes to Cambridge, Peterborough and Isle of Ely, which was renamed North East Cambridgeshire.

===== Essex (16) =====
Two additional constituencies: Billericay comprised a significant part of Basildon, together with areas transferred from Thurrock; and Rochford was formed primarily from the abolished constituency of Maldon, together with parts of Chelmsford and South East Essex (consequently renamed Castle Point). Remaining parts of Maldon, combined with southern areas of the abolished constituency of Colchester, formed South Colchester and Maldon, and northern parts of Colchester formed North Colchester which also included areas transferred from Harwich. Other minor changes affected Harlow, Brentwood and Ongar, Chelmsford and Braintree. Epping Forest, Saffron Walden, Southend East and Southend West were unchanged.

===== Hertfordshire (10) =====
East Hertfordshire was divided between the two new constituencies of Broxbourne, and Hertford and Stortford, with the town of Hertford being transferred to the latter from Hertford and Stevenage, the bulk of which formed the new seat of Stevenage. Varying degrees of change to the three retained seats of South West Hertfordshire, St Albans and Watford and four with changed names - Hitchin to North Hertfordshire; Welwyn and Hatfield to Welwyn Hatfield; Hemel Hempstead to West Hertfordshire; and South Hertfordshire to Hertsmere.

===== Norfolk (8) =====
Mid Norfolk created from parts of North Norfolk, South West Norfolk and Yarmouth (now officially named Great Yarmouth). The knock-on impacts resulted in significant changes to the other retained seats of North West Norfolk, South Norfolk, Norwich North and Norwich South.

===== Suffolk (6) =====
Three new seats of Central Suffolk, South Suffolk and Suffolk Coastal were created as a result of the abolition of Eye and Sudbury and Woodbridge and substantial reductions in the electorates of Bury St Edmunds and Ipswich. Lowestoft was renamed Waveney with only minor changes.

==== London (84 seats) ====
Number of seats reduced by eight.

The Commission continued to consider each London Borough separately. Consequently, the following eight boroughs each lost one seat:

- Camden - Hampstead gained the Highgate ward and was renamed **Hampstead and Highgate**. The remainder of St Pancras North was combined with Holborn and St Pancras South to form **Holborn and St Pancras**.
- Hackney - Hackney Central abolished and absorbed into Hackney North and Stoke Newington and Hackney South and Shoreditch.
- Haringey - The majority of Wood Green was combined with the bulk of Hornsey to form **Hornsey and Wood Green**. Remaining parts of both abolished constituencies were transferred to Tottenham.
- Harrow - Harrow Central abolished and absorbed into Harrow East and Harrow West.
- Islington - Islington Central abolished and absorbed into Islington North and Islington South and Finsbury. One ward transferred from the former to the latter.
- Lambeth - Lambeth Central abolished, with majority being added to Vauxhall and remainder split between Streatham and Norwood.
- Wandsworth - Battersea North and Battersea South abolished. All of the former and majority of the latter formed **Battersea**, with remainder of the latter being transferred to Tooting. Putney unchanged.
- Westminster - Paddington and St Marylebone abolished, with small parts of both constituencies being transferred to The City of London and Westminster South. Remaining areas of both seats combined to form **Westminster North**.

In Tower Hamlets the boundary between the two seats was realigned, with Bethnal Green and Stepney and Bow and Poplar replacing Bethnal Green and Bow and Stepney and Poplar.

Elsewhere, there were minor changes to make the size of the electorates more equal in 11 boroughs, resulting in four seats being renamed: Richmond (Surrey) to Richmond and Barnes; Bermondsey to Southwark and Bermondsey; Woolwich East to Woolwich; and Woolwich West to Eltham. There were also three name changes which did not involve any boundary changes: Sidcup to Old Bexley and Sidcup; Carshalton to Carshalton and Wallington; and Hammersmith North to Hammersmith.

==== North East (30 seats) ====
Number of seats reduced by one.

===== Cleveland (6) =====
Stockton, Thornaby and Cleveland and Whitby were succeeded by Stockton North, Stockton South and Langbaurgh respectively, albeit with major changes to all three, resulting in a significant knock-on impact to the continuing seat of Middlesbrough. Hartlepool and Redcar were largely unchanged.

===== Durham (7) =====
Chester-le-Street was abolished, with the majority of the seat being included in the new constituency of North Durham and parts in Blaydon, and Houghton and Washington in Tyne and Wear. Consett was also abolished, with its contents being divided between North Durham and a much altered North West Durham. Sedgefield was re-established, taking parts from the four continuing constituencies of North West Durham, City of Durham, Easington and Bishop Auckland. Darlington was unchanged.

===== Northumberland (4) =====
Wansbeck was re-established (albeit with significantly different boundaries to previous versions), largely replacing Morpeth. An altered Blyth constituency was renamed Blyth Valley. Berwick-upon-Tweed (expanded) and Hexham (reduced in size) were retained.

===== Tyne and Wear (13) =====
A new constituency spanning the River Tyne, named Tyne Bridge, was created from parts of six existing seats, including the majority of Gateshead West (abolished) and Newcastle upon Tyne Central. The existing seat of Newcastle upon Tyne North now effectively became a completely reconfigured Newcastle upon Tyne Central, and a new version of Newcastle upon Tyne North (with no parts in common with the old version) largely replaced the abolished constituency of Newcastle upon Tyne West. Houghton-le-Spring was succeeded by Houghton and Washington. Tynemouth, Wallsend, Blaydon, Gateshead East, Jarrow, South Shields, Sunderland North and Sunderland South were all retained with varying degrees of change.

==== North West (79 seats) ====
Number of seats reduced by three.

===== Cheshire (10) =====
Only City of Chester and Macclesfield were retained, both being reduced in size. Bebington and Ellesmere Port (part), Northwich, Nantwich, Crewe, Knutsford, Runcorn, Widnes (part), Warrington and Newton (part) were replaced with Ellesmere Port and Neston, Eddisbury, Crewe and Nantwich, Congleton, Tatton, Halton, Warrington South and Warrington North.

===== Cumbria (6) =====
Barrow-in-Furness (formally renamed Barrow and Furness) and Westmorland (renamed Westmorland and Lonsdale) gained parts of the abolished constituency of Morecambe and Lonsdale (see Lancashire). No changes to Carlisle, Whitehaven (renamed Copeland) and Workington, while Penrith and The Border gained a small part of Westmorland.

===== Greater Manchester (30) =====
The creation of the new metropolitan county resulted in significant changes throughout the area, with very few constituencies bearing a close resemblance to the existing configuration of seats.

In the east of the county, Rochdale, Ashton-under-Lyne, and Stalybridge and Hyde were retained with only minor changes. Bury and Radcliffe, Middleton and Prestwich, Heywood and Royton, and Oldham East were abolished and were replaced by Bury North, Bury South, Heywood and Middleton, Oldham Central and Royton, and Littleborough and Saddleworth (Saddleworth was transferred from the Colne Valley seat in West Yorkshire).

In the city of Manchester, Manchester Blackley and Manchester Withington were each expanded by one ward, and Manchester Wythenshawe was virtually unchanged. Manchester Openshaw was abolished, with Failsworth being transferred to Oldham West and the remainder to a much expanded Manchester Central. Manchester Ardwick was absorbed into the substantially reconfigured seat of Manchester Gorton, with Denton now comprising the majority of the new seat of Denton and Reddish (Reddish had been part of Stockport North). The majority of both Stockport North and Stockport South were combined to form Stockport. Cheadle and Hazel Grove were retained, subject to moderate adjustments, with part of the former being included in the new constituency of Tatton in Cheshire. The largest part of the abolished constituency of Manchester Moss Side was transferred to Stretford, while Altrincham and Sale gained parts of the abolished constituency of Knutsford in Cheshire; to compensate, parts of these two continuing constituencieswere combined to form the new seat of Davyhulme.

In the west of the county, Bolton West, Wigan and Leigh were retained, albeit with significant changes. Bolton East, Farnworth, Westhoughton and parts of the former seats of Ince and Newton (see Cheshire) were replaced with Bolton North East, Bolton South East, Makerfield and Worsley. The majority of Salford West was absorbed into Salford East, with a small area being added to Eccles.

===== Lancashire (16) =====
Only 6 constituencies in the radically reconfigured county of Lancashire were retained under their current names: Blackpool North, Blackpool South (both unchanged), Lancaster, Burnley, Blackburn and Chorley.

Morecambe and Lonsdale was abolished as "Lonsdale" was now part of the new county of Cumbria and its contents were now included in the constituencies of Barrow and Furness, and Westmorland and Lonsdale. Remaining areas formed the new seat of Morecambe and Lunesdale, together with a small area transferred from Lancaster. To compensate, Lancaster gained a small part of North Fylde, with the remainder of that constituency forming Wyre.

Nelson and Colne (renamed Pendle), Burnley, Accrington (renamed Hyndburn) and Blackburn were expanded, whilst South Fylde (renamed Fylde) and Chorley were reduced in size. Preston North, Preston South, Clitheroe, Darwen and Rossendale were abolished, and new seats Preston, Ribble Valley, South Ribble, and Rossendale and Darwen created. West Lancashire was formed from parts of the abolished constituencies of Ormskirk and Ince (see Greater Manchester).

===== Merseyside (17) =====
Southport was unchanged, with relatively small changes to Crosby and Bootle. Huyton and St Helens and parts of the former seats of Ormskirk (see Lancashire), Newton and Widnes (see Cheshire) were replaced with Knowsley North, Knowsley South, St Helens North and St Helens South.

In the city of Liverpool, there was an overall reduction of two seats, with the abolition of Liverpool Kirkdale and Liverpool Scotland Exchange. Liverpool Garston, Liverpool Walton and Liverpool West Derby were retained, whilst Liverpool Edge Hill, Liverpool Toxteth and Liverpool Wavertree were succeeded respectively by Liverpool Mossley Hill, Liverpool Riverside and Liverpool Broadgreen, all with revised boundaries of varying degrees.

In the Wirral, Wallasey was unchanged. Bebington and Ellesmere Port was abolished with about half the electorate forming the bulk of the new seat of Wirral South (the other half comprising the majority the new seat of Ellesmere Port and Neston in Cheshire). Wirral (renamed Wirral West) was reduced in size through transfers to Birkenhead, Ellesmere Port and Neston, and Wirral South.

==== South East (77 seats) ====
Number of seats increased by seven.

===== Berkshire (7) =====
The two Reading seats were abolished following the transfer of parts of Reading North to Reading South to form Reading West and Reading East respectively. To compensate, parts of Newbury were transferred to Reading West and parts of Reading East were now included in Wokingham. The majority of the existing seat of Wokingham formed the new seat of East Berkshire which also included parts of Windsor and Maidenhead. Eton and Slough was renamed Slough following the inclusion of the village of Eton in Windsor and Maidenhead.

===== Buckinghamshire (6) =====
The new seat of Milton Keynes was carved out of Buckingham. There were further changes of varying degrees to Buckingham and the other four seats of Aylesbury, Beaconsfield, Chesham and Amersham, and Wycombe.

===== East Sussex (8) =====
The small town of Rye was transferred from Rye to Hastings resulting in these seats being renamed Bexhill and Battle and Hastings and Rye respectively. Similarly, the town of East Grinstead was transferred to Mid Sussex (see West Sussex), so the constituency of East Grinstead was renamed Wealden, which included a part of Lewes. There was small changes to Brighton Kemptown, Brighton Pavilion, Eastbourne and Hove.

===== Hampshire (15) =====
Aldershot, Basingstoke, Eastleigh, Fareham, Gosport, Havant (renamed Havant and Waterloo), Portsmouth North, Portsmouth South, Southampton Itchen, Southampton Test and Winchester were all retained with varying degrees of change. North West Hampshire comprised about half the electorate of Winchester and part of Basingstoke. Petersfield was abolished, with parts being transferred to Winchester and Fareham, and the majority forming the basis of the new seat of East Hampshire, which also included parts of Aldershot and Basingstoke.

Christchurch and Lymington was abolished, with the town of Christchurch forming the basis of a new constituency of that name in Dorset. Lymington was included in a radically reconfigured New Forest seat, the majority of which formed the basis of the new seat of Romsey and Waterside - with Romsey being transferred from Eastleigh.

===== Isle of Wight (1) =====
No change.

===== Kent (16) =====
Rochester and Chatham was split between the new seats of Medway and Mid Kent, with the former including parts of Gravesend (renamed Gravesham) and the latter parts of Maidstone. Thanet East (renamed North Thanet) and Thanet West (renamed South Thanet) gained parts of Canterbury and Dover and Deal (renamed Dover) respectively. Small transfer from Sevenoaks to Dartford to make their electorates more equal and minor or no changes to Ashford, Faversham, Folkestone and Hythe, Gillingham, Tonbridge and Malling, and Tunbridge Wells.

===== Oxfordshire (6) =====
The majority of the abolished constituency of Abingdon formed the new seat of Wantage, and the majority of Oxford formed Oxford East. Remaining parts of Abingdon and Oxford were combined to form Oxford West and Abingdon. There were moderate changes to Banbury and Mid Oxon (renamed Witney) and small changes to Henley.

===== Surrey (11) =====
Moderate changes involving Dorking (renamed Mole Valley), Epsom and Ewell, Esher and Reigate. Minor or no changes to Chertsey and Walton, East Surrey, Farnham (renamed South West Surrey), Guildford, North West Surrey, Spelthorne and Woking.

===== West Sussex (7) =====
Horsham and Crawley was split into the two separate constituencies of Horsham and Crawley, with the former including parts of Shoreham and the latter parts of Mid Sussex. To compensate, parts of Arundel and the abolished seat of East Grinstead (see East Sussex) were transferred to Shoreham and Mid Sussex respectively. Chichester and Worthing were unchanged.

==== South West (48 seats) ====
Number of seats increased by two.

===== Avon (10) =====
South Gloucestershire abolished, with part being added to Bristol North West and remainder forming the new seat of Northavon. Most of the abolished constituencies of Bristol North East and Bristol South East were either included in the new seat of Bristol East or transferred to a reconfigured Kingswood. Other changes in the Bristol area resulted in the expansion of Bristol South and Bristol West. North Somerset abolished and split between the new constituencies of Wansdyke and Woodspring, with the former including parts of Kingswood and the latter parts of Weston-super-Mare, which also transferred parts to the reconfigured constituency of Wells in Somerset. Bath was unchanged.

===== Cornwall (5) =====
Changes of varying degrees to Bodmin (renamed South East Cornwall), Falmouth and Camborne, North Cornwall, St Ives and Truro.

===== Devon (11) =====
South Hams was created from parts of Totnes (renamed Teignbridge), West Devon (renamed Torridge and West Devon) and Torbay. To compensate the first two of these, parts respectively of Tiverton and North Devon were transferred in. In turn, a small part of Honiton was transferred to Tiverton. A realignment of the boundary between Plymouth Devonport and Plymouth Drake resulted in major changes to both seats. There were minor changes to Plymouth Sutton and no change to Exeter.

===== Dorset (7) =====
The majority of the new seat of Christchurch was formed from about half the abolished seat of Christchurch and Lymington (see Hampshire) and also included a substantial transfer from North Dorset. Bournemouth East and Bournemouth West expanded at the expense of Poole. Minor changes affecting South Dorset and West Dorset.

===== Gloucestershire (5) =====
Transfers from Cirencester and Tewkesbury to Cheltenham, and from Stroud to Gloucester to make the electorates more equal. West Gloucestershire was unchanged.

===== Somerset (5) =====
The majority of the continuing seat of Wells formed the basis of the new constituency of Somerton and Frome, which also included part of Yeovil. To compensate Wells, parts of Weston-super-Mare (see Avon) and Bridgwater were transferred in. Taunton was unchanged.

===== Wiltshire (5) =====
Although there were no changes to Chippenham, it was renamed North Wiltshire. Minor changes to Devizes, Salisbury, Swindon and Westbury.

==== West Midlands (58 seats) ====
Number of seats increased by two.

===== Hereford and Worcester (7) =====
Bromsgrove and Redditch split between the new seats of Bromsgrove and Mid Worcestershire, with the latter including the town of Redditch and substantial parts transferred from Worcester. Parts of Kidderminster (renamed Wyre Forest) were transferred to Leominster and a small area from South Worcestershire to Worcester to make the electorates more equal. Hereford was virtually unchanged.

===== Shropshire (4) =====
There were transfers from The Wrekin to Ludlow and Oswestry (renamed North Shropshire) to make the electorates more equal. Shrewsbury was unchanged but renamed Shrewsbury and Atcham.

===== Staffordshire (11) =====
The majority of Lichfield and Tamworth formed South East Staffordshire, with parts also being included in the new seats of Cannock and Burntwood (formed primarily from the abolished constituency of Cannock), and Mid Staffordshire (also comprising parts of Cannock and Stafford and Stone - renamed Stafford). Stoke-on-Trent North gained part of Leek (renamed Staffordshire Moorlands). Small changes affecting Stoke-on-Trent Central, Stoke-on-Trent South and Newcastle-under-Lyme. Burton and South West Staffordshire were unchanged, with the latter renamed South Staffordshire.

===== Warwickshire (5) =====
The majority of North Warwickshire was formed from a substantial part of Meriden (see West Midlands) and also included the town of Bedworth, transferred from Nuneaton. The town of Kenilworth was transferred from Warwick and Leamington to Rugby, resulting in the latter being renamed Rugby and Kenilworth. There was a minor change to Stratford-on-Avon.

===== West Midlands (31) =====
A substantial part of Meriden formed the majority of the new constituency of North Warwickshire (see Warwickshire), with part of Solihull transferred in to compensate. Birmingham Handsworth was abolished, with most of the electorate being transferred to Birmingham Ladywood and Birmingham Perry Barr. Birmingham Stechford was renamed Birmingham Hodge Hill with only minor changes.

Elsewhere in the new metropolitan county, there were small changes to 16 constituencies and no changes to a further ten.

==== Yorkshire and the Humber (54 seats) ====
Number of seats reduced by one.

===== Humberside (9) =====
Having gained parts of Kingston-upon-Hull East and lost parts to Kingston-upon-Hull West, Kingston-upon-Hull Central was renamed Kingston-upon-Hull North. Small changes to Bridlington and Haltemprice (renamed Beverley). Boothferry was created from parts of the abolished constituencies of Howden, Goole (see South Yorkshire) and Gainsborough (see Lincolnshire). Parts of Brigg and Scunthorpe (renamed Glanford and Scunthorpe), including the town of Brigg, were transferred to the new seat of Brigg and Cleethorpes, which also included the majority of the abolished seat of Louth (the town of Louth itself was included in the new seat of East Lindsey in Lincolnshire). Grimsby was unchanged and formally renamed Great Grimsby.

===== North Yorkshire (7) =====
Scarborough gained the town of Whitby from the abolished constituency of Cleveland and Whitby (see Cleveland). Having transferred the town of Thirsk to Richmond (Yorks), Thirsk and Malton was renamed Ryedale. Skipton lost western areas to various seats in the North West region and gained the town of Ripon from the abolished constituency of Ripon (see West Yorkshire) and was therefore renamed Skipton and Ripon. Selby was primarily formed from parts of the abolished constituencies of Barkston Ash (see West Yorkshire) and Howden (see Humberside). Minor changes to Harrogate and no change to York.

===== South Yorkshire (15) =====
Goole was abolished with parts being included in Boothferry (see Humberside), Pontefract and Castleford (see West Yorkshire) and Doncaster North, the majority of which was formed from substantial parts of Don Valley - which also transferred a smaller part to Doncaster (renamed Doncaster Central). The majority of Wentworth was carved out of Rother Valley and the majority of Barnsley East was transferred from Hemsworth in West Yorkshire. The abolished constituency of Dearne Valley was split between Don Valley, Wentworth and Barnsley East. Rotherham was left unchanged.

A substantial part of Barnsley (renamed Barnsley Central) was included in the new seat of Barnsley West and Penistone, which also included part of Penistone, the majority of which was added to Sheffield Hillsborough. To compensate, parts of this seat were transferred to Sheffield Brightside and Sheffield Central (formerly Sheffield Park) leading to knock on impacts to Sheffield Hallam and Sheffield Heeley, with Sheffield Attercliffe largely unchanged.

===== West Yorkshire (23) =====
Ripon was abolished and distributed between the new seat of Skipton and Ripon (see North Yorkshire) and the continuing seats of Keighley, Shipley and Leeds North West (see below). Other small changes affected Keighley and Shipley, as well as Bradford North, Bradford South, Bradford West and Halifax. Having lost Sowerby Bridge to Halifax and gained Brighouse from the abolished seat of Brighouse and Spenborough, Sowerby was renamed Calder Valley.

The majority of Brighouse and Spenborough formed Batley and Spen, with the addition of Batley from Batley and Morley - in turn, Morley was combined with about half of Leeds South to form Morley and Leeds South. The remainder of Leeds South was included in Leeds Central with the majority of Leeds South East. Further moderate changes within the city of Leeds affected Leeds Central, Leeds East, Leeds North East, Leeds North West and Leeds West. Barkston Ash was abolished and primarily split between the new seats of Elmet and Selby (see North Yorkshire). Pudsey was unchanged.

Huddersfield was formed largely from Huddersfield East together with about half of Huddersfield West - the other half being added to Colne Valley in compensation for the loss of Saddleworth to the new seat of Littleborough and Saddleworth in Greater Manchester. There were further knock-on impacts to the continuing seats of Dewsbury, Wakefield, Normanton, Pontefract and Castleford, and Hemsworth, with the last of these transferring a substantial part to the new seat of Barnsley East in South Yorkshire.

=== Northern Ireland ===
The addition of five seats was achieved through the abolition of two and the creation of seven constituencies. The four Belfast seats (Belfast East, Belfast North, Belfast South and Belfast West) were retained with changes to bring the electorates in line. East Antrim was carved out of parts of North Antrim and South Antrim, with a substantial part of the latter also forming the majority of Lagan Valley. Strangford was largely carved out of North Down. Armagh was abolished and split into Newry and Armagh, and Upper Bann, with parts of South Down being included in both. Similarly, Londonderry was abolished and split into East Londonderry and Foyle, with parts of Mid Ulster being included in both. A small area was transferred from Fermanagh and South Tyrone to Mid Ulster.

=== Scotland ===
Number of seats increased by one.

==== Borders (2 seats) ====
Roxburgh, Selkirk and Peebles was divided between Tweeddale, Ettrick and Lauderdale, and Roxburgh and Berwickshire, with the latter including Berwickshire from the abolished constituency of Berwick and East Lothian (see Lothian).

==== Central (4 seats) ====
Major reconfiguration with Clackmannan and East Stirlingshire, West Stirlingshire, and Stirling, Falkirk and Grangemouth being replaced by Clackmannan, Stirling, Falkirk East and Falkirk West.

==== Dumfries and Galloway (2 seats) ====
The area of Upper Nithsdale was transferred from Dumfries to Galloway (renamed Galloway and Upper Nithsdale).

==== Fife (5 seats) ====
The majority of Dunfermline formed Dunfermline West, with a smaller area being included in Dunfermline East. The latter also included a substantial part of Central Fife which was compensated with transfers from Kirkcaldy and East Fife (renamed North East Fife).

==== Grampian (6 seats) ====
Moray and Nairn and East Aberdeenshire were largely replaced by Moray and Banff and Buchan respectively, with Banff being split between these two new seats. Gordon largely replaced West Aberdeenshire. Aberdeen city centre was transferred from Aberdeen North to Aberdeen South. Parts of the latter were included in the new seat of Kincardine and Deeside which also included about half of the abolished seat of North Angus and Mearns.

==== Highland (3 seats) ====
Caithness and Sutherland was virtually unchanged. The Isle of Skye was transferred to Ross and Cromarty (renamed Ross, Cromarty and Skye) from Inverness which was renamed Inverness, Nairn and Lochaber, having gained Nairn from the abolished constituency of Moray and Nairn (see Grampian).

==== Lothian (10 seats) ====
The majority of West Lothian formed Linlithgow, with the remainder being included in Livingston, which also included areas of Midlothian. Edinburgh North was abolished, with its contents distributed between Edinburgh Central, Edinburgh East, Edinburgh Leith and Edinburgh West. Further boundary changes affected these four seats, as well as Edinburgh South and Edinburgh Pentlands, with the latter also including part of Midlothian. Musselburgh was transferred from Edinburgh East to East Lothian, which replaced Berwick and East Lothian.

==== Strathclyde (33 seats) ====
Having gained the Isle of Bute, Argyll was renamed Argyll and Bute. Although they were barely changed, West Dunbartonshire and Central Dunbartonshire were renamed Dumbarton, and Clydebank and Milngavie respectively. East Dunbartonshire was split into Cumbernauld and Kilsyth, and Strathkelvin and Bearsden, with the former including Kilsyth, previously part of the abolished seat of West Stirlingshire (see Central), and the latter part of North Lanarkshire. The remainder of North Lanarkshire, Coatbridge and Airdrie and parts of Bothwell were replaced by Monklands East, Monklands West and Motherwell North, whilst Motherwell and Wishaw became Motherwell South with only minor changes. There were smaller changes to the south of the River Clyde affecting Hamilton, Lanark (renamed Clydesdale), East Kilbride and Rutherglen (now officially named Glasgow Rutherglen).

Glasgow lost the three seats of Glasgow Kelvingrove, Glasgow Queen's Park and Glasgow Craigton with consequent knock on changes to the continuing seats of Glasgow Garscadden, Glasgow Hillhead, Glasgow Maryhill, Glasgow Springburn, Glasgow Provan, Glasgow Shettleston, Glasgow Central, Glasgow Govan, Glasgow Pollok and Glasgow Cathcart. Glagow Shettleston included parts of Bothwell and Rutherglen.

West of Glasgow, Paisley was split between Paisley North and Paisley South with each including parts of both West Renfrewshire (renamed Renfrew West and Inverclyde) and East Renfrewshire (renamed Eastwood). Greenock and Port Glasgow was retained with minor adjustments. Bute and North Ayrshire and Central Ayrshire were replaced by Cunninghame North and Cunninghame South. Ayr was expanded to included the town of Troon, whilst Kilmarnock and South Ayrshire were unchanged but renamed Kilmarnock and Loudoun, and Carrick, Cumnock and Doon Valley respectively.

==== Tayside (5 seats) ====
Dundee East and Dundee West were virtually unchanged. In the rest of the region, North Angus and Mearns (part - see Grampian), South Angus, Perth and East Perthshire, and Kinross and West Perthshire were replaced by Angus East, North Tayside, and Perth and Kinross.

==== Island Areas (2 seats) ====
The constituencies of Orkney and Shetland, and Western Isles were unchanged.

=== Wales ===
Number of sets increased by two.

==== Clwyd (5 seats) ====
An additional seat resulted in a major reconfiguration in Clwyd, with only a reduced Wrexham retained. Denbigh, East Flint and West Flint were replaced by Alyn and Deeside, Delyn, Clwyd North West and Clwyd South West.

==== Dyfed (4 seats) ====
Part of Pembroke was transferred to Cardigan, which was renamed Ceredigion and Pembroke North. There was a minor realignment of the boundary between Carmarthen and Llanelli.

==== Gwent (6 seats) ====
Newport was split between Newport East and Newport West, with both seats also including parts of Monmouth. Abertillery, Bedwellty and Ebbw Vale were largely replaced by Blaenau Gwent and Islwyn, with small parts being included in Caerphilly, and Merthyr Tydfil and Rhymney (see Mid Glamorgan). An unchanged Pontypool was renamed Torfaen.

==== Gwynedd (4 seats) ====
Anglesey (now formally named Ynys Môn) and Caernarfon were unchanged and there were only minor changes to Conwy and Merioneth (renamed Meirionnydd Nant Conwy).

==== Mid Glamorgan (7 seats) ====
Bridgend was formed from parts of Aberavon (see West Glamorgan) and Ogmore, with the latter gaining a small area of Pontypridd which also transferred part to Vale of Glamorgan (see South Glamorgan). There was a minor change to Aberdare, now named Cynon Valley, and Rhondda was unchanged. Merthyr Tydfil was expanded to include Rhymney and was renamed Merthyr Tydfil and Rhymney. There were small changes to Caerphilly.

==== Powys (2 seats) ====
Montgomery was unchanged, but Brecon and Radnor lost several small areas in the south.

==== South Glamorgan (5 seats) ====
The existing Cardiff North seat was subsumed into the new seat of Cardiff Central, with a virtually unchanged Cardiff North West then renamed Cardiff North. Cardiff Central also included part of Cardiff South East, the remainder of which formed the majority of Cardiff South and Penarth - the town of Penarth having been previously part of Barry. The remainder of Barry formed the majority of Vale of Glamorgan, which included a part of Pontypridd (see Mid Glamorgan). There was a minor change to Cardiff West.

==== West Glamorgan (5 seats) ====
Part of Aberavon was included in the new seat of Bridgend (see Mid Glamorgan) which resulted in knock-on changes to Neath, Gower, Swansea East and Swansea West.
