= Edward Knatchbull-Hugessen =

Edward Knatchbull-Hugessen may refer to:

- Edward Knatchbull-Hugessen, 1st Baron Brabourne (1829–1893), British politician
- Edward Knatchbull-Hugessen, 2nd Baron Brabourne (1857–1909), British politician
