= Maurice Craig =

Maurice Craig may refer to:

- Maurice Craig (historian) (1919–2011), Irish architectural historian
- Maurice Craig (psychiatrist) (1866–1935), British psychiatrist
