= Baron Balfour of Inchrye =

Extinct barony in the Peerage of the United Kingdom

Barony of Balfour of Inchrye
- Argent, on a chevron indented sable between in chief a rose gules and in base a saltire couped azure, an otter's head erased of the first, a bordure engrailed of the third
- Creation date: 5 July 1945
- Created by: George VI
- Peerage: Peerage of the United Kingdom
- First holder: Harold Balfour
- Last holder: Ian Balfour, 2nd Baron Balfour of Inchrye
- Remainder to: The 1st Baron's heirs male of the body lawfully begotten
- Extinction date: 14 April 2013
- Motto: Adsit Deus ("God be with me")

Baron Balfour of Inchrye, of Shefford in the County of Berkshire, was a title in the Peerage of the United Kingdom. It was created in the 1945 Birthday Honours for the Conservative politician Harold Balfour. He represented the Isle of Thanet in the House of Commons and served as Under-Secretary of State for Air from 1938 to 1944.

His son Ian (21 December 1924 – 14 April 2013), the second Baron, succeeded in 1988. He was a diamond historian (author of the book Famous Diamonds, 1987, Fifth ed. 2008) and the composer of nine operas and six symphonies. He died in 2013 leaving a daughter, the Hon. Roxane Laird Craig, but no male heir.

== Barons Balfour of Inchyre (1945) ==
- Harold Harington Balfour, 1st Baron Balfour of Inchrye (1897–1988)
- Ian Balfour, 2nd Baron Balfour of Inchrye (1924–2013)
