= 1919 Isle of Thanet by-election =

British House of Commons

- 15 November 1919
- Turnout: 52.8%
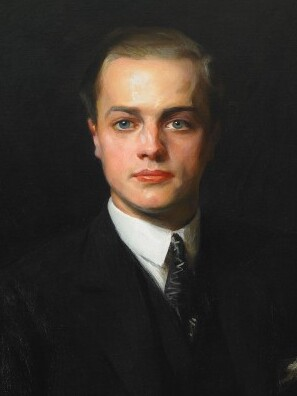

Candidate	Esmond Harmsworth	William West
Party	Unionist	Liberal
Popular vote	9,711	7,058
Percentage	57.9%	42.1%
Swing	▼9.0%	▲9.0%
MP before election
Norman Craig
Unionist
Subsequent MP
Esmond Harmsworth
Unionist

The 1919 Isle of Thanet by-election was a parliamentary by-election for the British House of Commons constituency of Isle of Thanet on 15 November 1919.

== Vacancy ==
The by-election was caused by the death of the sitting Unionist MP, Norman Carlyle Craig on 14 October 1919. He had been MP here since winning the seat in January 1910. The constituency had been held by the Unionists since its creation in 1885.

== Electoral history ==
At the 1918 general election, Craig was returned unopposed, having been in receipt of the Coalition 'coupon'. The result at the last contested election was:

January 1910 general election
Party	Candidate	Votes	%	±%
Unionist	Norman Carlyle Craig	6,892	66.9	+15.6
Liberal	Julian William Wellesley Weigall	3,410	33.1	−6.4
Majority		3,482	33.8	+22.0
Turnout		10,302	81.8	−2.6
Unionist hold		Swing	+11.0	

== Candidates ==

- The local Unionists adopted as candidate, 22-year-old Hon. Esmond Harmsworth. He was part of the Northcliffe-Rothermere Press family which owned newspapers such as the Daily Mail. Although adopted by the Unionists, he considered contesting the election as an 'Anti-Waste' candidate, opposed to what the Rothermere Press had labelled as excessive Coalition Government spending. However, he was persuaded to stand as an official Unionist but allowed to fight the election on a programme of measures in opposition to the Coalition Government and as a result did not receive the coalition 'coupon'.
- The Liberals chose William J. West as their candidate. He had contested Winchester at the last election, coming second. West had been politically active in Battersea working for John Burns. In 1904 he served as Mayor of Battersea and was a founder of the Railway Clerks Trade Union.

== Main issues and campaign ==
At the 1918 general election, Coalition Liberal Prime Minister, David Lloyd George had famously stated that the task for the new government would be to build "Homes fit for Heroes". His plan was for the government to raise funds through taxation to allow local councils to build houses and Coalition Liberal Reconstruction Minister, Christopher Addison successfully steered through Parliament the Housing Act 1919. However, there were parts of the Unionist Party that opposed these plans including Harmsworth. Harmsworth's Anti-Waste platform of cuts in government spending and reductions in Income Tax was enthusiastically supported by The Times, the Daily Mail and the Daily Mirror. He also had the active support of Horatio Bottomley, a prominent right-wing MP who had founded the People's League in opposition to the government. At an eve of poll meeting in support of Harmsworth, Bottomley proclaimed that he expected in about 2 years to be asked by the King to form a 'business administration'.

== Result ==
As expected, the Unionists held the seat but the Liberals polled strongly. Compared to the last contested election, there had been a 9% swing to the Liberals.

Isle of Thanet by-election, 1919
Party	Candidate	Votes	%	±%
Unionist	Esmond Harmsworth	9,711	57.9	−9.0
Liberal	William J. West	7,058	42.1	+9.0
Majority		2,653	15.8	−18.0
Turnout		16,769	52.8	−29.0
Unionist hold		Swing	-9.0	

When Harmsworth took his seat he became the Baby of the House.

== Aftermath ==
Despite Harmsworth's disappointing result, the issue of taxes/public spending continued to dominate the 1919-22 parliament and an Anti-Waste League was formed to rally right-wing opinion and contest future by-elections. The Coalition Government's Council House Building Policies continued. Bottomley was not asked to form a government by the King but was to serve at His Majesty's Pleasure for 7 years at Wormwood Scrubs. The result at the following General election;

1922 general election: Isle of Thanet
Party	Candidate	Votes	%	±%
Unionist	Esmond Harmsworth	16,116	61.2	+3.3
Liberal	Alfred Suenson-Taylor	10,226	38.8	−3.3
Majority		5,890	22.4	+6.6
Turnout		26,342	68.4	+15.6
Unionist hold		Swing		

Harmsworth continued to sit for the constituency until 1929.

== See also ==
- List of United Kingdom by-elections
- United Kingdom by-election records
