= 1888 Isle of Thanet by-election =

UK parliamentary by-election

The 1888 Isle of Thanet by-election was held on 29 June 1888 after the death of the incumbent Conservative MP Edward Robert King-Harman. The seat was retained by the Conservative candidate James Lowther, a former MP and government minister.

Isle of Thanet by-election, 1888
Party	Candidate	Votes	%	±%
Conservative	Rt Hon. James Lowther	3,547	55.1	−17.1
Liberal	Hon. Edward Knatchbull-Hugessen	2,889	44.9	+17.1
Majority		658	10.2	−34.2
Turnout		6,436	78.2	+18.9
Conservative hold		Swing	-17.1	
