= Polly Billington =

British politician (born 1967)

Polly Billington MP
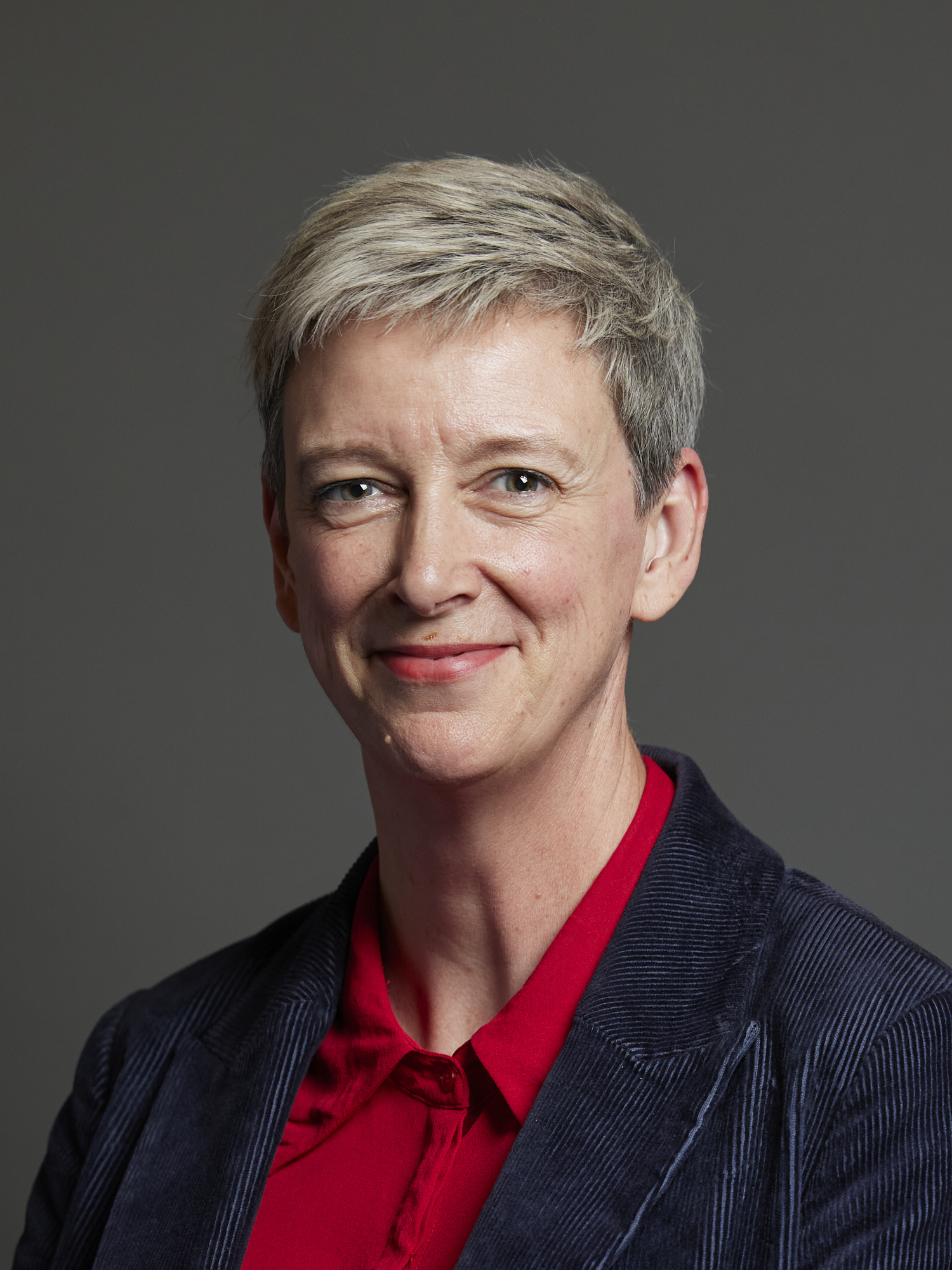
- Official portrait, 2024

Parliamentary Under-Secretary of State for Energy Consumers
- Incumbent
- Assumed office 21 July 2026
- Prime Minister: Andy Burnham
- Preceded by: Martin McCluskey

Member of Parliament for East Thanet
- Incumbent
- Assumed office 4 July 2024
- Preceded by: Craig Mackinlay (South Thanet (Note: The South Thanet constituency was renamed "East Thanet" at the 2024 general election, with moderate boundary changes.))
- Majority: 6,971 (16.3%)

Personal details
- Born: November 1967 (age 58)
- Party: Labour
- Education: University of Sussex (BA)

Polly Billington (born November 1967) is a British politician who has been the Member of Parliament (MP) for East Thanet since 2024. A member of the Labour Party, she has served as Parliamentary Under-Secretary of State in the Department for Energy Security and Net Zero since 2026.

Prior to her election she was an environmental campaigner and had worked as a broadcast journalist for the BBC before becoming a special adviser to Ed Miliband. She was the media director for his successful bid in the 2010 Labour leadership election. In 2016, she founded the climate politics network UK100.

== Education ==
Billington was educated at the Ursuline High School, Wimbledon, an all-girls Catholic school. She studied history and French at Sussex University, graduating with a Bachelor of Arts (BA) degree in 1990. She then undertook a postgraduate diploma in broadcast journalism at the department of Journalism, Media and Communication, University of Central Lancashire in 1993.

== Professional career ==
Billington was a BBC reporter for the Today programme, News 24, the Politics Show, Newsbeat, and on Radio 1 as the first dedicated Political Reporter for Newsbeat.

Billington was the head of communications and campaigns at Citizens Advice from January 2013 to January 2015, coordinating campaigns on energy, welfare and payday loans, before resigning to fight the highly marginal three-way contest of Thurrock at the general election.

Billington founded UK100 in 2016, a network for UK locally elected leaders who have pledged to switch to 100% clean energy by 2050. She served as the CEO until February 2023 when she was selected as a parliamentary candidate.

Billington received the Business Green Leader of the Year Award in 2023, for her "inspirational role in establishing UK100 as one of the most respected and important voices on climate policy in the UK".

Politico Europe reported in May 2023 that Billington had accepted a senior adviser role at Hanover Communications - in their election planning team.

== Politics ==
Billington became a special adviser to Ed Miliband in 2007 when he was working on party policy and election strategy in the Cabinet Office and according to The Daily Telegraph she was the 59th most influential person on the UK left in 2011.

She was the media director for Ed Miliband's successful Labour leadership bid.

In December 2011, Billington was selected for Thurrock, a marginal seat. She was one of 15 Labour candidates each given financial support of £10,000 by Lord Matthew Oakeshott in January 2015. The tight three-way contest resulted in a Tory hold by 536 votes over Billington with UKIP coming third.

Billington worked on Sadiq Khan's campaign to be selected as Labour's mayoral candidate for London, leading on communications. She was one of two Labour Party councillors elected to De Beauvoir ward in the 2018 Hackney London Borough Council election, with 1,448 votes. She was reelected in 2022, with 1,400 votes.

Billington has served as an executive member of SERA, Labour's Environment Campaign and is on the advisory group of Labour Climate and Environment Forum.

On 24 February 2023 she was selected by local Labour party members as the parliamentary candidate for East Thanet at the 2024 general election. She was elected in the general election on 4 July 2024.

== Personal life ==
Billington is LGBTQ, and has received support from the Chris Smith List.

== Notes ==
Parliament of the United Kingdom
Preceded by Craig Mackinlay (South Thanet)	Member of Parliament for East Thanet; 2024–present	Incumbent
