= William Rees-Davies (politician) =

British politician

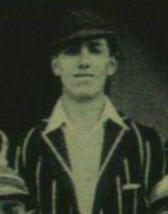
Rees-Davies as a member of the Eton cricket team

William Rupert Rees-Davies QC (19 November 1916 – 12 January 1992) was a British Conservative politician and barrister.

== Early life ==
Rees-Davies was the son of Sir William Rees-Davies, Chief Justice of Hong Kong. He was born in Hong Kong while his father was serving as Chief Justice. His grandfather was William Davies, Liberal MP for Pembrokeshire

He was educated at Eton College and Trinity College, Cambridge, where he gained a cricket blue. He also played for the Kent Second XI. He was a right-arm fast-medium bowler.

== Non-political career ==
He was a barrister, called to the bar by Inner Temple in 1939. He was appointed a Queen's Counsel in 1973. He was commissioned in the Welsh Guards in 1939 and served until 1943 when he lost his right arm on service during World War II. Because he had lost his arm, he was some time referred to as the "one armed bandit".

== Political career ==
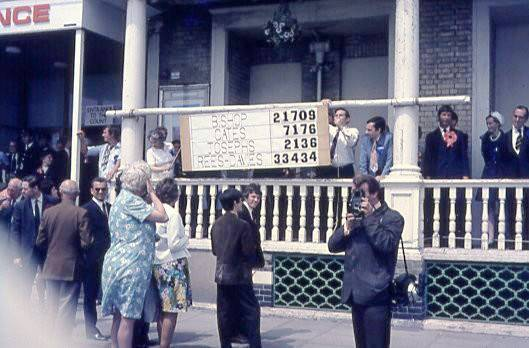
Rees-Davies is re-elected MP for the Isle of Thanet Constituency with 33,434 votes. The results were declared outside Granville House, Ramsgate. Photographed by Eric Easton, 18 June 1970.

Rees-Davies contested Nottingham South in 1950 and 1951. He was Member of Parliament for the Isle of Thanet from a 1953 by-election to 1974, then for Thanet West from 1974 to 1983 when his seat was abolished in boundary changes. He lost the selection for North Thanet to Roger Gale, and his attempts to reverse his deselection failed. He died in 1992, aged 75.

Parliament of the United Kingdom
Preceded by Edward Carson	Member of Parliament for Isle of Thanet; 1953 – February 1974	Constituency abolished
New constituency	Member of Parliament for Thanet West; February 1974 – 1983	Constituency abolished
