= 1953 Isle of Thanet by-election =

UK Parliamentary by-election

The 1953 Isle of Thanet by-election was held on 12 March 1953. It was held due to the resignation of the incumbent Conservative MP, Hon. Edward Carson. It was retained by the Conservative candidate, William Rees-Davies.

1953 Isle of Thanet by-election
Party	Candidate	Votes	%	±%
Conservative	William Rees-Davies	25,261	61.3	−0.3
Labour	F. Woodbridge	15,935	38.7	+0.3
Majority		9,326	22.6	−0.6
Turnout		41,196	58.7	−19.3
Conservative hold		Swing		
