= 1904 Isle of Thanet by-election =

UK parliamentary by-election

← 1900	7 October 1904	1906 →

Candidate	Marks	King
Party	Conservative	Liberal
Popular vote	4,048	3,666
Percentage	52.5%	47.5%
MP before election
James Lowther
Conservative
Subsequent MP
Harry Marks
Conservative

The 1904 Isle of Thanet by-election was held in the UK Parliament constituency of the Isle of Thanet on 7 October 1904, following the death of Conservative Party MP James Lowther. It was successfully defended for the Conservative party by Harry Marks.

== Vacancy ==
Conservative Party MP James Lowther died on 12 September 1904, triggering a by-election to fill the vacancy.

== Electoral history ==
The Isle of Thanet seat had been held by the Conservative party since its creation in 1885. In the 1900 general election Conservative candidate James Lowther was elected unopposed.

General election 1900: Isle of Thanet
Party	Candidate	Votes	%	±%
Conservative	James Lowther	Unopposed	N/A	N/A
Conservative hold				

== Candidates ==
In anticipation of a forthcoming general election, the local Liberal association, about 6 months earlier, had selected 44 year old Joseph King as their candidate. He lived in Surrey, where he had previously been elected to the county council.

== Campaign ==
The usually Conservative supporting newspaper The Times, took a position in opposition to the Conservative candidate.

== Result ==
Isle of Thanet by-election, 1904
Party	Candidate	Votes	%	±%
Conservative	Harry Marks	4,048	52.5	N/A
Liberal	Joseph King	3,666	47.5	New
Majority		382	5.0	N/A
Turnout		7,714	71.3	N/A
Conservative hold		Swing	N/A	

== Aftermath ==
Marks held the seat at the subsequent general election.

General election 1906: Isle of Thanet
Party	Candidate	Votes	%	±%
Conservative	Harry Marks	5,154	51.3	−1.2
Liberal	Joseph King	3,961	39.5	−8.0
Ind. Conservative	Frederick E McCormick Goodhart	925	9.2	New
Majority		1,193	11.8	+6.8
Turnout		10,040	84.4	+13.1
Conservative hold		Swing		

Marks would go on to represent the constituency until retiring in 1910.
