= North Thanet =

UK Parliament constituency (1983–2024)

Coordinates: 51°22.5′N 1°16′E

- Former county constituency for the House of Commons
- Boundary of North Thanet in Kent

- Location of Kent within England
- County: Kent
- Electorate: 67,110 (December 2010)
- Major settlements: Margate and Herne Bay

1983–2024
- Seats: One
- Created from: Thanet West, Thanet East
- Replaced by: Herne Bay and Sandwich, East Thanet

North Thanet was a constituency (Note: A county constituency (for the purposes of election expenses and type of returning officer)) in Kent. It was represented in the House of Commons of the UK Parliament since its 1983 creation until abolition by Sir Roger Gale, a Conservative. (Note: As with all constituencies, the constituency elects one Member of Parliament (MP) by the first past the post system of election at least every five years.)

Further to the completion of the 2023 review of Westminster constituencies, the seat was abolished. Subjected to moderate boundary changes, it was reformed as Herne Bay and Sandwich, and first contested at the 2024 general election.

== History ==
North Thanet and South Thanet were created by a rearrangement of the former Thanet West and Thanet East constituencies in 1983, which in turn had been created in 1974 by the splitting of the single Isle of Thanet seat. Apart from 1997, when it was marginal, the seat has been a safe seat for the Conservative Party.

The third-placed opponent in the 1983 election, for Labour, was Cherie Blair whose husband Tony Blair, was Prime Minister between 1997 and 2007. He entered Parliament that same year, representing Sedgefield: the couple are said to have had a pact that whichever one of them became an MP first would be the one to pursue that career, and not the other. Cherie thus continued with her legal career whilst Tony was an MP.

== Constituency profile ==
Tourism forms an important economic activity with sandy beaches, particularly at Margate: among the main attractions, the seat has a small amount of fishing relative to the 19th century or major ports of North East and Scotland. It also has a slightly higher proportion of retired people than the national average and incomes tending to be clustered towards the national mean. Economic developments have included the Thanet Offshore Wind Project, as well as commercial, recreational and tourism activities. Manston Airport is now closed but is subject to competing development plans, including reopening the airport for freight terminal or alternatively as a mixed development business park. In unemployment terms the claimant count was third highest of the South East's 84 constituencies at the end of 2010. (Note: Above this were South Thanet and Hastings and Rye)

== Boundaries ==
Map of boundaries 2010–2024

1983–2010: The District of Thanet wards of Birchington East, Birchington West, Cecil, Cliftonville, Dane Park, Ethelbert, Margate West, Marine, Northdown Park, Pier, Salmestone, Thanet Parishes, and Westgate-on-Sea, and the City of Canterbury wards of Herne, Heron, Reculver, and West Bay.

2010–2024: The District of Thanet wards of Birchington North, Birchington South, Dane Valley, Garlinge, Margate Central, Salmestone, Thanet Villages, Westbrook, and Westgate-on-Sea, and the City of Canterbury wards of Greenhill and Eddington, Herne and Broomfield, Heron, Marshside, Reculver, and West Bay.

North Thanet contained the northern and western parts of Thanet District (most of Margate, apart from the Cliftonville area), Westgate-on-Sea, Birchington-on-Sea, and several villages including Acol, St Nicholas-at-Wade, Minster, Manston, Monkton and Sarre) as well as the town of Herne Bay in the City of Canterbury district.

== Members of Parliament ==
Election	Member	Party
1983	Sir Roger Gale	Conservative

== Elections ==
=== Elections in the 2010s ===
General election 2019: North Thanet
Party	Candidate	Votes	%	±%
Conservative	Roger Gale	30,066	62.4	+6.2
Labour	Coral Jones	12,877	26.7	−7.3
Liberal Democrats	Angie Curwen	3,439	7.1	+3.8
Green	Robert Edwards	1,796	3.7	+2.0
Majority		17,189	35.7	+13.5
Turnout		48,178	66.2	−0.4
Conservative hold		Swing	+6.8	

General election 2017: North Thanet
Party	Candidate	Votes	%	±%
Conservative	Roger Gale	27,163	56.2	+7.2
Labour	Frances Rehal	16,425	34.0	+16.1
UKIP	Clive Egan	2,198	4.5	−21.2
Liberal Democrats	Martyn Pennington	1,586	3.3	−0.2
Green	Ed Targett	825	1.7	−2.0
CPA	Iris White	128	0.3	New
Majority		10,738	22.2	−1.1
Turnout		48,325	66.6	−3.5
Conservative hold		Swing	−4.5	

General election 2015: North Thanet
Party	Candidate	Votes	%	±%
Conservative	Roger Gale	23,045	49.0	−3.7
UKIP	Piers Wauchope	12,097	25.7	+19.2
Labour	Frances Rehal	8,411	17.9	−3.6
Green	Edward Targett	1,719	3.7	New
Liberal Democrats	George Cunningham	1,645	3.5	−15.9
Majority		10,948	23.3	−8.9
Turnout		47,053	70.1	+6.9
Conservative hold		Swing	−3.7	

General election 2010: North Thanet
Party	Candidate	Votes	%	±%
Conservative	Roger Gale	22,826	52.7	+4.7
Labour	Michael Britton	9,298	21.5	−11.1
Liberal Democrats	Laura Murphy	8,400	19.4	+3.8
UKIP	Rosamund Parker	2,819	6.5	+2.6
Majority		13,528	31.2	+15.8
Turnout		43,343	63.2	+3.1
Conservative hold		Swing	+7.9	

=== Elections in the 2000s ===
General election 2005: North Thanet
Party	Candidate	Votes	%	±%
Conservative	Roger Gale	21,699	49.6	−0.7
Labour	Iris Johnston	14,065	32.2	−2.2
Liberal Democrats	Mark Barnard	6,279	14.4	+3.4
UKIP	Timothy Stocks	1,689	3.9	+1.6
Majority		7,634	17.4	+1.5
Turnout		43,732	60.1	+1.1
Conservative hold		Swing	+0.8	

General election 2001: North Thanet
Party	Candidate	Votes	%	±%
Conservative	Roger Gale	21,050	50.3	+6.2
Labour	James Laing	14,400	34.4	−4.0
Liberal Democrats	Seth Proctor	4,603	11.0	−0.4
UKIP	John Moore	980	2.3	+1.4
Independent	David Shortt	440	1.1	New
National Front	Tom Holmes	395	0.9	New
Majority		6,650	15.9	+10.2
Turnout		41,868	59.0	−9.8
Conservative hold		Swing		

=== Elections in the 1990s ===
General election 1997: North Thanet
Party	Candidate	Votes	%	±%
Conservative	Roger Gale	21,586	44.1	−13.1
Labour	Iris Johnston	18,820	38.4	+14.9
Liberal Democrats	Paul Kendrick	5,576	11.4	−6.3
Referendum	Marcus Chambers	2,535	5.2	New
UKIP	Jean Haines	438	0.9	New
Majority		2,766	5.7	−28.0
Turnout		48,955	68.8	−7.2
Conservative hold		Swing	−14.0	

General election 1992: North Thanet
Party	Candidate	Votes	%	±%
Conservative	Roger Gale	30,867	57.2	−0.8
Labour	Alan Bretman	12,657	23.5	+6.8
Liberal Democrats	Joanna Phillips	9,563	17.7	−5.6
Green	Hazel Dawe	873	1.6	−0.4
Majority		18,210	33.7	−1.0
Turnout		53,960	76.0	+3.8
Conservative hold		Swing	−3.8	

=== Elections in the 1980s ===
General election 1987: North Thanet
Party	Candidate	Votes	%	±%
Conservative	Roger Gale	29,225	58.0	−0.4
SDP	Nicholas Cranston	11,745	23.3	−3.4
Labour	Alan Bretman	8,395	16.7	+2.6
Green	David Condor	996	2.0	New
Majority		17,480	34.7	+3.0
Turnout		50,361	72.2	+2.2
Conservative hold		Swing		

General election 1983: North Thanet
Party	Candidate	Votes	%	±%
Conservative	Roger Gale	26,801	58.4	
SDP	William MacMillan	12,256	26.7	
Labour	Cherie Blair	6,482	14.1	
BNP	Brian Dobing	324	0.7	
Majority		14,051	31.7	
Turnout		45,863	70.0	
Conservative win (new seat)				

== See also ==
- List of parliamentary constituencies in Kent
