= Battersea (London County Council constituency) =

London County Council constituency

- Former constituency for the London County Council

Former constituency
- Created: 1889
- Abolished: 1919
- Member(s): 2
- Replaced by: Battersea North; Battersea South

Battersea was a constituency used for elections to the London County Council between 1889 and 1919. The seat shared boundaries with the UK Parliament constituency of the same name.

== Councillors ==
Year	Name	Party	Name	Party
1889	John Burns	Progressive	James Tims	Progressive
1893	John Burns	Progressive	William Willis	Progressive
1895	John Burns	Progressive	William J. Davies	Progressive
1907	Arthur Shirley Benn	Municipal Reform	William J. Davies	Progressive
1910	Walter Richard Warren	Progressive	William J. Davies	Progressive
1913	Walter Richard Warren	Progressive	William J. West	Progressive

== Election results ==
1889 London County Council election: Battersea
Party	Candidate	Votes	%	±%
Progressive	John Burns	3,071		
Progressive	James Tims	2,307		
Progressive	Andrew Cameron	1,279		
Radical	Robert Arthur Valpy	1,564		
Independent	George Harrison	188		
Vestryman	William Davies	54		
Progressive win (new seat)				
Progressive win (new seat)				

1892 London County Council election: Battersea
Party	Candidate	Votes	%	±%
Progressive	John Burns	5,168		
Progressive	James Tims	4,470		
Moderate	J. G. Taylor Whitehead	2,011		
Moderate	James Innes Michin	1,780		
Independent Progressive	Howarth Barnes	1,060		
Progressive hold		Swing		
Progressive hold		Swing		

1893 Battersea by-election
Party	Candidate	Votes	%	±%
Progressive	William Willis	2,817		
Moderate	Arthur Philip Quicke	2,165		
Social Democratic Federation	Harry B. Rogers	414		
Independent Labour	W. F. Grey	360		
Progressive hold		Swing		

1895 London County Council election: Battersea
Party	Candidate	Votes	%	±%
Progressive	William Davies	4,095		
Progressive	John Burns	3,940		
Moderate	A. T. Quicke	2,945		
Moderate	T. Costigan	2,921		
Progressive hold		Swing		
Progressive hold		Swing		

1898 London County Council election: Battersea
Party	Candidate	Votes	%	±%
Progressive	William Davies	5,284		
Progressive	John Burns	5,126		
Moderate	Rudolph Feilding	3,715		
Moderate	A. T. Quicke	3,670		
Progressive hold		Swing		
Progressive hold		Swing		

1901 London County Council election: Battersea
Party	Candidate	Votes	%	±%
Progressive	William Davies	5,951	38.6	
Progressive	John Burns	5,906	38.3	
Conservative	Stanley Boulter	1,829	11.9	
Conservative	John Dumphreys	1,746	11.3	
Progressive hold		Swing		
Progressive hold		Swing		

1904 London County Council election: Battersea
Party	Candidate	Votes	%	±%
Progressive	John Burns	5,513		
Progressive	William Davies	5,502		
Conservative	Francis Danford Thomas	2,503		
Progressive hold		Swing		
Progressive hold		Swing		

1907 London County Council election: Battersea
Party	Candidate	Votes	%	±%
Progressive	William Davies	7,250		
Municipal Reform	Arthur Benn	7,217		
Municipal Reform	Edwin Evans	6,691		
Progressive	William J. West	6,669		
Independent Socialist	W. H. Humphreys	489		
Socialist (GB)	Jack Fitzgerald	98		
Socialist (GB)	H. Jansen-Neumann	42		
Majority				
Municipal Reform gain from Progressive		Swing		
Progressive hold		Swing		

1910 London County Council election: Battersea
Party	Candidate	Votes	%	±%
Progressive	William Davies	7,254	26.3	
Progressive	Walter Richard Warren	7,049	25.6	
Municipal Reform	Arthur Benn	6,837	24.8	
Municipal Reform	Edwin Evans	6,441	23.4	
Majority		212	0.8	
Progressive gain from Municipal Reform		Swing		
Progressive hold		Swing		

1913 London County Council election: Battersea
Party	Candidate	Votes	%	±%
Progressive	Walter Richard Warren	5,483	27.5	+1.9
Progressive	William J. West	5,451	27.3	+1.0
Municipal Reform	H. Ramsden	4,502	22.6	−2.2
Municipal Reform	George Bettesworth Piggott	4,502	22.6	−0.8
Majority		949	4.7	+3.9
Progressive hold		Swing	+2.0	
Progressive hold		Swing		
