= William J. West (UK politician) =

British politician and trade unionist

West in 1919

William James West (born 15 July 1868) was a British Liberal Party politician and trade unionist. He served on the London County Council, and as Mayor of Battersea.

Born in Ramsgate, West worked for an insurance company, and joined the Peace Society and the temperance movement, attending a very large number of meetings. He also joined the Liberal and Radical Association, and was soon elected to its executive committee. When he was only nineteen, two years under the legal age, he served as polling agent for the Liberal-Labour Member of Parliament, John Burns.

In 1902, West became a railway clerk and joined the Railway Clerks' Association (RCA). He was parliamentary secretary of the union from 1903 until 1908, president from 1906 until 1908, and served as acting general secretary for part of 1906.

When Battersea Borough Council was formed, in 1900, West was elected as an alderman, and he served as Mayor of Battersea in 1904, the first worker to hold the post. At the 1913 London County Council election, he was elected in Battersea, representing the Progressive Party, although he lost his seat standing in Battersea South in 1919.

West stood unsuccessfully in Winchester at the 1918, 1923 and 1924 United Kingdom general elections, in the 1919 Isle of Thanet by-election, and in Battersea South at the 1929 United Kingdom general election.

Trade union offices
Preceded by Fortescue Flannery	President of the Railway Clerks' Association; 1906–1908	Succeeded by George Lathan
Civic offices
Preceded by William Watts	Mayor of Battersea; 1904–1905	Succeeded by William Rines
