= Norman Craig =

British politician

Norman Carlyle Craig

Member of Parliament for Isle of Thanet
- In office 1910 – 14 October 1919
- Preceded by: Harry Hananel Marks
- Succeeded by: Esmond Harmsworth

Personal details
- Born: 15 November 1868
- Died: 14 October 1919 (aged 50)
- Party: Conservative
- Spouse: Dorothy Stone
- Relations: Maurice Craig (psychiatrist), brother
- Education: Peterhouse, Cambridge
- Occupation: Barrister

Military service
- Allegiance: United Kingdom
- Branch/service: Royal Navy
- Rank: Lieutenant-Commander
- Battles/wars: World War I

Lieutenant-Commander Norman Carlyle Craig KC (15 November 1868 – 14 October 1919), was the Conservative Member of Parliament in the United Kingdom for the Isle of Thanet from 1910 until his death in 1919.

== Biography ==
Born on 15 November 1868, the son of William Simpson Craig, a doctor from Ham Common. He was brother of the prominent psychiatrist Sir Maurice Craig.

Craig was educated at Bedford School and as a classical scholar at Peterhouse, Cambridge. He was called to the Bar in 1892, appointed King's Counsel in 1909, and as a Bencher of the Inner Temple in 1919.

In January 1910, he was elected as a Member of Parliament for the Isle of Thanet, and was re-elected in 1918.

In 1912, he booked a passage to America on board the RMS Titanic. However, he cancelled his trip and was not on board when the vessel sank on 15 April. He cancelled his trip at such short notice that his name still appeared on the printed list of the Titanic's first-class passengers. This led to early newspaper reports that he was among the victims of the sinking.

During the First World War he became a Sub-Lieutenant in the Royal Naval Reserve. He was subsequently promoted to the rank of Lieutenant-Commander in the Royal Naval Volunteer Reserve.

In 1918, Craig married Dorothy Stone of Hoylake. He died on 14 October 1919 after failing to recover from an unspecified operation.

Parliament of the United Kingdom
Preceded by Harry Hananel Marks	Member of Parliament for Isle of Thanet; 1910–1919	Succeeded by Esmond Harmsworth
