= Harold Balfour, 1st Baron Balfour of Inchrye =

British fighter pilot and politician (1897–1988)

The Right Honourable The Lord Balfour of Inchrye MC & Bar PC
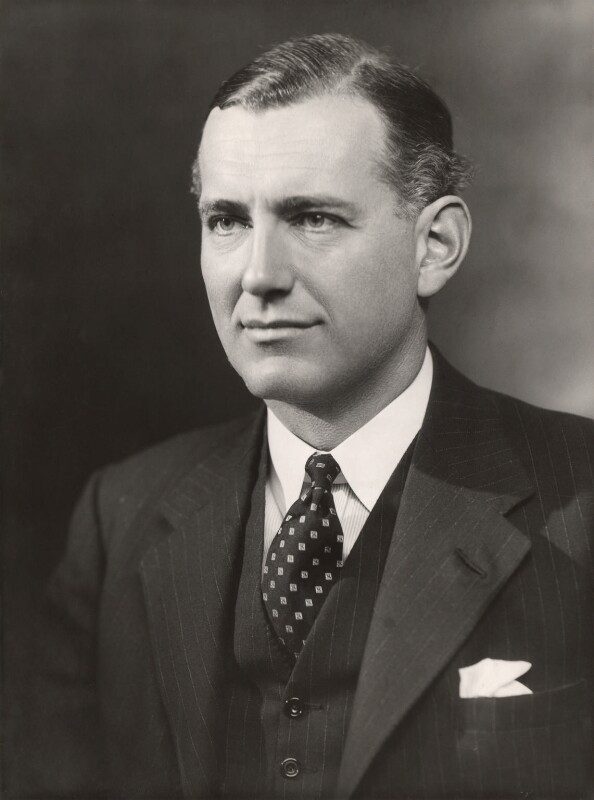
- Balfour in 1937

Minister Resident in West Africa
- In office 21 November 1944 – 26 July 1945
- Prime Minister: Winston Churchill
- Preceded by: The Viscount Swinton
- Succeeded by: Office abolished

Under-Secretary of State for Air
- In office 16 May 1938 – 21 November 1944 Serving with The Lord Sherwood (1941–1944)
- Prime Minister: Winston Churchill
- Preceded by: Anthony Muirhead
- Succeeded by: The Lord Sherwood and Rupert Brabner

Member of Parliament for Isle of Thanet
- In office 30 May 1929 – 15 June 1945
- Preceded by: Esmond Harmsworth
- Succeeded by: Edward Carson

Personal details
- Born: 1 November 1897 Camberley, Surrey, England
- Died: 21 September 1988 (aged 90) Shefford, Berkshire, England
- Party: Conservative

Military service
- Allegiance: United Kingdom
- Branch/service: British Army (1914–1918); Royal Air Force (1918–1923)
- Years of service: 1914–1923
- Rank: Major (British Army); Flying Officer (Royal Air Force)
- Unit: 60th Rifles (1914); No. 60 Squadron RFC (1915–1917); No. 43 Squadron RFC (1917); No. 40 Squadron RFC (1917–1918); No. 43 Squadron RAF (1918)
- Battles/wars: First World War: Western Front
- Awards: Military Cross & Bar

Harold Harington Balfour, 1st Baron Balfour of Inchrye (1 November 1897 – 21 September 1988), was a Conservative Party politician in the United Kingdom, and a flying ace of the First World War. As Under-Secretary of State for Air in 1944 he was instrumental in the establishment of London Heathrow Airport.

== Early years ==
Balfour was born in Camberley, Surrey, on 1 November 1897 to Colonel Nigel Harington Balfour (1873–1955) and Grace A. A. Maddocks, and educated at Chilverton Elms School, Dover, Kent, and later at the Royal Naval College, Osborne, Isle of Wight. He left the Royal Naval College after two years due to a combination of indiscipline and poor health, and completed his education at Blundells School in Devon.

== Aviator and fighter ace ==
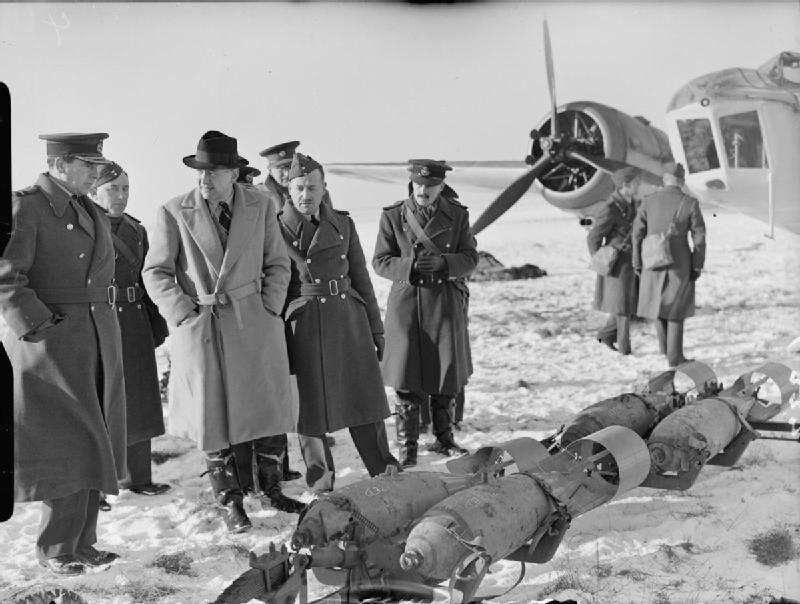
During the Second World War, the Under-Secretary of State for Air, H. H. Balfour, questions an Air Commodore about 250-lb GP bombs, which are about to be loaded into a Bristol Blenheim Mark IV of the Advanced Air Striking Force on a snow-covered airfield in France.

Balfour joined the 60th Rifles in 1914 and served in France for three months before he transferred to the Royal Flying Corps. After training he was posted to No. 60 Squadron. In 1917 he was serving with No. 43 Squadron when he downed two enemy aircraft while flying a Sopwith 1½ Strutter. He was injured in a crash and moved on to the School of Special Flying, No. 40 Squadron, then returned to No. 43 Squadron. Now piloting the Sopwith Camel he claimed 7 more victories and was promoted to major. Balfour then took command of a training school until 1919. He was private secretary and aide-de-camp to Air Vice Marshal Sir John Salmond 1921–1922, and temporary ADC to Sir Samuel Hoare, Secretary of State for Air, 1923. He retired from the Royal Air Force in 1923 to follow a career in journalism and business. Balfour was interviewed on 30 September 1978 by the art historian Anna Malinovska. The interview is reproduced in Voices in Flight (Pen & Sword Books, 2006). He also appeared as a contributor in the 1987 documentary 'The Cavalry of the Clouds', produced by British regional commercial television station 'HTV West'.

== Politician ==
Balfour contested Stratford without success in 1924 and was elected in 1929 as Member of Parliament (MP) for Isle of Thanet. He served in the Air Ministry from 1938 and was Minister Resident in West Africa, 1944–45. He was sworn in as a member of the Privy Council of the United Kingdom in 1941. He left the House of Commons in 1945 and was raised to the peerage as Baron Balfour of Inchrye, of Shefford in the County of Berkshire. Balfour died on 21 September 1988 aged 90.

== Family ==
He was married twice in 1921 and 1946 with a son from the first marriage to Diana B. Harvey, and a daughter from the second. His second wife was Mary Ainslie Profumo (d. 1999), sister of the disgraced cabinet minister John Profumo. After Profumo resigned and Lord Hailsham attacked his morals, Balfour remarked on live television, "When a man has by self-indulgence acquired the shape of Lord Hailsham, sexual continence requires no more than a sense of the ridiculous". Balfour's son, diamond historian Ian Balfour (1924–2013), became the 2nd Baron Balfour of Inchrye on his father's death; he married Josephina Maria Jane Bernard in 1953 – they had a daughter.

== Awards and decorations ==
- 26 May 1917: Balfour was awarded the Military Cross "for conspicuous gallantry and devotion to duty on many occasions. He has carried out many valuable reconnaissances under very adverse conditions. He has shot down two hostile machines".
- 22 April 1918: Balfour was awarded a bar to the Military Cross "for conspicuous gallantry and devotion to duty. On three occasions during one month he has destroyed one hostile machine and driven down two others completely out of control. On one occasion, flying at very low altitude, under extreme adverse weather conditions, he carried out a reconnaissance, in which he bombed two guns and silenced them, bombed large bodies of troops in a market square, and fired into the hangars and huts in a hostile aerodrome, several casualties being observed. He has at all times shown himself to be a leader of exceptional dash and ability, and offensive patrols led by him have constantly attacked enemy formations with marked gallantry and determination".
- 5 July 1945: Balfour gained the title 1st Baron Balfour of Inchrye, of Shefford in the County of Berkshire.

== Cultural portrayals ==
Balfour was portrayed by actor Harry Andrews in the 1969 film, Battle of Britain.

Parliament of the United Kingdom
Preceded by Esmond Harmsworth	Member of Parliament for Isle of Thanet; 1929–1945	Succeeded by Edward Carson
Political offices
Preceded by Anthony Muirhead	Under-Secretary of State for Air; 1938–1944 jointly with Lord Sherwood 1941–1944	Succeeded by Lord Sherwood; Rupert Brabner
Honorary titles
Preceded by The Duke of Beaufort	Senior Privy Counsellor; 1984–1988	Succeeded by The Earl of Listowel; The Lord Shawcross
Peerage of the United Kingdom
New creation	Baron Balfour of Inchrye; 1945–1988	Succeeded by Ian Balfour
