= Edward Carson (Conservative politician) =

British politician (1920–1987)

The Honourable Edward Carson

Member of Parliament for Isle of Thanet
- In office 5 July 1945 – 14 February 1953
- Preceded by: Harold Balfour
- Succeeded by: William Rees-Davies

Personal details
- Born: Edward Carson; 17 February 1920 Mayfair, London, England
- Died: 6 March 1987 (aged 67) East Sussex, England
- Party: Conservative
- Spouse: Heather Sclater (m. 1943)
- Children: 1
- Parent: Edward Carson
- Education: Eton College; Trinity Hall, Cambridge
- Nickname: Ned

Edward Carson (17 February 1920 – 6 March 1987) was a British Conservative politician.

== Personal life ==
The Hon. Edward Carson was the youngest child of Lord Carson's five children (born when his father was 66), and he was the only child of his father's second wife Lucy Frewen.

Carson married Heather, daughter of Frank Arthur Sclater, O.B.E., M.C., of Milford, Surrey, in 1943; their son, Edward Rory Carson, married Araminta, daughter of Sir John James MacDonald Horlick, 5th Baronet, in 1975.

Edward Carson was educated at Ludgrove School and then Eton College – as was his son (a barrister who lives in Henley-upon-Thames) and two of his grandsons – and at Trinity Hall, Cambridge.

Edward Carson was for a time Librarian for H M Customs and Excise and also served in their legal department in later life. He was a published author and notably penned The Ancient and Rightful Customs in 1972 which was widely considered the most valued tome on the history of the UK's Customs and Excise department.

== Member of Parliament ==
Carson was the member of parliament (MP) for the Isle of Thanet from 1945, when aged 25, until he resigned from the House of Commons for health reasons in 1953. He died in March 1987 at the age of 67.

Parliament of the United Kingdom
Preceded by Harold Balfour	Member of Parliament for Isle of Thanet; 1945–1953	Succeeded by William Rees-Davies
Preceded by Ernest Millington	Baby of the House; July 1945–1948	Succeeded by Roy Jenkins
