= Harry Marks (journalist) =

British politician and journalist (1855–1916)

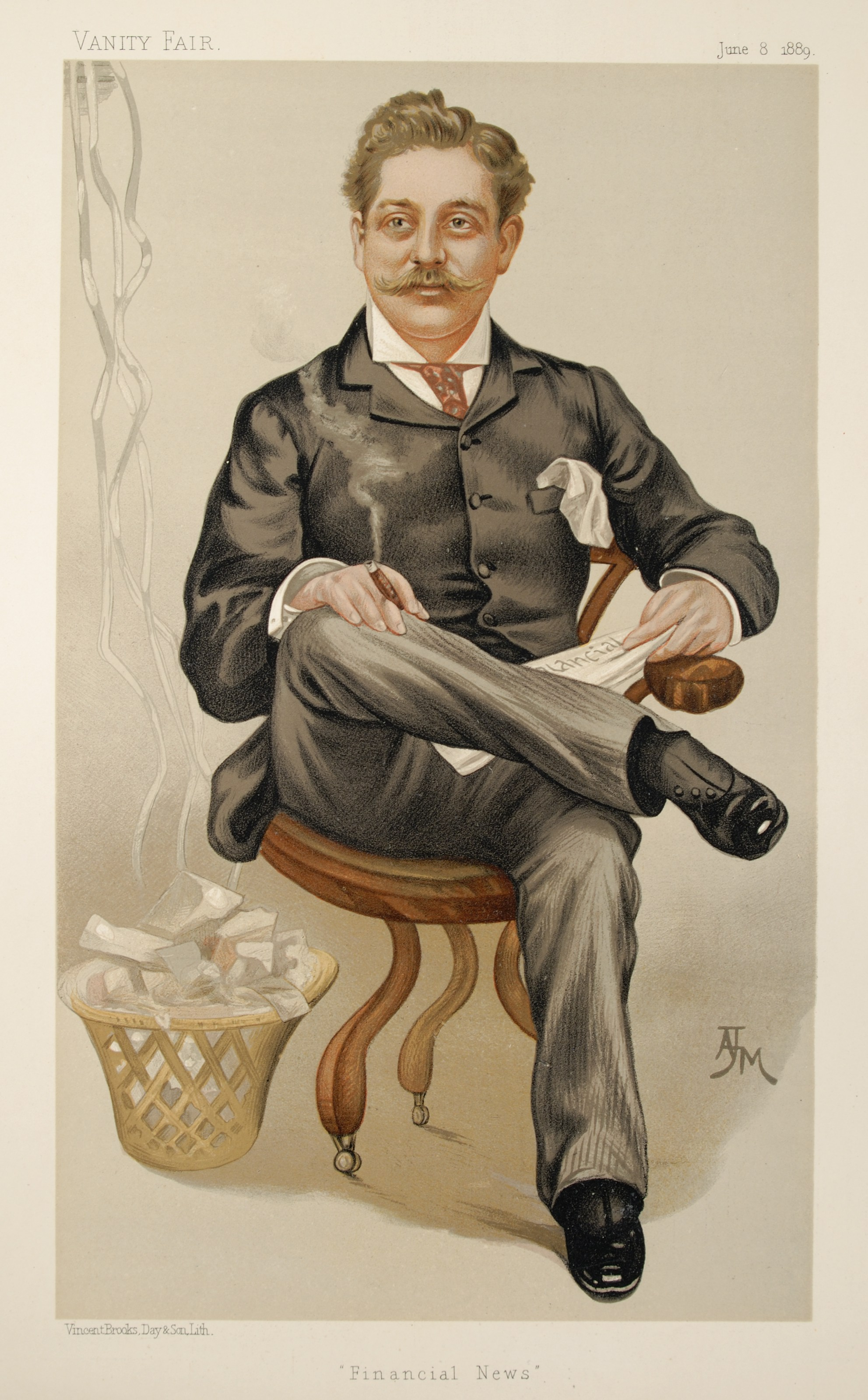
"Financial News" Harry Marks as caricatured in Vanity Fair, June 1889

Harry Hananel Marks (9 April 1855 – 21 December 1916) was a British politician and journalist, who founded the Financial News in 1884.

== Early life ==
Harry Marks was born in London on 9 April 1855, a younger child of David Woolf Marks and his wife Cecilia. David Woolf Marks, who came from a London merchant family, was a prominent reformist rabbi at the West London Synagogue, and the professor of Hebrew at University College London. Harry's younger brother, Claud Marks, would go on to gain distinction in the Army, being awarded the Distinguished Service Order for his service in the Boer War.

Marks attended University College School from 1864 to 1868, followed by a period at the Athénée Royal in Brussels, before travelling to the United States, aged 16, in 1871.

== United States ==
After arriving in New Orleans, Marks first job was selling sewing machines, before talking his way into a position writing for newspapers in Texas on the grounds of (non-existent) previous journalistic experience. In 1873 he moved to New York, where he worked for the New York World for five years, before later becoming editor of the Daily Mining News. This was his first foray into financial journalism, and there were widespread rumours that he had freely speculated in mining company shares, as well as more scandalous allegations involving seducing and defrauding the widow of one of his former business associates.

Whilst in the United States, Marks published Leaves from a Reporter's Note-Book (1882), which reflected on the life of a newspaper journalist. He also published the sharp satire Down with the Jews! Meeting of the Society for Suppressing the Jewish Race (1879), which attacked antisemitism among American politicians. He returned to England in 1883.

Whilst still editing the Daily Mining News, Marks founded the London halfpenny Evening News in 1881 in partnership with Coleridge Kennard; although initially successful, the paper lost most of its circulation by the early 1890s and was eventually sold to Alfred Harmsworth for £25,000 in 1894.

== Financial News ==
Shortly after his return to London, Marks founded the Financial and Mining News (later simply the Financial News) on 23 January 1884, with financial backing from an American, Colonel Edward McMurdo. He later floated the paper on the stock market in 1885 at a valuation of £50,000, reconstructing the company in 1890 to raise £100,000, whilst retaining a controlling interest throughout. The Financial News was a major step forwards for British financial newspapers; it was the first London financial paper to publish on a daily basis, and pioneered a popular, Americanised, accessible style of writing that appealed both to the industry professionals and to small private investors. The Financial News was active at investigative reporting, exposing a number of fraudulent share schemes as well as playing a part in the corruption scandals that led to the downfall of the Metropolitan Board of Works in the late 1880s. As a result, it achieved a good reputation for integrity and honesty, widely respected among small investors.

His contemporary Frank Harris later summed Marks up as a man of "few scruples and many interests"; nowhere was this more clear than the way in which he exploited his paper's reputation for his own commercial schemes.

His first major fraudulent venture was the Rae-Transvaal Gold Mining Company, formed to cash in on a boom in South African mining stocks. Marks had bought a farm in the Transvaal for £10,000, promptly selling it on to a newly created shell company at a notional value of £50,000. He then floated it in January 1887, with the Financial News stoking up enthusiasm for the stock. As the stock prices inflated, helped by the paper publishing fictional values, Marks sold out; the company was wound up in May 1888, by which time it had become apparent the Rae mine – and the company itself – was worthless. In 1890 he sued two journalists for libel over a pamphlet exposing his involvement in the matter. After an eight-day trial in which Marks' less salubrious past was extensively debated, the jury held that the content of the pamphlet was true, and that publishing it was justified in the public interest; Marks was forced to pay costs.

== Political career ==
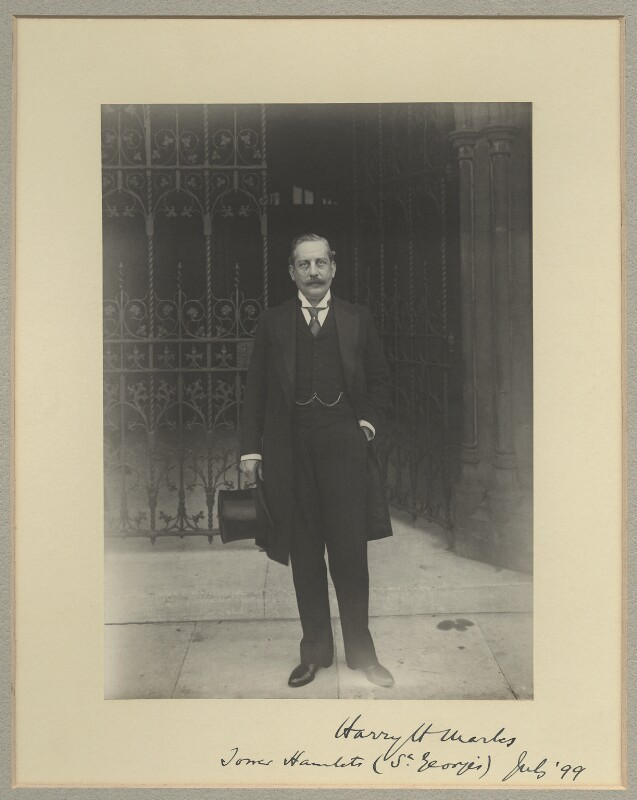
Harry Marks photographed in 1899

Marks's first political venture was in 1889, when he stood as a "Moderate" for election to the newly formed London County Council, in the East Marylebone district. Both seats in the district were won by the Moderate candidates, with Marks receiving 1,874 votes and Horace Farquhar 1,815; the nearest Progressive candidate, Sir Thomas Farrer, received 1,300. He was only a moderately active member, attending most council sessions but a substantially lower proportion of committees. He stood down from the LCC to contest the 1892 general election, where he was the Conservative candidate for Bethnal Green North East, running against the Liberal-Labour incumbent, George Howell. Howell won with a comfortable majority of almost six hundred, around 10% of the votes cast.

In the council elections of 1895 he was re-elected, to represent St George, Tower Hamlets; later that year, in the 1895 general election he contested the same constituency, narrowly defeating the Liberal John Williams Benn. His parliamentary election was marred by allegations of corrupt practices, though these were dismissed by a court. Marks stood down and did not contest the seat in the 1900 general election, but returned to the Commons in a 1904 by-election as the member for the Isle of Thanet. He defended the seat in the 1906 general election, but stood down for the second and final time in 1910, on grounds of ill health.

== Later life ==
Following a stroke in 1909, Marks handed over the editorship of the Financial News to Ellis Powell, but retained a controlling interest and the post of editor-in-chief. He and Powell frequently clashed over Marks's involvement in the daily running of the paper; Powell later claimed Marks had tried to sell his interest in the paper to a German agent in 1915, but it is unclear how accurate this claim was.

Marks died on 21 December 1916, due to complications arising from diabetes; he had been in poor health since his stroke seven years earlier. His wife Annie had died earlier in the year; he was survived by a son and a daughter, to whom he left an estate valued at £31,000.

== Notes ==
Parliament of the United Kingdom
Preceded by John Benn	Member of Parliament for St George; 1895–1900	Succeeded by Thomas Dewar
Preceded by James Lowther	Member of Parliament for Isle of Thanet; 1904–1910	Succeeded by Norman Carlyle Craig
