= Esmond Harmsworth, 2nd Viscount Rothermere =

British politician and publisher (1898–1978)

The Right Honourable The Viscount Rothermere
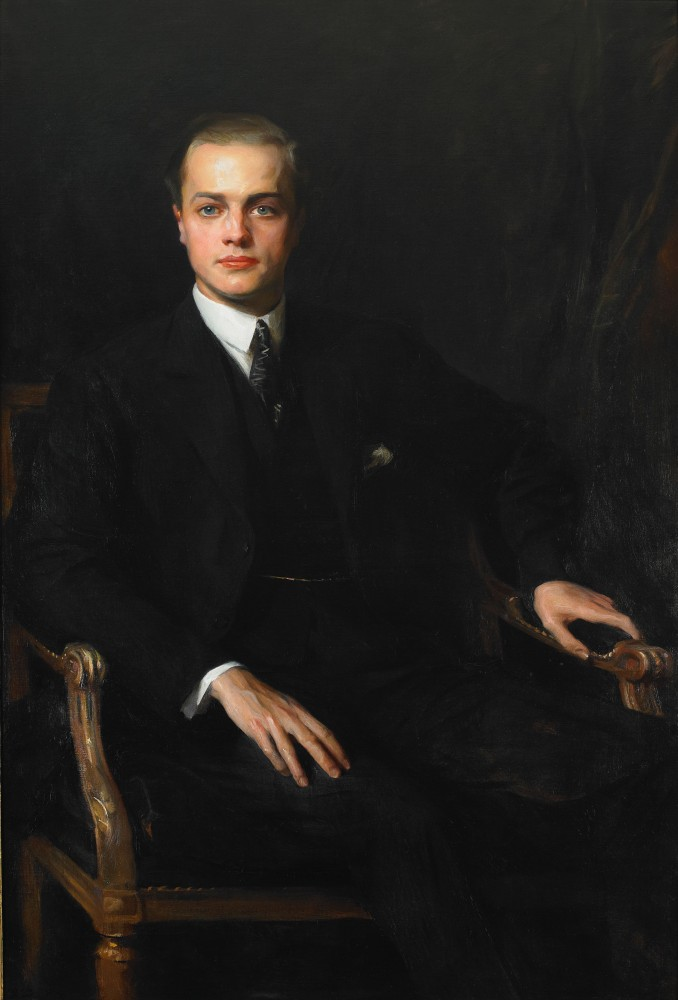
- 1923 portrait

Member of the House of Lords
- Lord Temporal
- In office 26 November 1940 – 12 July 1978
- Preceded by: Harold Harmsworth, 1st Viscount Rothermere
- Succeeded by: Vere Harmsworth, 3rd Viscount Rothermere

Member of Parliament for Isle of Thanet
- In office 15 November 1919 – 10 May 1929
- Preceded by: Norman Craig
- Succeeded by: Harold Balfour

Chairman of Daily Mail and General Trust
- 2nd Chairman
- In office 1929–1978
- Preceded by: Harold Harmsworth, 1st Viscount Rothermere
- Succeeded by: Vere Harmsworth, 3rd Viscount Rothermere

Chancellor of Memorial University of Newfoundland
- Inaugural Chancellor
- In office 1952–1961
- Succeeded by: Roy Thomson, 1st Baron Thomson of Fleet

Personal details
- Born: 29 May 1898
- Died: 12 July 1978 (aged 80)
- Party: Conservative
- Spouses: Margaret Hunam Redhead (m. 1920; div. 1938) Ann Geraldine Mary Charteris (m. 1945; div. 1952) Mary Murchison (m. 1966)
- Children: 4, including Vere Harmsworth, 3rd Viscount Rothermere
- Parent(s): Harold Harmsworth, 1st Viscount Rothermere; Mary Lilian Share
- Education: Eton College
- Occupation: Politician, publisher

Esmond Cecil Harmsworth, 2nd Viscount Rothermere (29 May 1898 – 12 July 1978), was a British Conservative politician and media magnate, the 2nd Chairman of the global media conglomerate Daily Mail and General Trust.

== Early life ==
Harmsworth was the third son of Harold Harmsworth, 1st Viscount Rothermere, who had founded the Daily Mail in partnership with his brother Alfred Harmsworth, 1st Viscount Northcliffe. He was educated at Eton College and commissioned into the Royal Marine Artillery in World War I. His two older brothers were both killed in action. Esmond served as aide-de-camp to the prime minister at the Paris Peace Conference. In 1919, he was elected as a Unionist Member of Parliament for the Isle of Thanet, one of the youngest MPs ever. He served until 1929.

== Press career ==
After 1922, the Daily Mail and General Trust company was created to control the newspapers that Lord Rothermere retained after Lord Northcliffe's death (The Times, for example, was sold). As his father dabbled in association with the Nazis and a flirtation with becoming King of Hungary, it fell to Harmsworth to manage the businesses. His father retired as chairman of Associated Newspapers in 1932 at the age of 64, and Harmsworth took over that role. He served as chairman until 1971, after which he assumed the titles of president and director of group finance, and chairman of Daily Mail & General Trust Ltd, the parent company, from 1938 until his death.

He became a director of The Rank Organisation in 1962. Harmsworth also had a significant impact on the development of Memorial University of Newfoundland (the family has had a long-standing interest in Newfoundland, having built a paper mill in Grand Falls before the outbreak of the First World War). The university's first residence in Paton College, known as Rothermere House, is named after the Viscount. Harmsworth was the first Chancellor of Memorial University and the benefactor who provided the funds to construct Rothermere House.

== Personal life and death ==
Lord Rothermere succeeded his father in the viscountcy in 1940. He married three times and had four children. His first marriage was to Margaret Hunnam Redhead (1897-1991), daughter of William Lancelot Redhead of Carville Hall, Brentford, on 12 January 1920 (divorced 1938). They had three children:

- Lorna Peggy Vyvyan Harmsworth (1920–2014), who married Neill Cooper-Key MP (1907–1981), and had issue, two sons and two daughters; her younger and only surviving son was the first husband of Lady Mary-Gaye Curzon (mother by later marriages of actress Isabella Calthorpe and society beauty Cressida Bonas).
- Esmé Mary Gabrielle Harmsworth (1922–2011), who married Rowland Baring, Viscount Errington (later 3rd Earl of Cromer), and had issue, two sons and one daughter, before his death in 1991. In 1993, she married secondly, to Captain Reinier Gerrit Anton van der Woude, whose first wife had been Lady Penelope Herbert (1925–1990), a daughter of the 6th Earl of Carnarvon.
- Vere Harmsworth, 3rd Viscount Rothermere (1925–1998)

He married, secondly, Ann Geraldine Mary O'Neill (née Charteris), widow of Shane O'Neill, 3rd Baron O'Neill, who had been killed in action in 1944 in Italy. She was the daughter of Captain Guy Lawrence Charteris (second son of the 11th Earl of Wemyss) and Frances Lucy Tennant. They married on 28 June 1945 and divorced in 1952. She then married writer Ian Fleming in 1952.

Lord Rothermere married, thirdly, Mary Murchison, daughter of Kenneth Murchison, on 28 March 1966, by whom he had a second son:

- Esmond Vyvyan Harmsworth (1967–2025), who moved to Cambridge, Massachusetts, in 1993. He died in April 2025 while on holiday in Mauritius. He was 57.

Lord Rothermere died on 12 July 1978, aged 80, and was succeeded by his elder son, Vere Harmsworth.

== The Rothemere Foundation ==
The Rothermere Foundation is a British charitable foundation established in 02 January 1964 by the Rothermeres 3 years after Lord Rothermere finished his inaugural chancellorship at Memorial University of Newfoundland. Its governing documents identify its principal purpose as enabling graduates of Memorial University of Newfoundland to pursue postgraduate study in the United Kingdom through the Rothermere Fellowships.

Today, the Foundation is chaired by Jonathan Harmsworth, 4th Viscount Rothermere, Esmond’s grandson, with other family members—including his son, great-grandson, and additional relatives—serving as trustees.

Beyond Memorial University, the Foundation also supports institutions such as the University of Oxford—including the Rothermere American Institute and the Vyvyan Harmsworth Professorship of American History—and Duke University, among other charitable and educational causes.

In 2005, Jonathan Harmsworth and Major Vyvyan Harmsworth (Esmond’s son) returned to Memorial University, where they met with university leaders and Rothermere Fellows. Their visit led to the creation of the Rothermere Harlow Travel Bursaries, funding Memorial University students to study at the University's Harlow Campus in England.

Parliament of the United Kingdom
Preceded by Norman Craig	Member of Parliament for Isle of Thanet; 1919–1929	Succeeded by Harold Balfour
Preceded by Joseph Sweeney	Baby of the House; 1919–1922	Succeeded by Arthur Evans
Academic offices
New creation	Chancellor of Memorial University of Newfoundland; 1952–1961	Succeeded by The Lord Thomson of Fleet
Peerage of the United Kingdom
Preceded by Harold Harmsworth	Viscount Rothermere; 1940–1978; Member of the House of Lords (1940–1978)	Succeeded by Vere Harmsworth
Preceded by Harold Harmsworth	Baron Rothermere; 1940–1978	Succeeded by Vere Harmsworth
Baronetage of the United Kingdom
Preceded by Harold Harmsworth	Baronet of Horsey; 1940–1978	Succeeded by Vere Harmsworth
