= East Thanet =

UK Parliament constituency (1974–1983, 2024 onwards)

Coordinates: 51.36°N 1.42°E

- Borough constituency for the House of Commons
- Interactive map of boundaries from 2024
- Boundary of East Thanet in South East England
- County: Kent
- Electorate: 73,790 (2023)
- Major settlements: Margate; Ramsgate; Broadstairs

Current constituency
- Created: 2024
- Member of Parliament: Polly Billington (Labour)
- Seats: One
- Created from: South Thanet; North Thanet

February 1974–1983 (Note: As Thanet East)
- Seats: One
- Created from: Isle of Thanet
- Replaced by: South Thanet

East Thanet is a British parliamentary constituency in the Isle of Thanet in Kent, represented since 2024 by Polly Billington of the Labour Party. The seat previously existed under the name Thanet East, from 1974 to 1983, returning one Member of Parliament (MP) to the House of Commons of the Parliament of the United Kingdom. Further to the completion of the 2023 review of Westminster constituencies, it was re-established as East Thanet for the 2024 general election. It is primarily the successor to the former South Thanet parliamentary constituency.

== Constituency profile ==
The East Thanet constituency is located at the easternmost point of Kent, occupying the Isle of Thanet peninsula. It contains the connected towns of Margate, Broadstairs and Ramsgate. The three towns are popular seaside resorts with large tourism sectors, although like many English coastal towns, they experienced economic decline during the late 20th century. High levels of deprivation are present, particularly in Margate and Ramsgate where many areas fall within the top 10% most-deprived areas in England. Broadstairs is comparatively wealthier. Average house prices in the constituency are lower than the national average.

Compared to the rest of the country, residents are generally older and have low levels of education. Household income is low and residents are less likely to work in professional occupations. White people made up 92% of the population at the 2021 census. At the local district council, Ramsgate and Margate are mostly represented by the Labour Party whilst more Conservative councillors were elected in Broadstairs. At the county council, which held elections more recently, all wards in East Thanet elected Reform UK councillors. Voters in East Thanet strongly supported leaving the European Union in the 2016 referendum; an estimated 64% voted in favour of Brexit compared to 52% nationwide.

== Boundaries ==
=== 1974–1983 (Thanet East) ===
The Borough of Ramsgate, and the Urban District of Broadstairs and St Peter's.

=== 2024–present (East Thanet) ===
Following the 2023 review of Westminster constituencies, which came into effect for the 2024 general election, the constituency is composed of the District of Thanet wards of Beacon Road, Bradstowe, Central Harbour, Cliffsend & Pegwell, Cliftonville East, Cliftonville West, Dane Valley, Eastcliff, Kingsgate, Margate Central, Nethercourt, Newington, Northwood, St Peters, Salmestone, Sir Moses Montefiore, and Viking.

It comprises those parts of the former constituency of South Thanet in the District of Thanet (85.6% of the electorate), together with three wards from North Thanet, including Central Margate.

== History ==
The constituency was created for the February 1974 general election, when the former constituency of Isle of Thanet was split in two, and returned one Member of Parliament (MP) to the House of Commons of the Parliament of the United Kingdom. It was abolished for the 1983 general election, when Thanet East and the neighbouring Thanet West constituency were replaced by new North Thanet and South Thanet constituencies.

The constituency name was revived at the 2024 general election, where it effectively replaced the South Thanet constituency, with 81.8% of the electorate of the former South Thanet seat becoming part of the new East Thanet, and 85.6% of the new East Thanet seat having previously belonged to the former South Thanet.

== Members of Parliament ==
=== MPs 1974–1983 ===
Isle of Thanet prior to 1974

| Election | Member | Party |
|---|---|---|
| Feb 1974 | Jonathan Aitken | Conservative |
| 1983 | constituency abolished | |

=== MPs since 2024 ===
South Thanet prior to 2024

| Election | Member | Party |
|---|---|---|
| 2024 | Polly Billington | Labour |

== Elections ==
=== Elections in the 2020s ===
General election 2024: East Thanet
| Party | Candidate | Votes | % | ±% |
|---|---|---|---|---|
| Labour | Polly Billington | 17,054 | 39.9 | ▲2.3 |
| Conservative | Helen Harrison | 10,083 | 23.6 | ▼29.9 |
| Reform UK | Paul Webb | 8,591 | 20.1 | New |
| Green | Steve Roberts | 4,590 | 10.7 | ▲7.0 |
| Liberal Democrats | Jai Singh | 1,365 | 3.2 | ▼2.0 |
| Independent | Grahame Birchall | 563 | 1.3 | New |
| Independent | Paul Holton | 369 | 0.9 | New |
| Independent | Mo Shafaei | 98 | 0.2 | New |
| Majority | | 6,971 | 16.3 | N/A |
| Turnout | | 42,713 | 57.0 | ▼7.9 |
| Registered electors | | 74,940 | | |
| Labour gain from Conservative | | Swing | ▲16.1 | |

=== Elections in the 2010s ===
2019 notional result
| Party | Vote | % |
|---|---|---|
| Conservative | 25,616 | 53.5 |
| Labour | 18,031 | 37.6 |
| Liberal Democrats | 2,486 | 5.2 |
| Green | 1,791 | 3.7 |
| Turnout | 47,924 | 64.9 |
| Electorate | 73,790 | |

== Election results 1974–1983 ==
=== Elections in the 1970s ===
General election 1979: Thanet East
| Party | Candidate | Votes | % | ±% |
|---|---|---|---|---|
| Conservative | Jonathan Aitken | 20,367 | 57.17 | +11.1 |
| Labour | I Kilberry | 10,128 | 28.43 | −4.6 |
| Liberal | B Hesketh | 4,755 | 13.35 | −5.6 |
| National Front | B Dobing | 376 | 1.06 | −1.0 |
| Majority | | 10,239 | 28.74 | +15.6 |
| Turnout | | 35,625 | 72.72 | +1.2 |
| Conservative hold | | Swing | | |

General election October 1974: Thanet East
| Party | Candidate | Votes | % | ±% |
|---|---|---|---|---|
| Conservative | Jonathan Aitken | 15,813 | 46.10 | −0.8 |
| Labour | S Bartlett | 11,310 | 32.97 | +0.4 |
| Liberal | C Hogarth | 6,472 | 18.87 | −4.6 |
| National Front | K Munson | 708 | 2.06 | New |
| Majority | | 4,503 | 13.13 | −4.1 |
| Turnout | | 34,302 | 71.55 | −9.0 |
| Conservative hold | | Swing | | |

General election February 1974: Thanet East
| Party | Candidate | Votes | % | ±% |
|---|---|---|---|---|
| Conservative | Jonathan Aitken | 17,944 | 46.86 | |
| Labour | Robert Bean | 11,347 | 29.64 | |
| Liberal | J Cox | 8,997 | 23.50 | |
| Majority | | 6,597 | 17.22 | |
| Turnout | | 38,289 | 80.53 | |
| Conservative win (new seat) | | | | |

== See also ==
- Parliamentary constituencies in Kent
- List of parliamentary constituencies in the South East England (region)
