= Thanet West =

UK Parliament constituency (1974–1983)

Coordinates: 51°22′N 1°22′E

- Former borough constituency for the House of Commons
- Thanet West in Kent, showing boundaries used from 1974–1983
- County: Kent
- Major settlements: Margate

February 1974–1983
- Seats: One
- Created from: Isle of Thanet
- Replaced by: Thanet North and Thanet South

Thanet West was a British parliamentary constituency in the Isle of Thanet, in Kent.

It was created for the February 1974 general election, when the former constituency of Isle of Thanet was split in two, and returned one Member of Parliament (MP) to the House of Commons of the Parliament of the United Kingdom. It was abolished for the 1983 general election, when Thanet West and the neighbouring Thanet East constituency were replaced by new North Thanet and South Thanet constituencies.

== Boundaries ==
The Borough of Margate, and in the Rural District of Eastry the parishes of Acol, Minster, Monkton, St Nicholas at Wade, and Sarre.

== Members of Parliament ==
Election	Member	Party
Feb 1974	William Rees-Davies	Conservative
1983	constituency abolished	

== Election results ==
=== Elections in the 1970s ===
General election 1979: Thanet West
Party	Candidate	Votes	%	±%
Conservative	William Rees-Davies	18,122	55.39	+10.1
Labour	J. F. Little	8,576	26.21	−2.3
Liberal	D. Payne	6,017	18.39	−7.7
Majority		9,546	29.18	+12.4
Turnout		32,715	71.60	+2.5
Conservative hold		Swing		

General election October 1974: Thanet West
Party	Candidate	Votes	%	±%
Conservative	William Rees-Davies	13,763	45.34	−4.2
Labour	C. J. Smith	8,655	28.51	+5.1
Liberal	I. G. Tiltman	7,935	26.14	−1.0
Majority		5,108	16.83	−5.7
Turnout		30,353	69.14	−9.0
Conservative hold		Swing		

General election February 1974: Thanet West
Party	Candidate	Votes	%	±%
Conservative	William Rees-Davies	16,880	49.55	
Liberal	I. G. Tiltman	9,220	27.06	
Labour	D. Ramage	7,969	23.39	
Majority		7,660	22.49	
Turnout		34,069	78.09	
Conservative win (new seat)				
