= Isle of Thanet (constituency) =

Parliamentary constituency in the United Kingdom, 1885–1974

- Former county constituency for the House of Commons
- Isle of Thanet in Kent, showing boundaries used from 1955–1974

1885–February 1974
- Seats: one
- Created from: East Kent
- Replaced by: Thanet East, Thanet West

Isle of Thanet was a county constituency which returned one Member of Parliament (MP) to the House of Commons of the Parliament of the United Kingdom from 1885, until it was abolished for the February 1974 general election.

It was located on the Isle of Thanet, in Kent.

== Boundaries ==
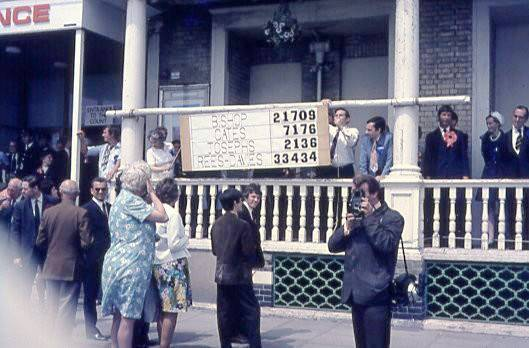
Declaration of results for the 1970 general election at Granville House, Ramsgate

1918–1950: The Boroughs of Margate, Ramsgate, and Sandwich, the Urban District of Broadstairs and St Peters, and the Rural District of Isle of Thanet.

1950–1974: The Boroughs of Margate and Ramsgate, the Urban District of Broadstairs and St Peters, and in the Rural District of Eastry the parishes of Acol, Minster, Monkton, St Nicholas at Wade, and Sarre.

== Members of Parliament ==
Year	Member	Party
1885	Edward King-Harman	Conservative
1888	James Lowther	Conservative
1904	Harry Marks	Conservative
1910	Norman Craig	Conservative
1919	Esmond Harmsworth	Unionist
1929	Harold Balfour	Unionist
1945	Edward Carson	Conservative
1953	William Rees-Davies	Conservative
1974	constituency abolished	

== Election results ==
=== Elections in the 1880s ===
General election 1885: Isle of Thanet
Party	Candidate	Votes	%	±%
Conservative	Edward King-Harman	3,381	55.9	
Liberal	Edmund Francis Davies	2,670	44.1	
Majority		711	11.8	
Turnout		6,051	76.2	
Registered electors		7,941		
Conservative win (new seat)				

General election 1886: Isle of Thanet
Party	Candidate	Votes	%	±%
Conservative	Edward King-Harman	3,399	72.2	+16.3
Liberal	Edward Gripper Banks	1,311	27.8	−16.3
Majority		2,088	44.4	+32.6
Turnout		4,710	59.3	−16.9
Registered electors		7,941		
Conservative hold		Swing	+16.3	

King-Harman's death caused a by-election.

By-election, 29 Jun 1888: Isle of Thanet
Party	Candidate	Votes	%	±%
Conservative	James Lowther	3,547	55.1	−17.1
Liberal	Edward Knatchbull-Hugessen	2,889	44.9	+17.1
Majority		658	10.2	−34.2
Turnout		6,436	78.2	+18.9
Registered electors		8,228		
Conservative hold		Swing	−17.1	

=== Elections in the 1890s ===
General election 1892: Isle of Thanet
Party	Candidate	Votes	%	±%
Conservative	James Lowther	3,901	57.7	−14.5
Liberal	Heber Hart	2,857	42.3	+14.5
Majority		1,044	15.4	−29.0
Turnout		6,758	68.2	+8.9
Registered electors		9,913		
Conservative hold		Swing	−14.5	

General election 1895: Isle of Thanet
Party	Candidate	Votes	%	±%
Conservative	James Lowther	Unopposed		
Conservative hold				

=== Elections in the 1900s ===
General election 1900: Isle of Thanet
Party	Candidate	Votes	%	±%
Conservative	James Lowther	Unopposed		
Conservative hold				

1904 Isle of Thanet by-election
Party	Candidate	Votes	%	±%
Conservative	Harry Marks	4,048	52.5	N/A
Liberal	Joseph King	3,666	47.5	New
Majority		382	5.0	N/A
Turnout		7,714	71.3	N/A
Registered electors		10,823		
Conservative hold		Swing	N/A	

General election 1906: Isle of Thanet
Party	Candidate	Votes	%	±%
Conservative	Harry Marks	5,154	51.3	N/A
Liberal	Joseph King	3,961	39.5	N/A
Ind. Conservative	Frederick E McCormick Goodhart	925	9.2	New
Majority		1,193	11.8	N/A
Turnout		10,040	84.4	N/A
Registered electors		11,891		
Conservative hold		Swing	N/A	

=== Elections in the 1910s ===
General Election January 1910: Isle of Thanet
Party	Candidate	Votes	%	±%
Conservative	Norman Craig	6,892	66.9	+15.6
Liberal	Julian William Wellesley Weigall	3,410	33.1	−6.4
Majority		3,482	33.8	+22.0
Turnout		10,302	81.8	−2.6
Registered electors		12,588		
Conservative hold		Swing	+11.0	

General election December 1910: Isle of Thanet
Party	Candidate	Votes	%	±%
Conservative	Norman Craig	Unopposed		
Conservative hold				

General Election 1914–15:

Another General Election was required to take place before the end of 1915. The political parties had been making preparations for an election to take place and by July 1914, the following candidates had been selected;

- Unionist: Norman Craig
- Liberal:

General Election 1918: Isle of Thanet
Party		Candidate	Votes	%	±%
C	Unionist	Norman Craig	Unopposed		
	Unionist hold				
C indicates candidate endorsed by the coalition government.

1919 Isle of Thanet by-election
Party	Candidate	Votes	%	±%
Unionist	Esmond Harmsworth	9,711	57.9	N/A
Liberal	William J. West	7,058	42.1	New
Majority		2,653	15.8	N/A
Turnout		16,769	52.8	N/A
Registered electors		31,767		
Unionist hold		Swing	N/A	

=== Elections in the 1920s ===
1922 general election: Isle of Thanet
Party	Candidate	Votes	%	±%
Unionist	Esmond Harmsworth	16,116	61.2	N/A
Liberal	Alfred Suenson-Taylor	10,226	38.8	N/A
Majority		5,890	22.4	N/A
Turnout		26,342	68.4	N/A
Registered electors		38,500		
Unionist hold		Swing	N/A	

General election 1923: Isle of Thanet
Party	Candidate	Votes	%	±%
Unionist	Esmond Harmsworth	13,821	50.1	−11.1
Liberal	Reginald Rait	13,773	49.9	+11.1
Majority		48	0.2	−22.2
Turnout		27,594	69.5	+1.1
Registered electors		39,679		
Unionist hold		Swing	−11.1	

General election 1924: Isle of Thanet
Party	Candidate	Votes	%	±%
Unionist	Esmond Harmsworth	21,130	65.8	+15.7
Liberal	Arthur Luxmoore	6,779	21.1	−28.8
Labour	Dudley Aman	4,202	13.1	New
Majority		14,351	44.7	+44.5
Turnout		32,111	77.6	+8.1
Registered electors		41,395		
Unionist hold		Swing	+22.3	

General election 1929: Isle of Thanet
Party	Candidate	Votes	%	±%
Unionist	Harold Balfour	22,595	52.9	−12.9
Liberal	Alfred Suenson-Taylor	15,648	36.6	+15.5
Labour	Edgar Joseph Plaisted	4,490	10.5	−2.6
Majority		6,947	16.3	−28.4
Turnout		42,733	73.3	−4.3
Registered electors		58,330		
Unionist hold		Swing	−14.2	

=== Elections in the 1930s ===
General election 1931: Isle of Thanet
Party	Candidate	Votes	%	±%
Conservative	Harold Balfour	33,173	74.2	+21.3
Liberal	George Ivor Phillips	11,517	25.8	−10.8
Majority		21,656	48.4	+32.1
Turnout		44,690	73.6	+0.3
Conservative hold		Swing		

General election 1935: Isle of Thanet
Party	Candidate	Votes	%	±%
Conservative	Harold Balfour	Unopposed		
Conservative hold				

General Election 1939–40

Another General Election was required to take place before the end of 1940. The political parties had been making preparations for an election to take place and by the Autumn of 1939, the following candidates had been selected;

- Conservative: Harold Balfour
- Liberal: Richard Pope-Hennessy
- Labour: FW Mellanby

=== Elections in the 1940s ===
General election 1945: Isle of Thanet
Party	Candidate	Votes	%	±%
Conservative	Edward Carson	15,023	48.7	N/A
Labour	Thomas Boyd	12,075	39.2	New
Liberal	Philip John Willmett	3,732	12.1	New
Majority		2,948	9.5	N/A
Turnout		30,830	69.2	N/A
Conservative hold		Swing	N/A	

=== Elections in the 1950s ===
General election 1950: Isle of Thanet
Party	Candidate	Votes	%	±%
Conservative	Edward Carson	31,345	55.5	+6.8
Labour	Christopher Boyd	20,522	36.4	−2.8
Liberal	Charles Wrong	4,561	8.1	−4.0
Majority		10,823	19.1	+9.6
Turnout		56,431	83.0	+13.8
Conservative hold		Swing		

General election 1951: Isle of Thanet
Party	Candidate	Votes	%	±%
Conservative	Edward Carson	33,551	61.6	+6.1
Labour	Otto Shaw	20,892	38.4	+2.0
Majority		12,659	23.2	+4.1
Turnout		54,444	78.0	−5.0
Conservative hold		Swing		

1953 Isle of Thanet by-election
Party	Candidate	Votes	%	±%
Conservative	William Rees-Davies	25,261	61.3	−0.3
Labour	Frank Woodbridge	15,935	38.7	+0.3
Majority		9,326	22.6	−0.6
Turnout		41,196	58.7	−19.3
Conservative hold		Swing		

General election 1955: Isle of Thanet
Party	Candidate	Votes	%	±%
Conservative	William Rees-Davies	31,270	62.2	+0.6
Labour	Kingston Jones	18,981	37.8	−0.6
Majority		12,289	24.4	+1.2
Turnout		50,251	71.9	−6.1
Conservative hold		Swing		

General election 1959: Isle of Thanet
Party	Candidate	Votes	%	±%
Conservative	William Rees-Davies	29,453	54.5	−7.7
Labour	Henry Fountain	17,555	32.5	−5.3
Liberal	George MacDonald-Jones	6,998	13.0	New
Majority		11,898	22.0	−2.4
Turnout		54,007	75.1	+3.2
Conservative hold		Swing		

=== Elections in the 1960s ===
General election 1964: Isle of Thanet
Party	Candidate	Votes	%	±%
Conservative	William Rees-Davies	27,870	47.7	−6.8
Labour	Ernest Wistrich	20,520	35.2	+2.7
Liberal	David Norrington	9,979	17.1	+4.1
Majority		7,350	12.5	−9.5
Turnout		58,369	74.2	−0.9
Conservative hold		Swing		

General election 1966: Isle of Thanet
Party	Candidate	Votes	%	±%
Conservative	William Rees-Davies	29,302	47.5	−0.2
Labour	Leonard John A Bishop	24,416	39.6	+4.4
Liberal	Frederick G Redman	7,952	12.9	−4.2
Majority		4,886	7.9	−4.6
Turnout		61,670	75.7	+1.5
Conservative hold		Swing		

=== Elections in the 1970s ===
General election 1970: Isle of Thanet
Party	Candidate	Votes	%	±%
Conservative	William Rees-Davies	33,434	51.9	+4.4
Labour	Leonard John A Bishop	21,709	33.7	−5.9
Liberal	Tudor Gates	7,176	11.1	−1.8
Ind. Conservative	Ian Josephs	2,136	3.3	New
Majority		11,725	18.2	+10.3
Turnout		64,458	72.2	−3.5
Conservative hold		Swing		
