= Maurice Craig (psychiatrist) =

British psychiatrist

Sir Maurice Craig KBE FRCP (29 May 1866 – 6 January 1935) was a British psychiatrist and pioneer in the treatment of mental illness.

== Biography ==
Craig was born on 29 May 1866 and educated at Bedford School, Gonville and Caius College, Cambridge and at Guy's Hospital. He worked at the Bethlem Royal Hospital and, in 1908, was appointed as Physician for Psychological Medicine at Guy's Hospital.

During the First World War he became a lieutenant colonel in the Royal Army Medical Corps, carrying out work with men suffering from shell shock. He was appointed to the War Office Committee on Shell Shock.

Craig was psychiatrist to Virginia Woolf for twenty-two years, and to the future King Edward VIII.

In 1905, the first edition of his ground-breaking reference work Psychological Medicine: A Manual on Mental Diseases for Practitioners and Students was published and, in 1922, he founded the National Council for Mental Hygiene. In 1930, he was appointed Vice-Chairman of the International Committee for Mental Hygiene.

He married Edith de Saumarez Brock in 1903 at Saint Peter Port, Guernsey; they had one son and two daughters.

Sir Maurice Craig died on 6 January 1935.

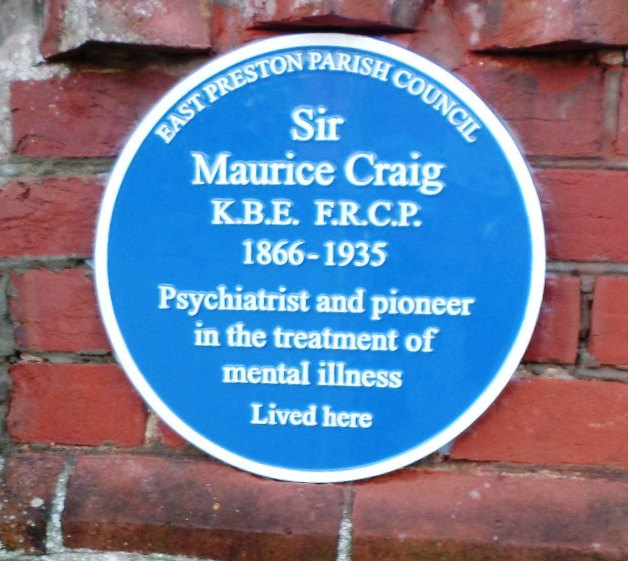
Blue plaque for Sir Maurice Craig. South Strand, East Preston, West Sussex, UK
