= Edward Knatchbull-Hugessen, 2nd Baron Brabourne =

British peer and Liberal Party politician

Edward Knatchbull-Hugessen, 2nd Baron Brabourne JP DL (5 April 1857 – 29 December 1909) was a British peer and Liberal Party politician.

== Background and education ==
Brabourne was born at Great Malvern, Worcestershire, the eldest son of Edward Knatchbull-Hugessen, 1st Baron Brabourne, and Anna Maria Elizabeth, daughter of Reverend Marcus Southwell. He was educated at Eton and Magdalen College, Oxford.

== Political career ==
Brabourne was returned to Parliament for Rochester in at a by-election April 1889, having unsuccessfully contested the Isle of Thanet at a by-election in June 1888. The Rochester by-election was caused by the resignation of the Conservative Francis Hughes-Hallett after a scandal. He held the Rochester seat until he stood down at the 1892 general election. In 1893 he succeeded his father in the barony and entered the House of Lords. Brabourne was also a lieutenant in the Coldstream Guards and served as deputy lieutenant and justice of the peace for Kent.

== Family ==
Lord Brabourne married Amy Virginia, daughter of Wentworth Beaumont, 1st Baron Allendale, in 1880. They had two sons (of whom the eldest died young) and two daughters. Brabourne died in London in December 1909, aged 52, and was succeeded in the barony by his only surviving son, Wyndham. Lady Brabourne remained a widow until her death in May 1949.

Parliament of the United Kingdom
Preceded by Francis Hughes-Hallett	Member of Parliament for Rochester; 1889–1892	Succeeded by Horatio Davies
Peerage of the United Kingdom
Preceded by Edward Knatchbull-Hugessen	Baron Brabourne; 1893–1909	Succeeded by Wyndham Knatchbull-Hugessen
