= South Thanet =

UK Parliament constituency (1983–2024)

Coordinates: 51°18′N 1°22′E

- Former county constituency for the House of Commons
- Boundary of South Thanet in Kent

- Location of Kent within England
- County: Kent
- Electorate: 67,970 (December 2010)
- Major settlements: Ramsgate, Broadstairs and Sandwich

1983–2024
- Seats: One
- Created from: Thanet West, Dover and Thanet East
- Replaced by: East Thanet

South Thanet was a constituency (Note: A county constituency (for the purposes of election expenses and type of returning officer)) in Kent. (Note: As with all constituencies, the constituency elects one Member of Parliament (MP) by the first past the post system of election at least every five years.)

The 2023 review of Westminster constituencies made moderate boundary changes to the constituency, which was renamed East Thanet, taking effect at the 2024 general election.

== Boundaries ==
Map of boundaries 2010–2024

1983–2010: The District of Thanet wards of Beacon Road, Bradstowe, Central Eastcliff, Central Westcliff, Kingsgate, Minster Parish, Newington, Northwood, Pierremont, St Lawrence, St Peter's, Sir Moses Montefiore, Southwood, and Upton, and the District of Dover wards of Ash, Little Stour, Sandwich, Woodnesborough with Staple, and Worth.

2010–2024: The District of Thanet wards of Beacon Road, Bradstowe, Central Harbour, Cliffsend and Pegwell, Cliftonville East, Cliftonville West, Eastcliff, Kingsgate, Nethercourt, Newington, Northwood, St Peter's, Sir Moses Montefiore, and Viking, and the District of Dover wards of Little Stour and Ashstone, and Sandwich.

South Thanet consisted of the southern and eastern part of Thanet district (the towns of Ramsgate and Broadstairs, the Cliftonville area of Margate and the village of Cliffsend) together with the northern part of Dover district, comprising the ancient Cinque Port of Sandwich and surrounding villages.

== Members of Parliament ==
Election	Member	Party
1983	Jonathan Aitken	Conservative
1997	Stephen Ladyman	Labour
2010	Laura Sandys	Conservative
2015	Craig Mackinlay	Conservative
2024	constituency abolished	

== Electoral spending criminal investigation following the 2015 general election ==
In 2016 an investigation by Channel 4 News revealed that the Conservative Party had spent many thousands of pounds centrally on battlebuses to transport activists, and hotel accommodation for the activists, who went to campaign in marginal constituencies, including South Thanet. The expenditure on the buses was declared by the Conservative Party on its national declaration of "Campaign Spending", but in some cases the hotel accommodation was not declared at all as election spending when it should have been. In addition, there is controversy about whether the expenditure, both on the buses and the accommodation, should have been declared on the declarations of expenditure for the constituency made by each candidate's election agent. Kent Police began an investigation into the spending returns of Craig Mackinlay following the Channel 4 report.

In a court case on 1 June 2016, brought against Mackinlay and his election agent Nathan Gray, District Judge Barron granted more time for investigation saying "In this case, the allegations are far-reaching and the consequences of a conviction would be of a local and national significance with the potential for election results being declared void."

On 14 March 2017, it was reported that Mackinlay had been interviewed under caution by officers investigating the allegations. On 2 June 2017, six days before the 2017 general election, Mackinlay and two Conservative party officials were charged by the Crown Prosecution Service with offences under the Representation of the People Act 1983. They were due to appear at Westminster Magistrates' Court on 4 July 2017.

On 9 January 2019, Mackinlay was cleared of election expenses fraud. One of the other defendants, Marion Little, was found guilty of two charges and given a nine-month suspended sentence and £5000 fine. She retained the OBE she had been awarded for political service in 2015.

== Elections ==
=== Elections in the 2010s ===
General election 2019: South Thanet
Party	Candidate	Votes	%	±%
Conservative	Craig Mackinlay	27,084	56.1	+5.3
Labour	Rebecca Gordon-Nesbitt	16,497	34.2	−3.7
Liberal Democrats	Martyn Pennington	2,727	5.7	+2.7
Green	Rebecca Wing	1,949	4.0	+2.4
Majority		10,587	21.9	+9.0
Turnout		48,257	65.8	−3.0
Conservative hold		Swing	+4.5	

General election 2017: South Thanet
Party	Candidate	Votes	%	±%
Conservative	Craig Mackinlay	25,262	50.8	+12.7
Labour	Raushan Ara	18,875	37.9	+14.1
UKIP	Stuart Piper	2,997	6.0	−26.4
Liberal Democrats	Jordan Williams	1,514	3.0	+1.1
Green	Trevor Roper	809	1.6	−0.6
Independent	Tim Garbutt	181	0.4	New
CPA	Faith Fisher	115	0.2	New
Majority		6,387	12.9	+7.2
Turnout		49,753	68.8	−1.6
Conservative hold		Swing	-0.8	

General election 2015: South Thanet
Party	Candidate	Votes	%	±%
Conservative	Craig Mackinlay	18,838	38.0	−9.9
UKIP	Nigel Farage	16,026	32.3	+26.8
Labour	Will Scobie	11,740	23.7	−7.7
Green	Ian Driver	1,076	2.2	New
Liberal Democrats	Russell Timpson	932	1.9	−13.2
No description^{1}	Al Murray	318	0.6	New
Manston Airport Independent	Ruth Bailey	191	0.4	New
We Are The Reality Party	Nigel Askew	126	0.3	New
Party for a United Thanet	Grahame Birchall	63	0.1	New
Independent	Dean McCastree	61	0.1	New
Al-Zebabist Nation of Ooog	Zebadiah Abu-Obadiah	30	0.05	New
Majority		2,812	5.7	−9.7
Turnout		49,564	69.8	+4.1
Conservative hold		Swing	−18.4	

^{1}: Murray appeared on the ballot paper without any description, but campaigned under the label of the Free United Kingdom Party (FUKP).

General election 2010: South Thanet
Party	Candidate	Votes	%	±%
Conservative	Laura Sandys	22,043	47.9	+6.8
Labour	Stephen Ladyman	14,426	31.3	−8.1
Liberal Democrats	Peter Bucklitsch	6,935	15.1	+2.9
UKIP	Trevor Shonk	2,529	5.5	+0.7
Majority		7,617	15.4	N/A
Turnout		46,023	65.3	+0.3
Conservative gain from Labour		Swing	+7.4	

=== Elections in the 2000s ===
General election 2005: South Thanet
Party	Candidate	Votes	%	±%
Labour	Stephen Ladyman	16,660	40.4	−5.3
Conservative	Mark MacGregor	15,996	38.8	−2.3
Liberal Democrats	Guy Voizey	5,431	13.2	+3.8
UKIP	Nigel Farage	2,079	5.0	+3.7
Green	Howard Green	888	2.2	New
Independent	Maude Kinsella	188	0.5	New
Majority		664	1.6	−3.0
Turnout		41,242	65.0	1.1
Labour hold		Swing	−1.5	

General election 2001: South Thanet
Party	Candidate	Votes	%	±%
Labour	Stephen Ladyman	18,002	45.7	−0.5
Conservative	Mark MacGregor	16,210	41.1	+1.3
Liberal Democrats	Guy Voizey	3,706	9.4	−2.3
Independent	William Baldwin	770	2.0	New
UKIP	Terry Eccott	502	1.3	New
National Front	Bernard Franklin	242	0.6	New
Majority		1,792	4.6	−1.8
Turnout		39,432	63.9	−7.7
Labour hold		Swing	−0.9	

=== Elections in the 1990s ===
General election 1997: South Thanet
Party	Candidate	Votes	%	±%
Labour	Stephen Ladyman	20,777	46.2	+18.1
Conservative	Jonathan Aitken	17,899	39.8	−11.9
Liberal Democrats	Barbara Hewitt-Silk	5,263	11.7	−6.6
Independent	C Crook	631	1.4	New
Green	David Wheatley	418	0.9	−0.9
Majority		2,878	6.4	N/A
Turnout		44,988	71.6	−6.6
Labour gain from Conservative		Swing	+15.4	

General election 1992: South Thanet
Party	Candidate	Votes	%	±%
Conservative	Jonathan Aitken	25,253	51.7	−2.6
Labour	Mark James	13,740	28.1	+7.2
Liberal Democrats	Bill Pitt	8,948	18.3	−6.5
Green	Sue Peckham	871	1.8	New
Majority		11,513	23.6	−5.9
Turnout		48,812	78.2	+4.5
Conservative hold		Swing	−4.9	

=== Elections in the 1980s ===
General election 1987: South Thanet
Party	Candidate	Votes	%	±%
Conservative	Jonathan Aitken	25,135	54.3	−2.2
Liberal	Bill Pitt	11,452	24.8	+0.7
Labour	Chris Wright	9,673	20.9	+1.5
Majority		13,683	29.5	−2.9
Turnout		46,260	73.7	+3.7
Conservative hold		Swing	−1.4	

General election 1983: South Thanet
Party	Candidate	Votes	%	±%
Conservative	Jonathan Aitken	24,512	56.5	
Liberal	Ian Josephs	10,461	24.1	
Labour	Martin Clark	8,429	19.4	
Majority		14,051	32.4	
Turnout		43,402	70.0	
Conservative win (new seat)				

== See also ==
- Parliamentary constituencies in Kent
