= Mackeson (disambiguation) =

Mackeson Stout is a beer.

Mackeson may also refer to:

- Rupert Mackeson, 2nd Baronet (born 1941), British author and former soldier
- Mackeson baronets, a title in the Baronetage of the United Kingdom

== See also ==
- Mackensen (disambiguation)
