= Princess Alexandra Victoria of Schleswig-Holstein-Sonderburg-Glücksburg =

Princess Alexandra Victoria
- Princess August Wilhelm of Prussia
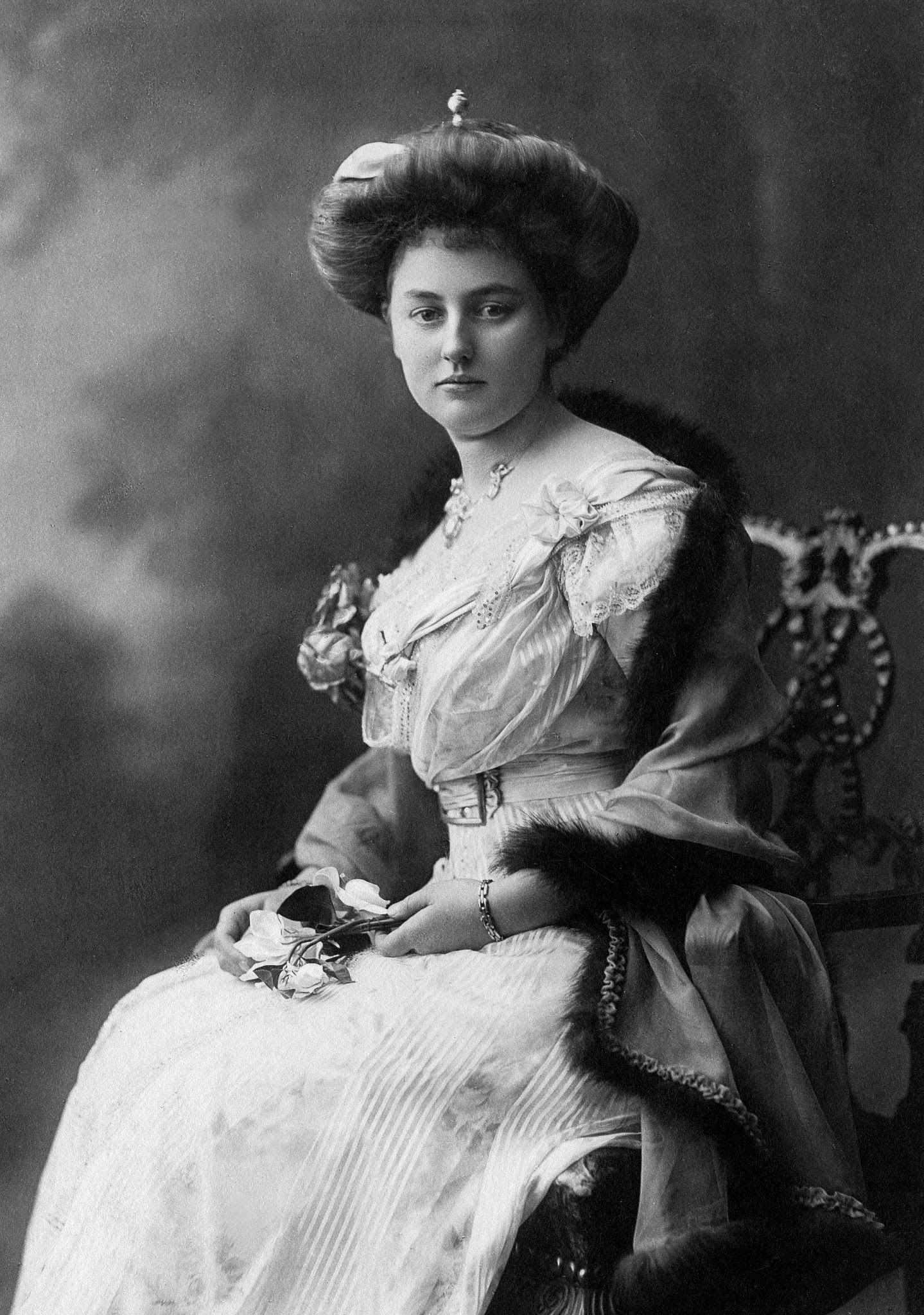
- Alexandra Victoria in 1910
- Born: 21 April 1887; Grünholz Castle, Schleswig-Holstein, Kingdom of Prussia, German Empire
- Died: 15 April 1957 (aged 69); Lyon, French Fourth Republic
- Spouse: Prince August Wilhelm of Prussia (m. 1908; div. 1920) Arnold Rümann (m. 1922; div. 1933)
- Issue: Prince Alexander Ferdinand
Names
- Alexandra Victoria Augusta Leopoldine Charlotte Amalie Wilhelmina; German: Alexandra Viktoria Auguste Leopoldine Charlotte Amalie Wilhelmine
- House: Glücksburg
- Father: Frederick Ferdinand, Duke of Schleswig-Holstein
- Mother: Princess Karoline Mathilde of Schleswig-Holstein-Sonderburg-Augustenburg

Princess Alexandra Victoria of Schleswig-Holstein-Sonderburg-Glücksburg (21 April 1887 – 15 April 1957) was the second-eldest child and daughter of Frederick Ferdinand, Duke of Schleswig-Holstein and his wife Princess Karoline Mathilde of Schleswig-Holstein-Sonderburg-Augustenburg.

== Early life ==
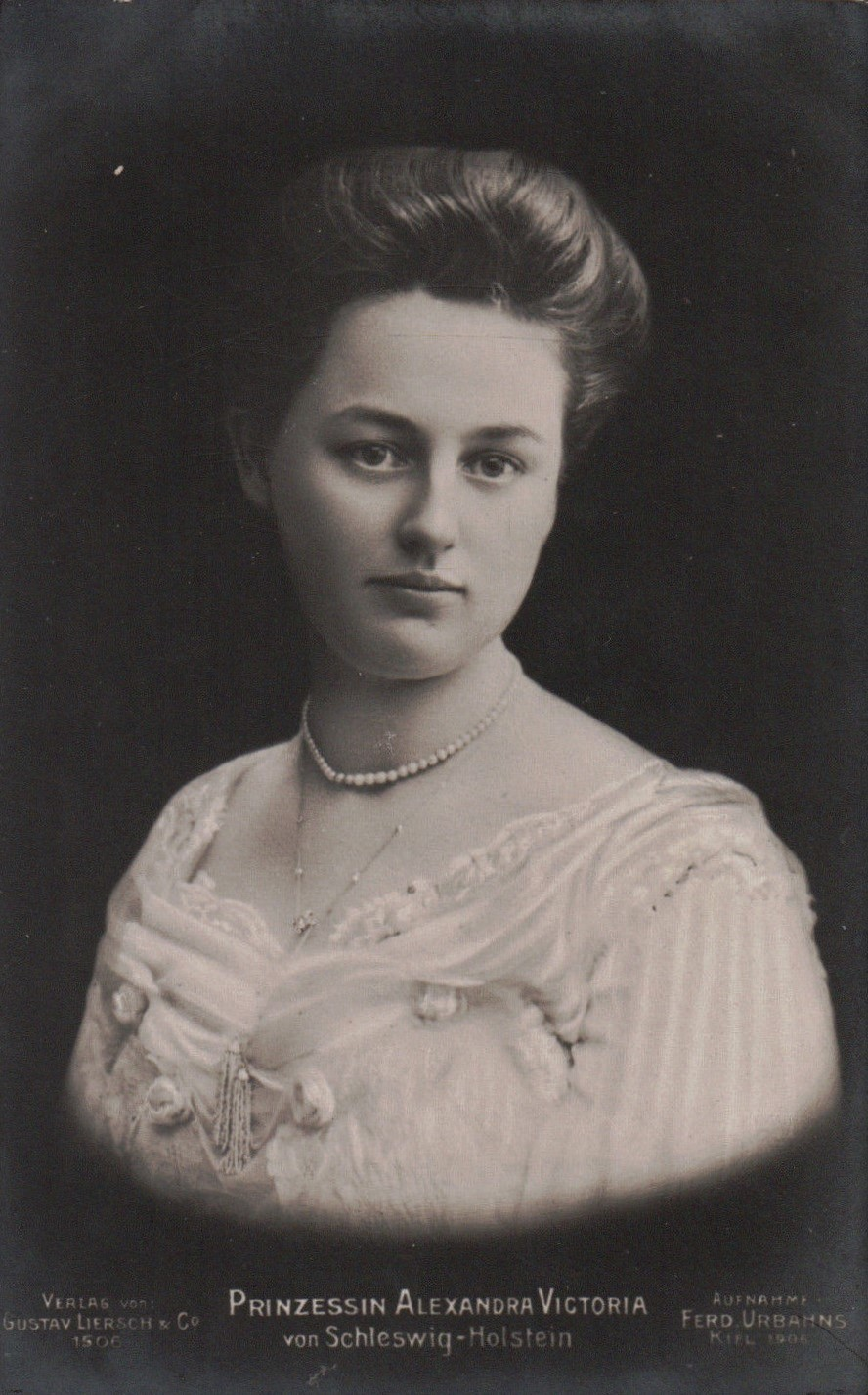
Alexandra Victoria of Schleswig-Holstein, 1906.

Princess Alexandra Victoria was born on 21 April 1887 at Grünholz Castle in Schleswig-Holstein, Prussia as the second-eldest child and daughter of Frederick Ferdinand, Duke of Schleswig-Holstein and his wife Princess Karoline Mathilde of Schleswig-Holstein-Sonderburg-Augustenburg, a great-niece of Queen Victoria.

By birth, she belonged to the Schleswig-Holstein-Sonderburg-Glücksburg line of the House of Oldenburg. Alexandra Victoria's father was the eldest son of Friedrich, Duke of Schleswig-Holstein-Sonderburg-Glücksburg and a nephew of Christian IX of Denmark. He had succeeded to the headship of the House of Schleswig-Holstein-Sonderburg-Glücksburg and the title of duke upon the death of his father in 1885.

== Marriages and issue ==
=== Prince August Wilhelm ===
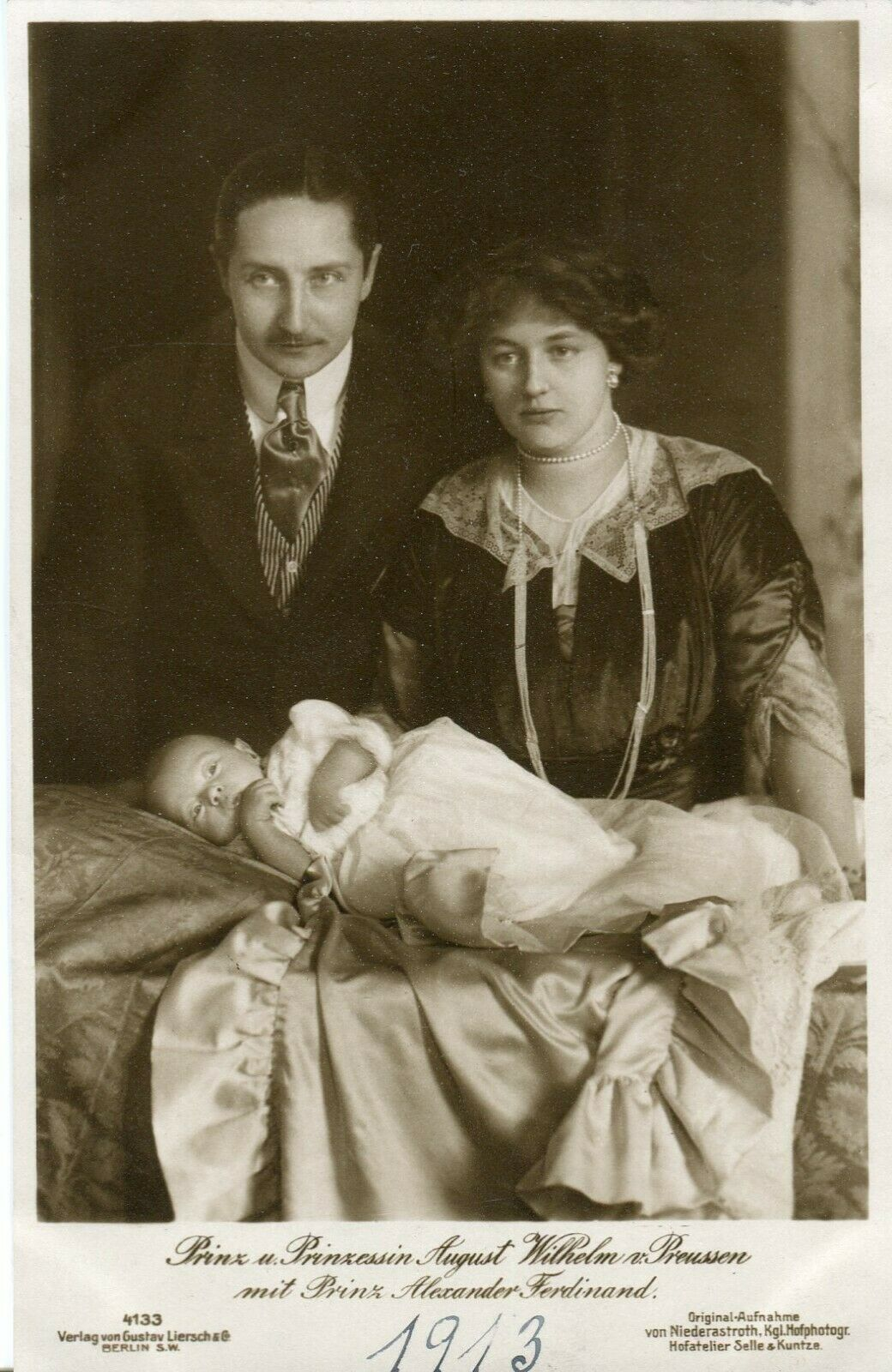
Alexandra Victoria with her first husband August Wilhelm and their only child Alexander Ferdinand, 1913.

Alexandra Victoria's first husband was her first cousin Prince August Wilhelm of Prussia, the son of Wilhelm II, German Emperor and his wife Augusta Victoria, a sister of Alexandra Victoria's mother.

They married on 22 October 1908 at the Royal Palace of Berlin. The marriage was arranged by the Emperor and Empress, but it was relatively happy. Alexandra was a great favorite of her mother-in-law, especially since the Empress was also her own aunt. A contemporary of the court, Princess Catherine Radziwill, commented that Alexandra "had always shown herself willing to listen to her mother-in-law. She is a nice girl - fair, fat, and a perfect type of the 'Deutsche Hausfrau' dear to the souls of German novel-writers". Another contemporary wrote that the marriage had been a love match, and that Alexandra was a "charmingly pretty, bright girl".

The couple had planned to take up residence in Schönhausen Palace in Berlin, but changed their mind when August Wilhelm's father decided to leave his son the Villa Liegnitz in the Sanssouci Park in Potsdam. Their residence developed into a meeting place for artists and scholars.

Alexandra Victoria and August Wilhelm had one son:

- Prince Alexander Ferdinand of Prussia (26 December 1912 – 12 June 1985)

During the First World War, August Wilhelm was made district administrator (Landrat) of the district of Ruppin; his office and residence was now Schloss Rheinsberg. His personal adjutant Hans Georg von Mackensen, with whom he had been close friends since his youth, played an important role in his life. These "pronounced homophilic tendencies" contributed to the failure of his marriage to Princess Alexandra Victoria. They never undertook a formal divorce due to the opposition of August Wilhelm's father, Kaiser Wilhelm II.

After the fall of the German monarchy in 1918, the couple divorced on 16 March 1920.

=== Arnold Rümann ===
Her second husband was Arnold Rümann, whom she married on 7 January 1922 at Grünholz Castle. In 1926, Alexandra moved for a time to New York City, where she worked as a painter. She and Arnold were divorced in 1933.

== Later life ==
After World War II, Alexandra lived in a trailer near Wiesbaden, where she earned a living as a portrait and landscape painter. She died on 14 April 1957 in a hotel in Lyon, France. Her body was buried in a family mausoleum in Louisenlund, Schleswig-Holstein, Germany.

== Ancestry ==
Ancestors of Princess Alexandra Victoria of Schleswig-Holstein-Sonderburg-Glücksburg

8. Frederick William, Duke of Schleswig-Holstein-Sonderburg-Glücksburg
4. Friedrich, Duke of Schleswig-Holstein-Sonderburg-Glücksburg
9. Princess Louise Caroline of Hesse-Kassel
2. Friedrich Ferdinand, Duke of Schleswig-Holstein
10. George William, Prince of Schaumburg-Lippe
5. Princess Adelheid of Schaumburg-Lippe
11. Princess Ida of Waldeck and Pyrmont
1. Princess Alexandra Victoria of Schleswig-Holstein-Sonderburg-Glücksburg
12. Christian August II, Duke of Schleswig-Holstein-Sonderburg-Augustenburg
6. Frederick VIII, Duke of Schleswig-Holstein
13. Countess Louise Sophie Danneskiold-Samsøe
3. Princess Karoline Mathilde of Schleswig-Holstein-Sonderburg-Augustenburg
14. Ernst I, Prince of Hohenlohe-Langenburg
7. Princess Adelheid of Hohenlohe-Langenburg
15. Princess Feodora of Leiningen

== Sources ==
- Kidd, Charles; Williamson, David, eds. (2003). "The Descendants of Queen Victoria". Debrett's Peerage and Baronetage (144th ed.). London: Debrett's Peerage Limited and Pan Macmillan. pp. 85–118. ISBN 0-333-660935.
- Louda, Jiří; Maclagan, Michael (1999). Lines of Succession: Heraldry of the Royal Families of Europe. London: Little, Brown and Company. ISBN 978-1-85605-469-0 – via Internet Archive.
- Radziwill, Catherine (1915). The Royal Marriage Market of Europe. New York: Funk and Wagnalls Company. ISBN 1-112-56551-5.
- Schwering, Axel von (1915). The Berlin Court Under William II. London: Cassell and Company, Ltd. ISBN 1-112-10547-6.
- "The Royal Family". Whitaker's peerage, baronetage, knightage, and companionage. London: J. Whitaker and Sons. 1923. pp. 92–102 – via Internet Archive.
