= Bernard Wilfred Budd =

British politician

- Born: 18 December 1912
- Died: 5 August 2003 (aged 90)
- Education: Cardiff High School; West Leeds High School; Pembroke College Cambridge
- Movement: Liberal
- Spouse: Margaret Alison Burgin MBE
- Relatives: Rt Hon. Edward Leslie Burgin father-in-law, Colin Budd son

Bernard Wilfred Budd QC (18 December 1912 – 5 August 2003), was a British barrister and Liberal Party politician.

== Background ==
Budd was the son of the Reverend W.R.A. Budd. He was educated at Cardiff High School, West Leeds High School and Pembroke College, Cambridge, where he was a scholar in natural sciences receiving a BA in 1934 and an MA in 1944. In 1944 he married Margaret Alison Burgin MBE. She was a daughter of Rt Hon. Edward Leslie Burgin a Liberal MP who held office in the National Government of the 1930s. They had two sons, one of which was Sir Colin Richard Budd who became Ambassador to the Netherlands.

== Professional career ==
Budd Served in the Indian Civil Service from 1935 to 1951. He was Called to Bar by Gray's Inn in 1952. In 1969 he was appointed a QC.

== Political career ==
Budd was Liberal candidate for the Dover division in Kent at the 1964 and 1966 general elections, both times placing third. He became a member of the Liberal party law reform panel. He was Liberal candidate for Folkestone and Hythe, also in Kent, at the February and October 1974 general elections, both times placing second. In 1978, he became Chairman of the Association of Liberal Lawyers. He stood as Liberal candidate for Folkestone and Hythe for the final time in his life in the 1979 general election, wherein again he achieved a second-place finish.

=== Electoral performance ===
General Election 1964: Dover
Party	Candidate	Votes	%	±%
Labour	David Ennals	24,115	44.94	
Conservative	John Arbuthnot	23,697	44.17	
Liberal	Bernard Budd	5,843	10.89	
Majority		418	0.78	
Turnout			82.70	
Labour gain from Conservative		Swing		

General Election 1966: Dover
Party	Candidate	Votes	%	±%
Labour	David Ennals	27,256	49.31	
Conservative	TCG Stacey	24,040	43.49	
Liberal	Bernard Budd	3,981	7.20	
Majority		3,216	5.82	
Turnout			84.18	
Labour hold		Swing		

General Election February 1974: Folkestone and Hythe
Party	Candidate	Votes	%	±%
Conservative	Albert Costain	23,400	47.08	
Liberal	Bernard Budd	14,890	29.96	
Labour	MJS Butler	11,412	22.96	
Majority		8,510	17.12	
Turnout			77.31	
Conservative hold		Swing		

General Election October 1974: Folkestone and Hythe
Party	Candidate	Votes	%	±%
Conservative	Albert Costain	20,930	46.18	
Liberal	Bernard Budd	12,488	27.55	
Labour	MJS Butler	11,639	25.68	
Independent	H Button	265	0.58	
Majority		8,442	18.63	
Turnout			70.03	
Conservative hold		Swing		

General Election 1979: Folkestone and Hythe
Party	Candidate	Votes	%	±%
Conservative	Albert Costain	26,837	55.74	
Liberal	Bernard Budd	10,817	22.47	
Labour	GJ Priestman	10,015	20.80	
National Front	M Lavine	478	0.99	
Majority		16,020	33.27	
Turnout			72.62	
Conservative hold		Swing		
