= Tony Vaughan =

Tony Vaughan may refer to:

- Tony Vaughan (footballer) (born 1975), English footballer
- Tony Vaughan (politician) (born 1982), British politician
