= Rosemary Spencer =

Dame Rosemary Jane Spencer, DCMG (born 1 April 1941) is a retired British civil servant and diplomat. From 1996 to 2001, she served as the United Kingdom's Ambassador to the Netherlands.

Diplomatic posts
Preceded by Sir David Miers	British Ambassadors to the Netherlands; 1996 to 2001	Succeeded by Sir Colin Budd
