= Colin Budd =

British civil servant and diplomat

Sir Colin Richard Budd, KCMG (born 31 August 1945) is a British civil servant and diplomat. The son of the barrister Bernard Budd, he was educated at Kingswood School, Bath, and Pembroke College, Cambridge (his father's alma mater). He served as Chef de Cabinet to the Vice President of the European Commission from 1993 to 1996; as Deputy Secretary of the Cabinet Office, Head of the Overseas and Defence Secretariat, and Chair of the Joint Intelligence Committee from 1996 to 1997; and as the United Kingdom's Ambassador to the Netherlands from 2001 to 2005.

Diplomatic posts
Preceded by Dame Rosemary Spencer	British Ambassadors to the Netherlands; 2001–2005	Succeeded by Lyn Parker
