= Mackensen =

Mackensen may refer to:

- Mackensen (Dassel), a village in Dassel, Lower Saxony, Germany
- August von Mackensen (1849-1945), German World War I field marshal
- Two of his sons:
  - Eberhard von Mackensen (1889-1969), German World War II general
  - Hans Georg von Mackensen (1883-1947), German diplomat
- Fritz Mackensen (1866-1953), German painter
- Isabel Mackensen-Geis (born 1986), German politician
- Mackensen-class battlecruiser, German World War I class of ships
  - SMS Mackensen, the lead ship of the Mackensen class of battlecruisers
