= Jaimie Fuller =

Australian businessman

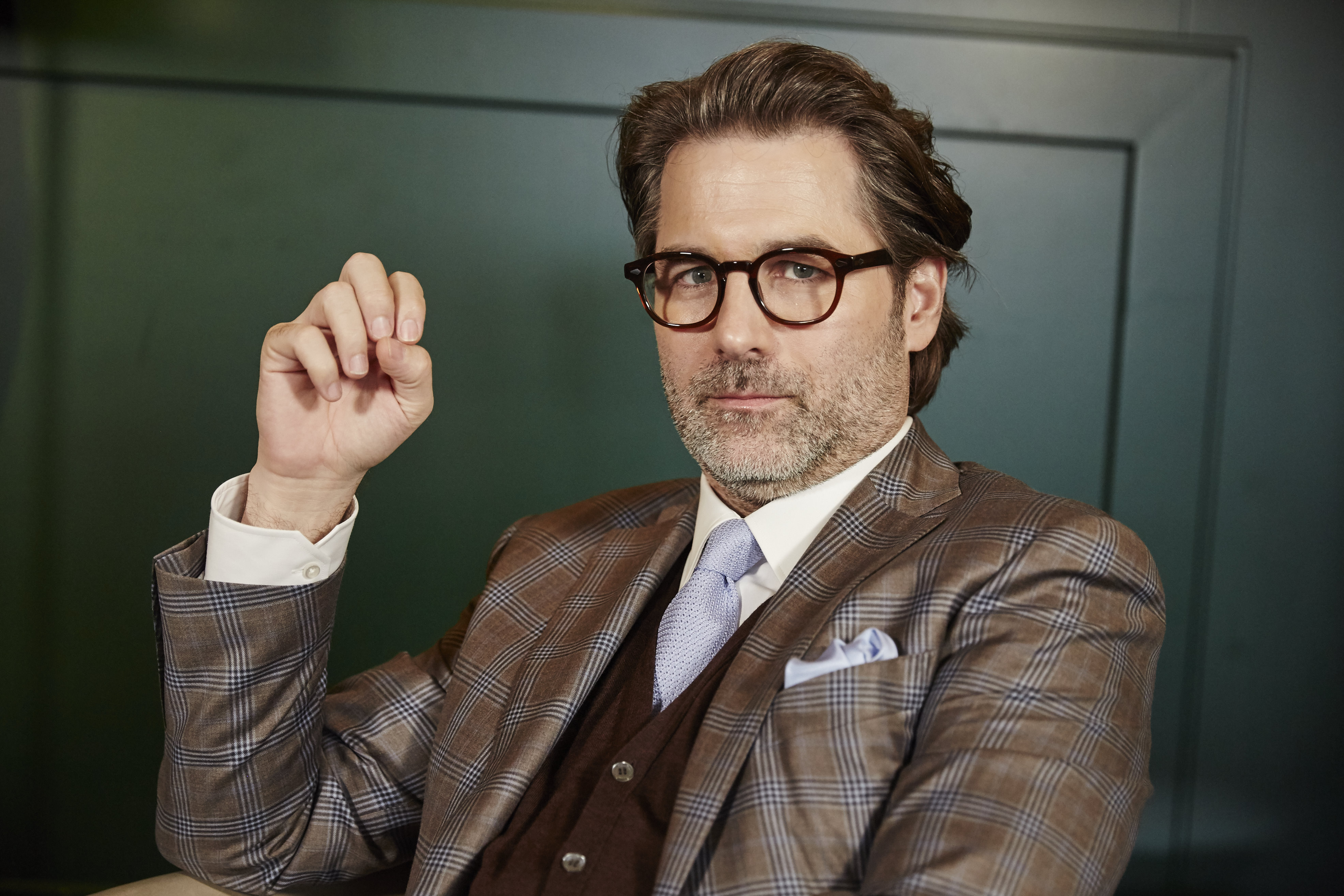
- Occupations: Businessman and sports activist

Jaimie Fuller is an Australian businessman and sports activist. He is the former Executive Chairman of sports compression wear company, Skins, headquartered in Zug, Switzerland.

In 2012, Fuller founded the international pressure group, Change Cycling Now (CCN) along with others including cyclist Greg LeMond, sports scientist, Dr Michael Ashenden and journalists Paul Kimmage and David Walsh. The move was inspired by the growing international criticism of the Union Cycliste Internationale (UCI) and its handling of cycling's doping issues including the Lance Armstrong scandal.

In 2013, Fuller established the anti-doping campaign, #ChooseTheRightTrack as a result of discussions with former Olympic 100-metre champion Ben Johnson about workable options to eradicate doping in sport.

Together with British MP, Damian Collins, and Australian FIFA whistleblower, Bonita Mersiades, Fuller co-founded the campaign group #NewFIFANow by calling out and eradicating the serial allegations of corruption dogging the sport in December 2014, almost six months prior to the May 2015 FIFA arrests.

This led to Fuller pronouncing SKINS the first "official non-sponsor" of FIFA and the creation of the Hypocrisy World Cup campaign in May 2015 fronted by investigative journalist, Andrew Jennings, again prior to the FIFA arrests.

Fuller has also led campaigns for world rugby to give more resources to poorer rugby nations, particularly the Pacific Islands, as well as a Change Cricket campaign for redistribution of resources from richer cricketing nations to poorer ones.

Fuller also supports LGBTI issues, through SKINS. In 2016, SKINS developed a #RainbowLaces campaign for Australian sport to raise awareness about homophobia in sport with Pride in Diversity. This was repeated in 2017.

Fuller is a regular commentator on sport in society and cause-related marketing. Fuller also presented at the 2016 Cannes Lions International Festival of Creativity.
