= Bonita Mersiades =

Australian corporate affairs practitioner, sports administrator and writer

- Occupations: Corporate affairs practitioner, sports administrator, writer
- Years active: 1990s–present
- Employer: Football Federation Australia
- Known for: FIFA whistleblowing, football governance reform
- Notable work: Whatever It Takes: The Inside Story of the FIFA Way

Bonita Mersiades is an Australian corporate affairs practitioner, sports administrator and writer. Between 2007 and 2010, Mersiades was Head of Corporate and Public Affairs with the Football Federation Australia and was also a member of the Senior Management Team for the Australian 2018 and 2022 FIFA World Cup bid.

== Football administration and FIFA reform ==
In the late 1990s, Mersiades was team manager for the Australian national football team. In 2001, Mersiades was part of a delegation that lobbied Frank Lowy to return to football administration.

In 2007, Mersiades was appointed Head of Corporate and Public Affairs with the Football Federation Australia. She left on 24 January 2010.

She is a FIFA whistleblower and has written and spoken extensively on the need for reform of the world governing body of football, FIFA. In November 2014, she was identified as a whistleblower in the summary report of the Garcia Report. She was one of the featured people in the 2016 documentary film Dirty Games by Benjamin Best.

Mersiades became co-founder of an advocacy group campaigning for independent reform of FIFA, #NewFIFANow along with British MP, Damian Collins, and Australian-Swiss businessman, Jaimie Fuller. #NewFIFANow held their first forum at the European Parliament in Brussels in January 2015, in where Mersiades spoke along with Harold Mayne-Nicholls and Lord David Triesman.

In 2020, former politician Robert Cavallucci was hired on nearly double the pay of the last chief executive of Football Queensland at almost A$320,000 a year. The CEO was recruited via a two-month consultancy that earned the president of the board Ben Richardson $44,000. Mersiades is being sued by Football Queensland (FQ) chairman Ben Richardson and its CEO, Robert Cavallucci, for a total of $800,000 over an article she published in January this year on her website Football Today.

== Corporate affairs ==
In the early 2000s, Mersiades worked with the government company National Food Industry Strategy. Mersiades later worked as National Public Affairs Manager for the Australian Red Cross Blood Service. She previously worked in the senior executive service with the federal public sector in Canberra and Brisbane.

== Writing ==
Mersiades in 1998 ghost-wrote a biography of Australian footballer Frank Farina. In 2004, Mersiades edited an anthology of stories by women in the food industry. Mersiades was a contributor to football fansite ozfootball.net. and has written for Sports Business Insider, The Guardian, World Football Insider and others. She is publisher of an Australian curated football news site.

In 2018, Mersiades published a book titled "Whatever It Takes: The Inside Story of the FIFA Way", an investigative piece detailing the bidding process into the awarding of the 2018 and 2022 FIFA World Cups to Russia and Qatar respectively, and what ultimately led to Australia's failed World Cup bid.
