= Damian Collins =

British politician (born 1974)

Damian Collins OBE
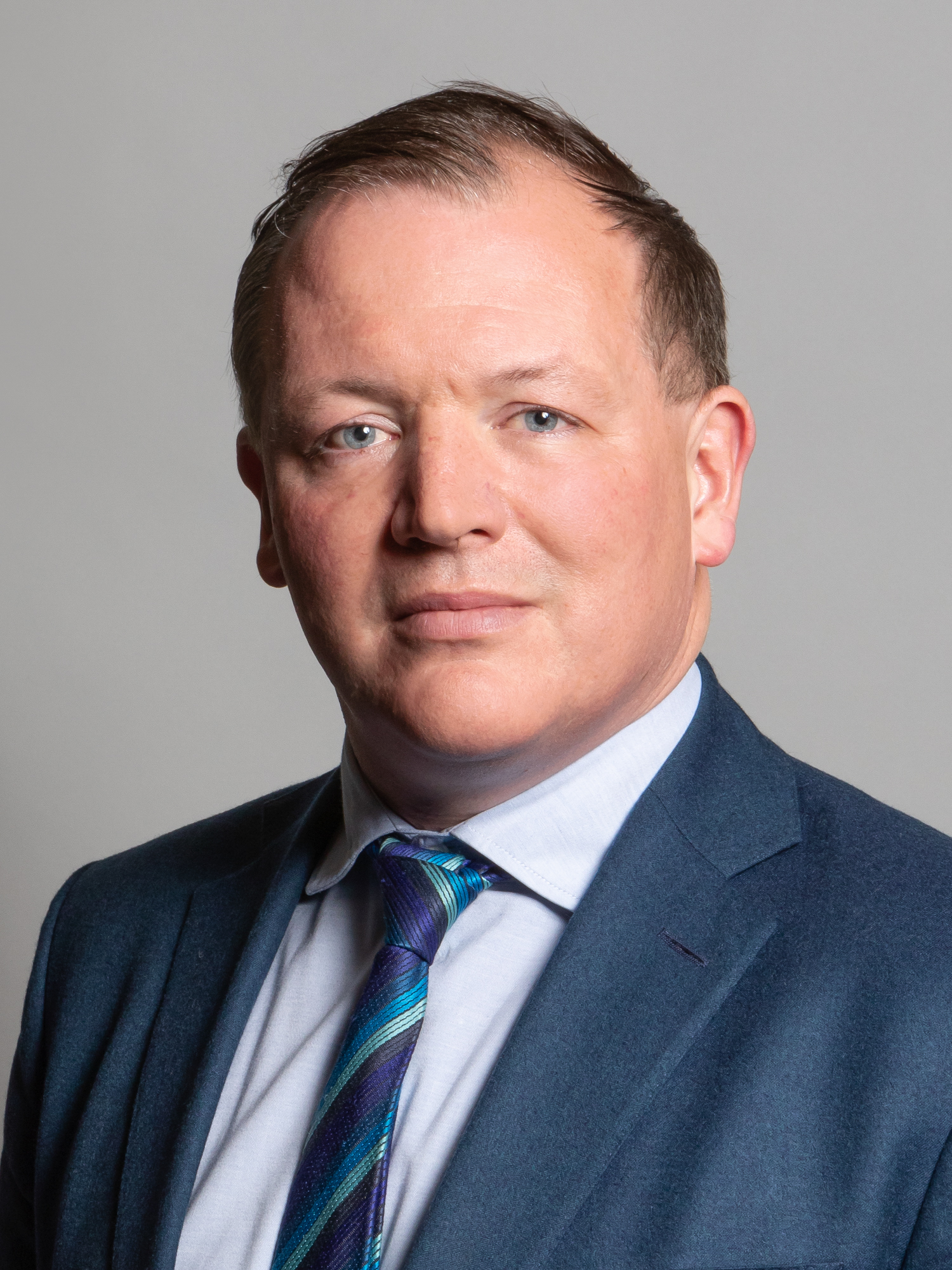
- Official portrait, 2020

Parliamentary Under-Secretary of State for Tech and the Digital Economy
- In office 8 July 2022 – 27 October 2022
- Prime Minister: Boris Johnson; Liz Truss
- Preceded by: Chris Philp
- Succeeded by: Paul Scully

Chair of the Digital, Culture, Media and Sport Committee
- In office 19 October 2016 – 6 December 2019
- Preceded by: Jesse Norman
- Succeeded by: Julian Knight

Member of Parliament for Folkestone and Hythe
- In office 6 May 2010 – 30 May 2024
- Preceded by: Michael Howard
- Succeeded by: Tony Vaughan

Personal details
- Born: Damian Noel Thomas Collins; 4 February 1974 (age 52) Northampton, Northamptonshire, England
- Party: Conservative
- Spouse: Sarah Richardson
- Children: 2
- Education: St Benet's Hall, Oxford
- Website: damiancollins.com

Damian Noel Thomas Collins (born 4 February 1974) is a British politician who served as a junior Minister for Tech and the Digital Economy in the Department for Digital, Culture, Media and Sport between July and October 2022. A member of the Conservative Party, he was the Member of Parliament (MP) for Folkestone and Hythe from 2010 to 2024.

From 2016 to 2019, Collins was chair of the House of Commons Digital, Culture, Media and Sport Select Committee. In 2021, Collins chaired the UK Parliament Joint Committee on the Draft Online Safety Bill.

== Early life and education ==
Damian Collins was born on 4 February 1974 in Northampton. He was educated at St Mary's Roman Catholic High School, a state voluntary aided comprehensive school in Hereford, followed by Belmont Abbey School, a former boarding independent school in Hereford, where he studied for his A Levels. He then studied Modern History at St Benet's Hall at the University of Oxford, graduating in 1996.

During his time as a student, Collins was captain of the St Benet's Hall team on two episodes of University Challenge in October 1994 and January 1995, during Jeremy Paxman’s first series of the show. In 1995 Collins was President of the Oxford University Conservative Association.

== Political career ==
After graduating from Oxford, Collins joined the Conservative Research Department (CRD) in 1996. In 1999, Collins left Conservative Central Office to join the M&C Saatchi advertising agency and in 2008, Collins joined Lexington Communications as Senior Counsel.

From 2003 to 2004 Collins was the Political Officer of the Bow Group think tank, and contributed to its 2006 publication Conservative Revival: Blueprint for a Better Britain (Politico's Publishing, 2006).

At the 2005 general election, Collins stood as the Conservative candidate in Northampton North, coming second with 30.8% of the vote behind the incumbent Labour MP Sally Keeble.

In May 2006, Collins was included on the "A-list" of Conservative parliamentary candidates, created following the election of David Cameron as Leader of the Conservative Party.

On 13 July 2006, Collins was selected as the prospective parliamentary candidate for Folkestone and Hythe. Cameron's predecessor as Conservative leader, Michael Howard, had served as the constituency's MP since 1983; earlier in 2006 he had announced that he would not seek re-election at the forthcoming general election.

== Parliamentary career ==
At the 2010 general election, Collins was elected to Parliament as MP for Folkestone and Hythe with 49.4% of the vote and a majority of 10,122.

Collins made his maiden speech in the House of Commons on 27 May 2010 in the Queen's Speech debate. He spoke about the new Conservative–Liberal Coalition Government’s energy and environmental policy, and his support for a new nuclear power station at Dungeness in his constituency.

On 12 July 2010, Collins became a member of the House of Commons Culture, Media and Sport Select Committee.

On 10 September 2012, Collins was made parliamentary private secretary to the Secretary of State for Northern Ireland, Theresa Villiers.

At the 2015 general election, Collins was re-elected as MP for Folkestone and Hythe with a decreased vote share of 47.9% and an increased majority of 13,797.

In the 2016 Brexit referendum, Collins campaigned for the UK to remain in the European Union. He subsequently supported delivering the result of the referendum, for the UK to leave the EU, describing himself in July 2019 as "someone who voted Remain, but has always upheld the pledge I made at the last general election: to honour the result of the referendum."

In 2016 Collins was elected as chair of the Culture, Media and Sport select committee and was re-elected unopposed following the 2017 general election of the newly renamed Digital, Culture, Media and Sport Select Committee. He remained chair until the dissolution of Parliament on 6 November 2019.

At the snap 2017 general election, Collins was again re-elected, with an increased vote share of 54.7% and an increased majority of 15,411. He was again re-elected at the 2019 general election with an increased vote share of 60.1% and an increased majority of 21,337.

On 27 July 2021, Collins was elected Chair of the UK Parliament Joint Committee on the Draft Online Safety Bill, responsible for pre-legislative scrutiny of the Bill.

In July 2022, Collins was made parliamentary under-secretary of state at the Department for Digital, Culture, Media and Sport (Minister for Tech and the Digital Economy) as part of the caretaker administration of outgoing Prime Minister Boris Johnson. This included responsibility for making the Online Safety Bill law.

He supported Liz Truss in the July–September 2022 Conservative Party leadership election. He was reappointed to his ministerial office following her victory in the contest.

Collins was appointed Officer of the Order of the British Empire (OBE) in the 2023 Birthday Honours for political and public service.

In 2024, Damian Collins lost his seat to Labour challenger Tony Vaughan. Folkestone & Hythe had elected only Conservative MPs since it was first contested in 1950.

== Select Committee inquiries ==
=== Disinformation and fake news ===
Collins launched a high-profile inquiry into disinformation and fake news in the wake of allegations of Russian interference in the 2016 US elections, which also investigated the Facebook–Cambridge Analytica data scandal, concluding that "legal liabilities should be established for tech companies to act against harmful or illegal content on their sites." This led to the UK Government publishing the Online Harms White Paper. The Select Committee's inquiry featured in the 2019 Netflix documentary film The Great Hack.

=== Immersive and addictive technologies ===
The committee's subsequent report on immersive and addictive technologies recommended a review of the Gambling Act 2005 in parliament to define loot boxes as a game of chance, and that "the malicious creation and distribution of deepfake videos should be regarded as harmful content" under the new Online Harms regime.

=== Sport ===
An inquiry into homophobia in sport concluded that "despite the significant change in society's attitudes to homosexuality in the last 30 years, there is little reflection of this progress being seen in football", recommending that "Football clubs should take a tougher approach to incidents of homophobic abuse, issuing immediate bans" and "It should be made clear that match officials should have a duty to report and document any kind of abuse at all levels."

An inquiry into doping in sport was launched following journalistic investigations from The Sunday Times and on ARD about the prevalence of doping in sport and the responsiveness of the World Anti-Doping Agency, UK Anti-Doping, and the International Association of Athletics Federation (IAAF).

=== BBC ===
The committee's inquiry into equal pay at the BBC revealed evidence of pay discrimination at the BBC, and its report on TV licences for the over-75s criticised the BBC's decision to no longer fund all of these. The report held responsible both the BBC and the Government for opaque BBC Charter renewal negotiations in 2015, having led to the BBC becoming responsible for "administering the welfare benefits that should rightly only ever be implemented by the Government" which the BBC then found it could no longer fully fund due to the "disturbing picture of the BBC’s overall finances."

=== Reality TV ===
Following the death of a guest following filming for The Jeremy Kyle Show and the deaths of two former contestants in the dating show Love Island, Collins launched a parliamentary inquiry into reality television. Jeremy Kyle refused to appear in front of the committee. Following Collins' recommendations, broadcasting regulator Ofcom proposed new rules "to require broadcasters to ensure they take ‘due care’ of people participating in television and radio programmes."

=== Sports governance ===
In January 2015, following a panel at the European Parliament hosted by MEPs Ivo Belet, Marc Tarabella and Emma McClarkin, Collins launched campaign group New FIFA Now with former Football Federation Australia Head of Corporate and Public Affairs Bonita Mersiades and businessman Jaimie Fuller, calling for an independent, non-governmental reform committee to address allegations of corruption and promote financial transparency at FIFA.

In May 2020, Collins warned that the COVID-19 pandemic had "badly exposed the weak financial position of clubs in the English Football League (EFL), many of whom were already on the edge of bankruptcy", calling along with the Football Supporters’ Association for a new Football Finance Authority.

=== Digital regulation ===
In November 2018, for the first time since 1933, when the Joint Committee on Indian Constitutional Reform included parliamentarians from India, Collins invited parliamentarians from around the world to the House of Commons in London to form an ‘International Grand Committee’ to discuss disinformation and data privacy.

The International Grand Committee reconvened in Ottawa in May 2019, under the chairmanship of Bob Zimmer, Chair of the House of Commons of Canada Standing Committee on Access to Information, Privacy and Ethics; in Dublin in November 2019, under the chairmanship of Hildegarde Naughton TD, Chair of the Dáil Éireann Joint Committee on Communications, Climate Action and Environment; and virtually in December 2020, under the chairmanship of Congressman David Cicilline, Chair of the US House of Representatives Judiciary Subcommittee on Antitrust, Commercial and Administrative Law.

Collins called for anti-vaccine conspiracy theories to be defined as a category of harmful content in the UK Online Safety Bill, that social media platforms would have a responsibility to protect their users from viewing and sharing. In March 2020 Collins co-founded a fact-checking service called Infotagion to counter COVID-related disinformation, and in September 2020 joined the Real Facebook Oversight Board.

Collins supports reforms to UK electoral law to ensure that analogue campaign transparency laws apply online; that online political donations are transparent and traceable; and that deepfake films released maliciously during election campaigns should be classified as harmful content that social media platforms are required to remove and prevent further distribution. Collins has said that he believes social media platforms facilitated the storming of Capitol Hill on 6 January 2021.

Collins was critical of Facebook's decision to withdraw news services in February 2021 following a dispute with the Australian Government. Collins supports competition regulation to curb social media's market power.

=== World War One remembrance ===
Collins chaired charity Step Short, which was set up to renovate the Road of Remembrance in Folkestone, through which millions of men marched to boats taking them across the Channel to fight in France and Belgium during the First World War. To mark its centenary, the charity raised funds for a new memorial arch. The Step Short Memorial Arch was unveiled by Prince Harry in 2014. Ownership of the Arch has since passed to Folkestone and Hythe District Council.

== Post-political career ==
In late 2024, Collins became a non-executive director of the London-based private intelligence firm Orbis Business Intelligence co-founded by Christopher Steele. Collins is also the Festival Director for business improvement district Fleet Street Quarter and a Senior Fellow at McGill University.

== Personal life ==
Collins's paternal grandfather, Noel Collins, was Irish, being from Donnybrook in Dublin. Collins's father was also born in Dublin. Noel Collins later emigrated, in the mid-1950s, with his wife and children to Great Britain, where the family settled in Northampton. Collins's father was aged six when the family moved to Britain. Damian Collins was born in Northampton.

Collins is married to Sarah Richardson, who served as Lord Mayor of Westminster from 2013 to 2014. Collins and Richardson have two children. Collins is a Roman Catholic.

Collins is the biographer of Sir Philip Sassoon in Charmed Life: The Phenomenal World of Philip Sassoon (William Collins, 2016) and wrote the chapters on David Lloyd George and Theodore Roosevelt for Iain Dale’s The Prime Ministers and The Presidents.

Parliament of the United Kingdom
Preceded by Michael Howard	Member of Parliament for Folkestone and Hythe; 2010–2024	Succeeded by Tony Vaughan
