= Prince August Wilhelm of Prussia =

German prince and Nazi officer (1887–1949)

Prince August Wilhelm
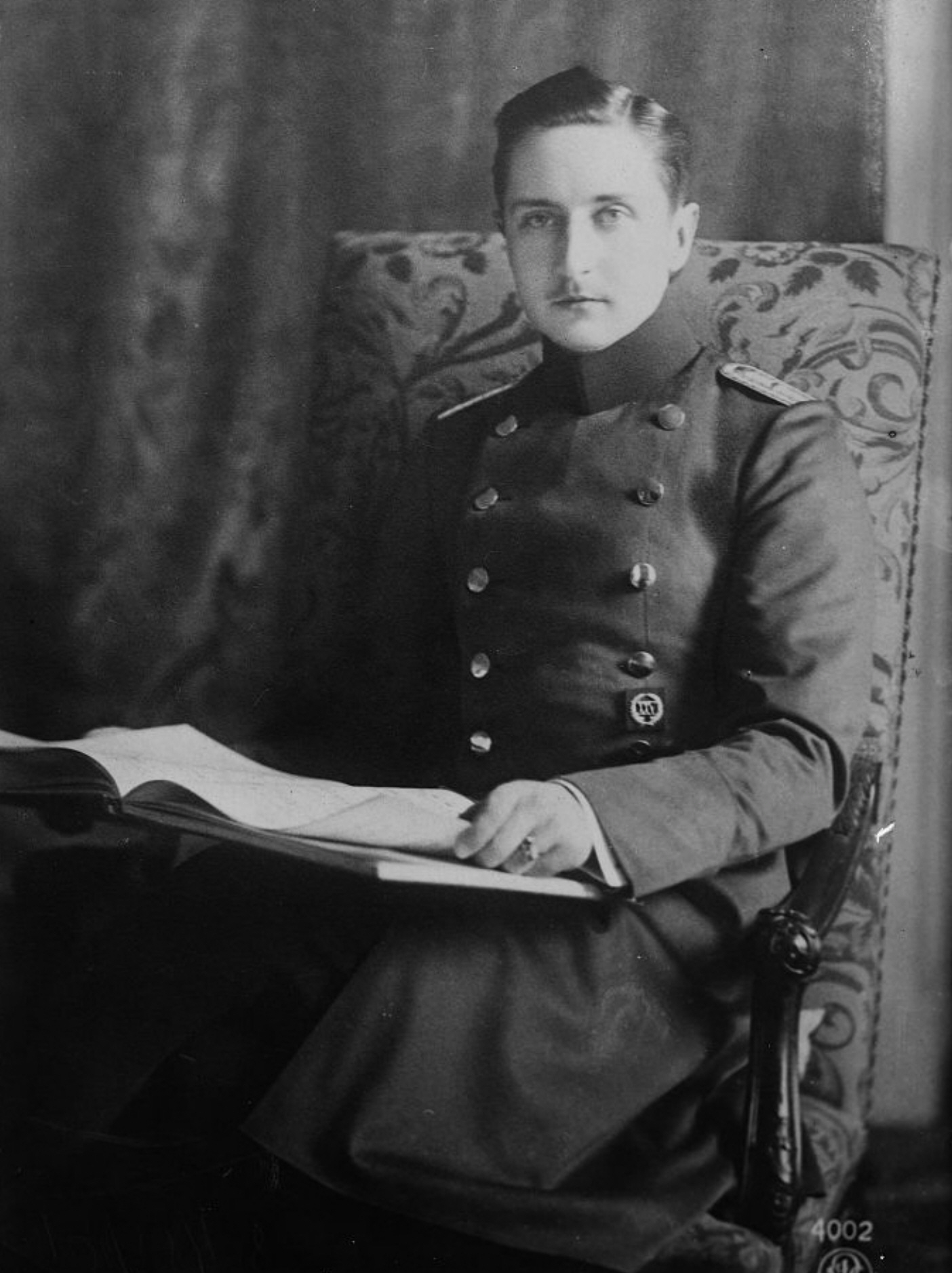
- August Wilhelm in 1905
- Born: 29 January 1887; Potsdam, Prussia, German Empire
- Died: 25 March 1949 (aged 62); Stuttgart, Württemberg-Baden, Allied-occupied Germany
- Burial: Famillienfriedhof, Langenburg, Baden-Württemberg, Germany
- Spouse: Princess Alexandra Victoria of Schleswig-Holstein-Sonderburg-Glücksburg (m. 1908; div. 1920)
- Issue: Prince Alexander Ferdinand
Names
- August Wilhelm Heinrich Günther Viktor
- House: Hohenzollern
- Father: Wilhelm II, German Emperor
- Mother: Augusta Victoria of Schleswig-Holstein

Prince August Wilhelm Heinrich Günther Viktor of Prussia (29 January 1887 – 25 March 1949), nicknamed "Auwi", was the fourth son of German Emperor Wilhelm II by his first wife, Augusta Victoria of Schleswig-Holstein. A vocal supporter of Nazism and of Adolf Hitler, he joined the Nazi party in 1930 and rose to the rank of SA-Obergruppenführer.

== Early life ==
He was born in the Potsdamer Stadtschloss when his grandfather was still the Crown Prince of Prussia. He spent his youth with his siblings at the New Palace, also in Potsdam, and his school days with his brothers at the Prinzenhaus in Plön in his mother's ancestral Schleswig-Holstein. Later, he studied at the universities of Bonn, Berlin and Strasbourg. He received his doctorate in political science in 1907.

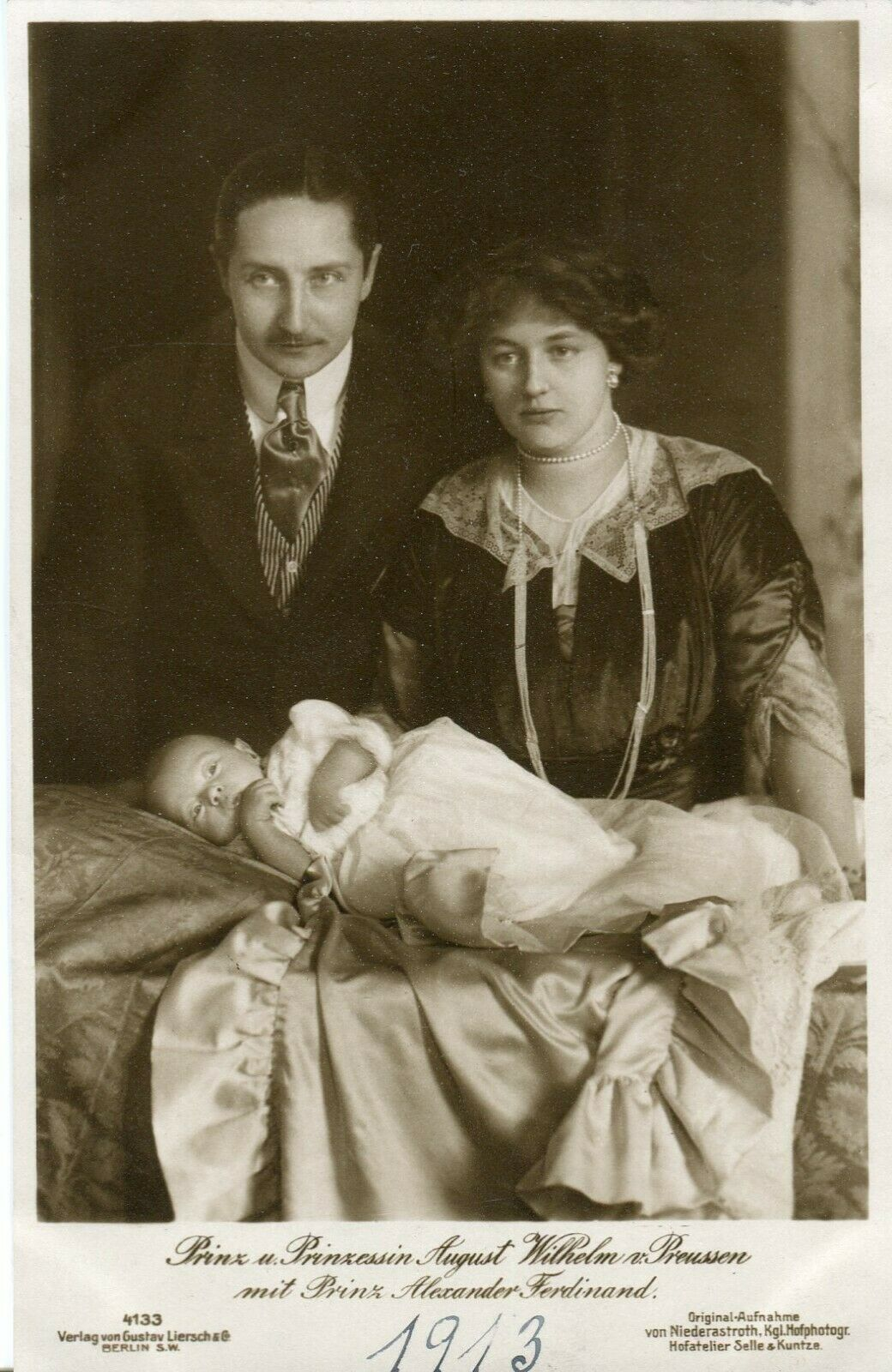
August Wilhelm with his wife and newborn son, 1913.

Prince August Wilhelm married his cousin Princess Alexandra Victoria of Schleswig-Holstein-Sonderburg-Glücksburg on 22 October 1908 at the Berliner Stadtschloss. The couple had planned to take up residence in Schönhausen Palace in Berlin, but changed their mind when his father, Kaiser Wilhelm, decided to leave his son the Villa Liegnitz in the Sanssouci Park. In 1912 their only child, Prince Alexander Ferdinand of Prussia, was born. Their Potsdam residence developed into a meeting place for artists and scholars.

In the First World War, August Wilhelm was made district administrator (Landrat) of the district of Ruppin; his office and residence was now Schloss Rheinsberg. His personal adjutant Hans Georg von Mackensen played an important role in his life; the two had been close friends since August Wilhelm's youth. These "pronounced homophilic tendencies" contributed to the failure of his marriage to Princess Alexandra Victoria. The couple did not divorce while August Wilhelm's father, Kaiser Wilhelm II, was Emperor, owing to his opposition to the idea.

== Weimar Republic ==
Initially, many Allied and German leaders favored transitioning Germany to a constitutional monarchy with August Wilhelm as either Emperor or regent for one of Crown Prince Wilhelm's children, although this possibility was quickly precluded when Philipp Scheidemann was forced by the pressures of the German Revolution to declare a republic. Winston Churchill, who at the time served as Secretary of State for War in the Lloyd George War Cabinet, blamed the failure to retain the monarchy for the political instability that plagued the Weimar Republic.

After the end of the war, the couple separated and formally divorced in March 1920. August Wilhelm was awarded custody of their son. After his divorce and the marriage of his friend von Mackensen to Winifred von Neurath, the daughter of Konstantin von Neurath, August Wilhelm lived a reclusive life in his villa in Potsdam. He took drawing lessons with Arthur Kampf, and the sale of his pictures secured him an additional source of income.

== Involvement with Nazism ==
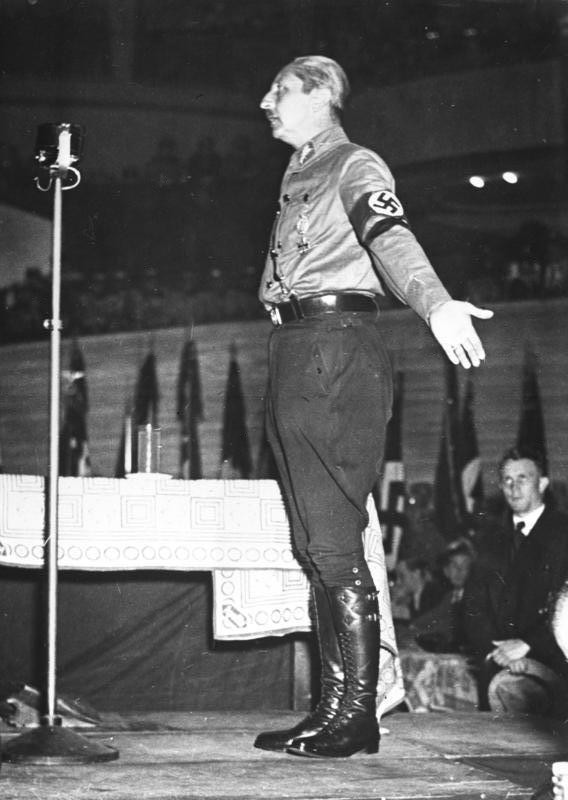
August Wilhelm at an NSDAP rally in the Berlin Sportpalast, 1932.

August Wilhelm joined the conservative nationalist veterans group Der Stahlhelm (English: "The Steel helmet"). In the following years he had increasing contact with the NSDAP. He joined the Nazi Party on 1 April 1930, whereupon he received the low membership number 24, for symbolic reasons. In November 1931, he was accepted into the paramilitary Sturmabteilung (SA) with the rank of Standartenführer. His involvement with the NSDAP and his adoration of Adolf Hitler made August Wilhelm often the subject of mockery by the left-wing press (who gave him the nickname Braunhemdchen Auwi, or "Auwi the Little Brown Shirt"), politicians (French Ambassador André François-Poncet called him Hanswurst "Hans the Brown Sausage") and from the National Socialists themselves (Joseph Goebbels referred to him as a "good-natured but slightly gormless boy").

As a representative of the erstwhile Hohenzollern dynasty, August Wilhelm was deliberately used by the party to gain votes in elections: he was elected as its lead candidate for the Landtag of Prussia in April 1932, and retained his seat until the Landtag's dissolution in October 1933. At the same time, he was appointed an election speaker alongside Hitler, whom he accompanied on flights across Germany. Through his appearances at the party's mass rallies, he addressed himself to sections of the population that were lukewarm towards National Socialism and convinced them "that Hitler was not a threat, but a benefactor of the German people and the German Empire".

At the 5 March 1933 election, August Wilhelm was elected as a Nazi deputy to the German Reichstag from electoral constituency 4, Potsdam I, and he would retain this seat until the fall of the Nazi regime. On 23 July 1933, Prussian Minister President Hermann Göring also appointed him to the recently reconstituted Prussian State Council. August Wilhelm held these positions until the fall of the Nazi regime. However, after the passing of the Enabling Act of 1933 and the establishment of the dictatorship of the Third Reich, the party no longer needed the former prince, who had secretly hoped "that Hitler would one day hoist him or his son Alexander up to the vacant throne of the Kaiser". Thus, in spring 1934 he was denied direct access to Hitler and by the summer after the Night of the Long Knives found himself in the wilderness politically, but that did not reduce his adoration of Hitler.

One visit took August Wilhelm to the Passau Hall of the Nibelungs (Nibelungenhalle).

On 30 June 1939 he was made an SA-Obergruppenführer, the second-highest rank in the SA, but he made derogatory remarks about Joseph Goebbels in private, and so was denounced in 1942. From then on, he was completely sidelined and was banned from making public speeches.

In early February 1945, in the company of the former Crown Princess Cecilie, August Wilhelm fled the approaching Red Army by going from Potsdam to Kronberg to take refuge with his aunt Princess Margaret of Prussia, a sister of his father.

== Post-war life ==
At the end of the Second World War, on 8 May 1945, August Wilhelm was arrested by the U.S. Army and imprisoned in Ludwigsburg. A young German Jewish refugee started his interrogation as an American soldier. At his denazification trial (Spruchkammerverfahren) in 1948, he was asked if he had since repudiated National Socialism, and replied: "I beg your pardon?" He was thus categorized as "incriminated" by the denazification process and sentenced to two-and-a-half years' hard labour. However, as he had been confined in the Ludwigsburg internment camp since 1945, he was considered to have served his sentence.

Immediately after his release, new proceedings were instituted against August Wilhelm. A court in Potsdam, in the Soviet occupation zone, issued an arrest warrant against him, but soon after that he became seriously ill and died at a hospital in Stuttgart at the age of 62 from lung cancer. He was buried in Langenburg in the cemetery of the princes of Hohenlohe-Langenburg. He was identified (in an investigation in the 1960s) as one of those who pulled the trigger in the execution of Albrecht Höhler in 1933.

With his wife, Princess Alexandra of Schleswig-Holstein-Sonderburg-Glücksburg, Prince August Wilhelm had one son:

- Prince Alexander Ferdinand Albrecht Achilles Wilhelm Joseph Viktor Carl Feodor of Prussia (26 December 1912 – 12 June 1985), who married Armgard Weygand on 19 December 1938. They had one son, Prince Stephan Alexander Dieter Friedrich of Prussia (1939–1993); he had one daughter, Princess Stephanie Victoria-Louise of Prussia (born 1966).

== Regimental commissions until First World War ==
- 1. Garderegiment zu Fuß (1st Regiment of Foot Guards), Potsdam: Leutnant à la suite, from January 29, 1897; Oberleutnant, before 1908.
- à la suite, Grenadierregiment Konig Friedrich Wilhelm I. (2. Ostpreussisches) Nr. 3
- à la suite, 2. Gardegrenadierlandwehrregiment (2nd Reserve Regiment of Grenadier Guards)

== Chivalric orders ==
- Kingdom of Prussia:
  - Knight of the Black Eagle, 27 January 1897; with Collar, 1904
  - Knight of the Royal Crown Order, 1st Class, 27 January 1897
  - Grand Commander's Cross of the Royal House Order of Hohenzollern, 27 January 1897
  - Grand Cross of the Red Eagle, with Crown, 29 January 1897
- Denmark: Knight of the Elephant, 15 June 1912
- Grand Duchy of Hesse: Grand Cross of the Ludwig Order, 27 January 1909
- Hohenzollern: Cross of Honour of the Princely House Order of Hohenzollern, 1st Class
- Mecklenburg: Grand Cross of the Wendish Crown
- Netherlands: Grand Cross of the Netherlands Lion
- Ottoman Empire: Order of Osmanieh, 1st Class with Star in Diamonds

== Ancestry ==
Ancestors of Prince August Wilhelm of Prussia

8. William I, German Emperor
4. Frederick III, German Emperor
9. Princess Augusta of Saxe-Weimar-Eisenach
2. Wilhelm II, German Emperor
10. Prince Albert of Saxe-Coburg and Gotha
5. Victoria, Princess Royal
11. Victoria, Queen of the United Kingdom
1. Prince August Wilhelm of Prussia
12. Christian August II, Duke of Schleswig-Holstein-Sonderburg-Augustenburg
6. Frederick VIII, Duke of Schleswig-Holstein
13. Countess Louise Sophie af Danneskiold-Samsøe
3. Princess Augusta Victoria of Schleswig-Holstein-Sonderburg-Augustenburg
14. Ernst I, Prince of Hohenlohe-Langenburg
7. Princess Adelheid of Hohenlohe-Langenburg
15. Princess Feodora of Leiningen
