= Folkestone and Hythe (constituency) =

Parliamentary constituency in the United Kingdom, 1950 onwards

Coordinates: 51.06°N 1.03°E

- County constituency for the House of Commons
- Interactive map of boundaries from 2024
- Boundary of Folkestone and Hythe in South East England
- County: Kent
- Electorate: 70,023 (2023)
- Major settlements: Folkestone, Hythe, Lydd, New Romney

Current constituency
- Created: 1950
- Member of Parliament: Tony Vaughan (Labour)
- Seats: One
- Created from: Ashford; Canterbury; Hythe

Folkestone and Hythe (/ˈfoʊkstən ... ˈhaɪð/) is a constituency (Note: A county constituency (for the purposes of election expenses and type of returning officer)) in Kent represented in the House of Commons of the UK Parliament since 2024 by Tony Vaughan, a Labour MP. (Note: As with all constituencies, the constituency elects one Member of Parliament (MP) by the first past the post system of election at least every five years.)

== Constituency profile ==
The Folkestone and Hythe constituency is located in Kent on the south coast of England and covers most of the local government district of the same name. Its largest settlement is the town of Folkestone, which has a population of around 54,000 and is connected to the smaller town of Hythe. Folkestone was developed during the Victorian era as a popular seaside resort town but has experienced an economic decline similar to other coastal towns in recent decades. The town now has high levels of deprivation with the town centre falling within the 10% most-deprived areas in England, whilst Hythe is comparatively wealthier. On the edge of Folkestone is the Eurotunnel Folkestone Terminal which forms one end of the Channel Tunnel and connects it to High Speed 1.

To the west of Folkestone are the sparsely-populated areas of Romney Marsh and Dungeness, which contain the small towns of New Romney and Lydd and the coastal village of Dymchurch. Dungeness is a large shingle beach and is the site of two decommissioned nuclear power stations. Dungeness is sometimes described as "Britain's only desert", although the Met Office has refuted this. It is an important ecological site and contains a third of Great Britain's plant species. Like Folkestone, these rural areas also experience high levels of deprivation. Across the whole constituency, house prices are marginally lower than the national average.

In general, residents of the constituency are older and have low levels of education. Rates of household income and professional employment are lower than national averages and considerably lower than the rest of South East England. White people made up 92% of the population at the 2021 census. At the local district council, Folkestone is mostly represented by Labour Party councillors, whilst Hythe elected Greens and the rural west elected Conservatives. At the county council, which held elections more recently, most of the constituency is represented by Reform UK except Hythe, which elected Liberal Democrats. Voters in the constituency strongly supported leaving the European Union in the 2016 referendum; an estimated 63% voted in favour of Brexit compared to 52% nationwide.

== History ==
Until 2024, Folkestone and Hythe had elected a Conservative MP at every general election since its creation 1950, as had the earlier Hythe constituency since the late 19th century; it was therefore regarded as a Conservative safe seat. However, in 2024 it was won for the first time by the Labour Party.

From 1983 to 2010 it was held by Michael Howard. He held several cabinet posts, including Home Secretary from 1993 to 1997. In Opposition, he was Leader of the Conservative Party from 2003 to 2005.

== Boundaries ==
Map of boundaries 2010–2024

1950–1983: The Boroughs of Folkestone, Hythe, Lydd, and New Romney, and the Rural Districts of Elham and Romney Marsh.

1983–2010: The District of Shepway.

2010–2024: The District of Shepway (renamed Folkestone and Hythe in 2018), and the Borough of Ashford ward of Saxon Shore.

2024–present: The District of Folkestone and Hythe wards of Broadmead, Cheriton, East Folkestone, Folkestone Central, Folkestone Harbour, Hythe, Hythe Rural, New Romney, Romney Marsh, Sandgate & West Folkestone, and Walland & Denge Marsh.

Electorate reduced to bring it within the permitted range by transferring out the North Downs area in the north, along with the parts in the Borough of Ashford, primarily to the reconfigured constituency of Ashford.

== Members of Parliament ==
The current Member of Parliament is Tony Vaughan of the Labour Party who was elected at the 2024 general election. Vaughan's predecessors for the seat were Damian Collins (served 2010–2024) and Michael Howard (served 1983–2010). Howard held a number of political posts during his career in Parliament, most prominently as Home Secretary from 1993 to 1997 and Leader of the Conservative Party from 2003 to 2005.

Election	Member	Party
1950	Harry Mackeson	Conservative
1959	Albert Costain	Conservative
1983	Michael Howard	Conservative
2010	Damian Collins	Conservative
2024	Tony Vaughan	Labour

== Elections ==
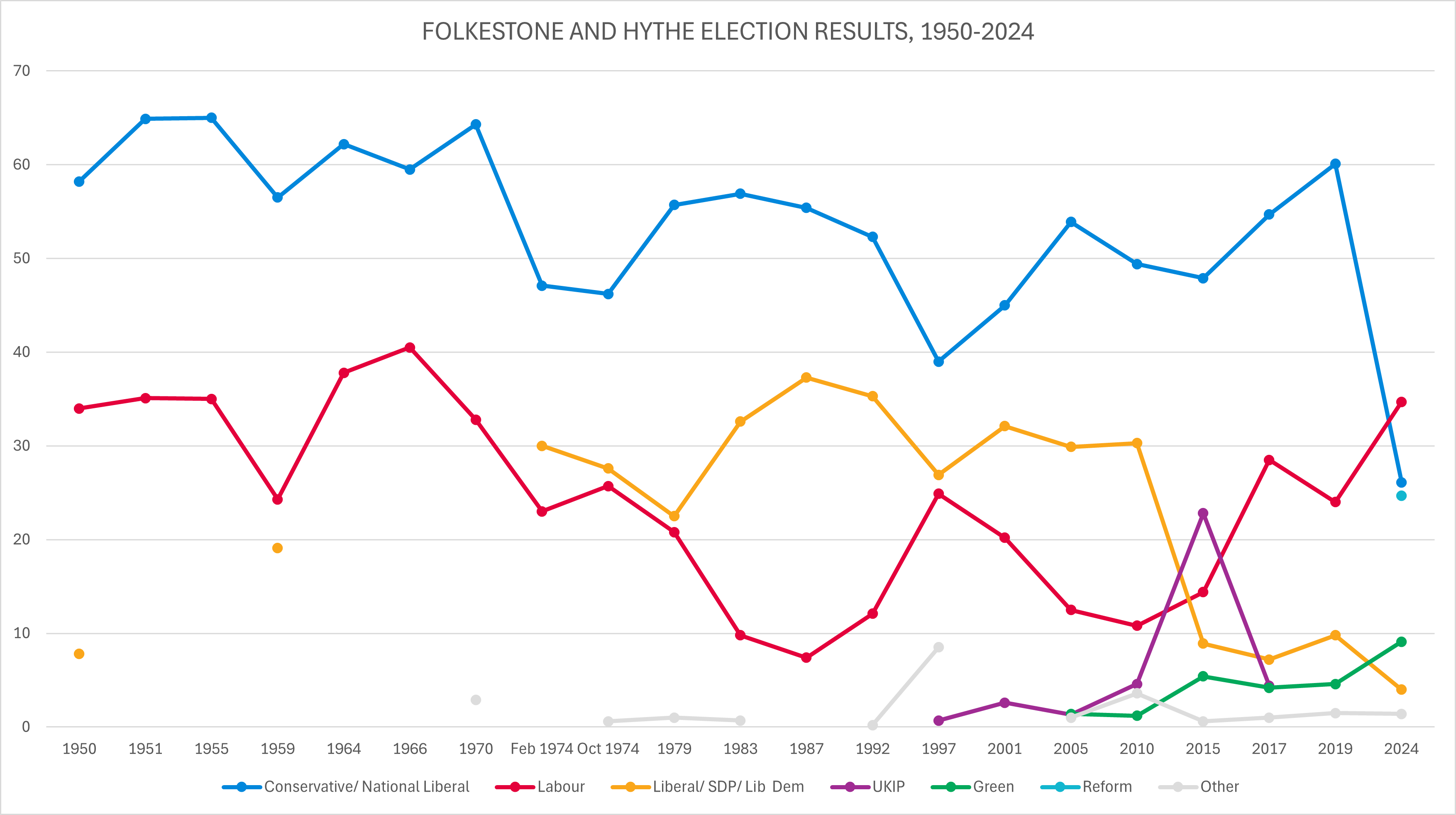
Election results 1950-2024

=== Elections in the 2020s ===
General election 2024: Folkestone and Hythe
Party	Candidate	Votes	%	±%
Labour	Tony Vaughan	15,020	34.7	+7.9
Conservative	Damian Collins	11,291	26.1	−30.2
Reform	William Wright	10,685	24.7	N/A
Green	Marianne Brett	3,954	9.1	+4.2
Liberal Democrats	Larry Ngan	1,736	4.0	−6.0
TUSC	Momtaz Khanom	249	0.6	N/A
Fairer Voting Party	David Allen	240	0.6	N/A
Socialist (GB)	Andy Thomas	71	0.2	+0.1
Majority		3,729	8.6	N/A
Turnout		43,246	61.7	−2.3
Registered electors		70,056		
Labour gain from Conservative		Swing	+19.1	

=== Elections in the 2010s ===
2019 notional result
Party	Vote	%
Conservative	25,227	56.3
Labour	11,988	26.8
Liberal Democrats	4,481	10.0
Green	2,184	4.9
Others	915	2.1
Turnout	44,795	64.0
Electorate	70,023	

General election 2019: Folkestone and Hythe
Party	Candidate	Votes	%	±%
Conservative	Damian Collins	35,483	60.1	+5.4
Labour	Laura Davison	14,146	24.0	−4.5
Liberal Democrats	Simon Bishop	5,755	9.8	+2.6
Green	Georgina Treloar	2,706	4.6	+0.4
Independent	Henry Bolton	576	1.0	N/A
SDP	Colin Menniss	190	0.3	N/A
Young People's	Rohen Kapur	80	0.1	N/A
Socialist (GB)	Andy Thomas	69	0.1	N/A
Majority		21,337	36.1	+9.9
Turnout		59,005	66.8	−1.6
Conservative hold		Swing	+5.0	

General election 2017: Folkestone and Hythe
Party	Candidate	Votes	%	±%
Conservative	Damian Collins	32,197	54.7	+6.8
Labour	Laura Davison	16,786	28.5	+14.1
Liberal Democrats	Lynne Beaumont	4,222	7.2	−1.7
UKIP	Stephen Priestley	2,565	4.4	−18.4
Green	Martin Whybrow	2,498	4.2	−1.2
Independent	David Plumstead	493	0.8	N/A
Independent	Naomi Slade	114	0.2	N/A
Majority		15,411	26.2	+1.1
Turnout		58,875	68.4	+2.6
Conservative hold		Swing	−3.7	

General election 2015: Folkestone and Hythe
Party	Candidate	Votes	%	±%
Conservative	Damian Collins	26,323	47.9	−1.5
UKIP	Harriet Yeo	12,526	22.8	+18.2
Labour	Claire Jeffrey	7,939	14.4	+3.6
Liberal Democrats	Lynne Beaumont	4,882	8.9	−21.4
Green	Martin Whybrow	2,956	5.4	+4.2
TUSC	Seth Cruse	244	0.4	N/A
Young People's	Rohen Kapur	72	0.1	N/A
Socialist (GB)	Andy Thomas	68	0.1	N/A
Majority		13,797	25.1	+6.0
Turnout		55,010	65.8	−1.9
Conservative hold		Swing	−9.9	

General election 2010: Folkestone and Hythe
Party	Candidate	Votes	%	±%
Conservative	Damian Collins	26,109	49.4	−4.5
Liberal Democrats	Lynne Beaumont	15,987	30.3	+0.7
Labour	Donald Worsley	5,719	10.8	−1.8
UKIP	Frank McKenna	2,439	4.6	+3.3
BNP	Harry Williams	1,662	3.1	N/A
Green	Penny Kemp	637	1.2	−0.3
Independent	David Plumstead	247	0.5	+0.5
Majority		10,122	19.1	−4.9
Turnout		52,800	67.7	−1.0
Conservative hold		Swing	−2.6	

=== Elections in the 2000s ===
General election 2005: Folkestone and Hythe
Party	Candidate	Votes	%	±%
Conservative	Michael Howard	26,161	53.9	+8.9
Liberal Democrats	Peter Carroll	14,481	29.9	−2.2
Labour	Maureen Tomison	6,053	12.5	−7.7
Green	Hazel Dawe	688	1.4	N/A
UKIP	Petrina Holdsworth	619	1.3	−1.3
Monster Raving Loony	Lord Toby Jug	175	0.4	N/A
Get Britain Back	Rodney Hylton-Potts	153	0.3	N/A
Senior Citizens	Grahame Leon-Smith	151	0.3	N/A
Peace and Progress	Sylvia Dunn	22	0.0	N/A
Majority		11,680	24.0	+11.1
Turnout		48,503	68.4	+4.3
Conservative hold		Swing	+5.6	

General election 2001: Folkestone and Hythe
Party	Candidate	Votes	%	±%
Conservative	Michael Howard	20,645	45.0	+6.0
Liberal Democrats	Peter Carroll	14,738	32.1	+5.2
Labour	Albert Catterall	9,260	20.2	−4.7
UKIP	John Baker	1,212	2.6	+1.9
Majority		5,907	12.9	+0.8
Turnout		45,855	64.1	−8.6
Conservative hold		Swing	−0.4	

=== Elections in the 1990s ===
General election 1997: Folkestone and Hythe
Party	Candidate	Votes	%	±%
Conservative	Michael Howard	20,313	39.0	−13.3
Liberal Democrats	David Laws	13,981	26.9	−8.4
Labour	Peter Doherty	12,939	24.9	+12.8
Referendum	John Aspinall	4,188	8.0	N/A
UKIP	John Baker	378	0.7	N/A
Socialist	Eric Segal	182	0.4	N/A
Country Field and Shooting Sports	Raymond Saint	69	0.1	N/A
Majority		6,332	12.1	−4.9
Turnout		52,050	72.7	−6.9
Conservative hold		Swing	−2.5	

General election 1992: Folkestone and Hythe
Party	Candidate	Votes	%	±%
Conservative	Michael Howard	27,437	52.3	−3.1
Liberal Democrats	Linda W. Cufley	18,527	35.3	−2.0
Labour	Peter Doherty	6,347	12.1	+4.7
Natural Law	Anthony Hobbs	123	0.2	N/A
Majority		8,910	17.0	−1.1
Turnout		52,434	79.6	+1.3
Conservative hold		Swing	−0.6	

=== Elections in the 1980s ===
General election 1987: Folkestone and Hythe
Party	Candidate	Votes	%	±%
Conservative	Michael Howard	27,915	55.4	−1.5
Liberal	John MacDonald	18,789	37.3	+4.7
Labour	Vidya Anand	3,720	7.4	−2.4
Majority		9,126	18.1	−6.2
Turnout		50,424	78.3	+8.7
Conservative hold		Swing		

General election 1983: Folkestone and Hythe
Party	Candidate	Votes	%	±%
Conservative	Michael Howard	27,261	56.9	+1.2
Liberal	John MacDonald	15,591	32.6	+10.1
Labour	Leslie Lawrie	4,700	9.8	−11.0
Independent	Philip Todd	318	0.7	N/A
Majority		11,670	24.3	−8.9
Turnout		47,870	69.6	−3.0
Conservative hold		Swing		

=== Elections in the 1970s ===
General election 1979: Folkestone and Hythe
Party	Candidate	Votes	%	±%
Conservative	Albert Costain	26,837	55.74	+9.66
Liberal	Bernard Budd	10,817	22.47	−5.08
Labour	GJ Priestman	10,015	20.8	−4.88
National Front	M Lavine	478	0.99	N/A
Majority		16,020	33.2	+14.6
Turnout		48,147	72.6	+2.6
Conservative hold		Swing	+7.3	

General election October 1974: Folkestone and Hythe
Party	Candidate	Votes	%	±%
Conservative	Albert Costain	20,930	46.18	−0.90
Liberal	Bernard Budd	12,488	27.55	−2.41
Labour	MJS Butler	11,639	25.68	+2.72
Independent	Harold W. Button	265	0.58	N/A
Majority		8,442	18.63	+1.51
Turnout		45,322	70.03	−7.28
Conservative hold		Swing	+0.75	

General election February 1974: Folkestone and Hythe
Party	Candidate	Votes	%	±%
Conservative	Albert Costain	23,400	47.08	−17.25
Liberal	Bernard Budd	14,890	29.96	N/A
Labour	MJS Butler	11,412	22.96	−9.81
Majority		8,510	17.12	−14.44
Turnout		49,702	77.31	+8.50
Conservative hold		Swing	−23.10	

General election 1970: Folkestone and Hythe
Party	Candidate	Votes	%	±%
Conservative	Albert Costain	27,031	64.33	+3.82
Labour	Nicholas A Hyman	13,772	32.77	−7.62
Independent	Harold W Button	1,219	2.90	N/A
Majority		13,259	31.56	+11.35
Turnout		42,022	68.81	−1.79
Conservative hold		Swing	+5.22	

=== Elections in the 1960s ===
General election 1966: Folkestone and Hythe
Party	Candidate	Votes	%	±%
Conservative	Albert Costain	22,964	59.51	−2.72
Labour	John Horam	15,562	40.39	+2.72
Majority		7,402	19.22	−5.24
Turnout		38,526	70.60	−0.39
Conservative hold		Swing	−2.72	

General election 1964: Folkestone and Hythe
Party	Candidate	Votes	%	±%
Conservative	Albert Costain	23,587	62.23	+5.79
Labour	Michael J. Stewart	14,314	37.77	+14.45
Majority		9,273	24.46	−7.76
Turnout		37,901	70.99	−5.42
Conservative hold		Swing	−4.33	

=== Elections in the 1950s ===
General election 1959: Folkestone and Hythe
Party	Candidate	Votes	%	±%
Conservative	Albert Costain	21,726	56.54	−8.45
Labour	W Edgar Simpkins	9,346	24.32	−10.69
Liberal	Robert D Emerson	7,351	19.13	N/A
Majority		12,380	32.22	+2.24
Turnout		38,423	76.41	+3.38
Conservative hold		Swing	+1.12	

General election 1955: Folkestone and Hythe
Party	Candidate	Votes	%	±%
Conservative	Harry Mackeson	23,851	64.99	+0.12
Labour	Leslie Leonard Reeves	12,849	35.01	−0.12
Majority		11,002	29.98	+0.24
Turnout		36,700	72.83	−6.12
Conservative hold		Swing	+0.12	

General election 1951: Folkestone and Hythe
Party	Candidate	Votes	%	±%
Conservative	Harry Mackeson	25,792	64.87	+6.65
Labour	I Rhys Jones	13,968	35.13	+1.11
Majority		11,824	29.74	+5.54
Turnout		39,760	78.95	−4.29
Conservative hold		Swing	+2.77	

General election 1950: Folkestone and Hythe
Party	Candidate	Votes	%	±%
Conservative	Harry Mackeson	23,767	58.22	
Labour	Moss Murray	13,885	34.02	
Liberal	Ray Ward Bateson	3,168	7.76	
Majority		9,882	24.20	
Turnout		40,820	83.24	
Conservative win (new seat)				

== See also ==
- Parliamentary constituencies in Kent
- List of parliamentary constituencies in the South East England (region)

== Sources ==
- Election result, 2005 (BBC)
- Election results 1997–2001 (BBC)
- Election results 1997–2001 (Election Demon)
- Election results 1992–2010 (The Guardian)

Parliament of the United Kingdom
Preceded by Chingford and Woodford Green	Constituency represented by the leader of the opposition 2003–2005	Succeeded by Witney
