= Harry Mackeson =

British soldier and politician

Sir Harry Mackeson 1st Baronet

Secretary for Overseas Trade
- In office 28 May 1952 – 3 September 1953
- Prime Minister: Winston Churchill
- Preceded by: Henry Hopkinson
- Succeeded by: Derick Heathcoat-Amory

Government Deputy Chief Whip in the House of Commons
- In office 26 October 1951 – 28 May 1952 Serving with Herbert Butcher
- Prime Minister: Winston Churchill
- Preceded by: Robert Taylor
- Succeeded by: Edward Heath; Herbert Butcher

Opposition Deputy Chief Whip of the House of Commons
- In office 18 March 1950 – 26 October 1951 Serving with Cedric Drewe
- Leader: Winston Churchill
- Preceded by: Cedric Drewe
- Succeeded by: Robert Taylor

Member of Parliament for Folkestone and Hythe Hythe (1945–1950)
- In office 5 July 1945 – 8 October 1959
- Preceded by: Rupert Brabner
- Succeeded by: Albert Costain

Personal details
- Born: Harry Ripley Mackeson; 25 May 1905
- Died: 25 January 1964 (aged 58)
- Party: Conservative
- Spouse: Alethea Chetwynd-Talbot
- Parent(s): Henry Mackeson & Ella Ripley

Sir Harry Ripley Mackeson, 1st Baronet (25 May 1905 – 25 January 1964) was a British soldier and Conservative politician.

== Early life ==
Mackeson was the son of Henry Mackeson and Ella Cecil Ripley. He served in the Royal Scots Greys regiment of the British Army and achieved the rank of Brigadier.

== Political career ==
In 1945 he was elected to the House of Commons for Hythe, a seat he held until 1950 when the constituency was abolished, and then represented Folkestone and Hythe until 1959.

Mackeson served under Winston Churchill as a Lord of the Treasury from 1951 to 1952 and as Secretary for Overseas Trade from 1952 to 1953. In 1954 he was created a Baronet, of Hythe in the County of Kent.

== Personal life ==
Mackeson married Alethea Cecil Chetwynd-Talbot, daughter of Reginald George Chetwynd-Talbot, in 1940.

He died in January 1964, aged 58, and was succeeded in the baronetcy by his son Rupert.

== Notes ==
Parliament of the United Kingdom
Preceded by Rupert Brabner	Member of Parliament for Hythe; 1945 – 1950	Constituency abolished
New constituency	Member of Parliament for Folkestone & Hythe; 1950 – 1959	Succeeded by Sir Albert Costain
Political offices
Preceded by Robert Taylor	Deputy Chief Whip of the House of Commons; 1951–1952; Served alongside: Herbert Butcher	Succeeded by Martin Redmayne
Preceded by Henry Hopkinson	Secretary for Overseas Trade; 1952–1953	Office abolished
Party political offices
Preceded by Cedric Drewe	Conservative Deputy Chief Whip in the House of Commons; 1950–1952; Served alongside: Cedric Drewe (1950–1951)	Succeeded by Edward Heath
Baronetage of the United Kingdom
New creation	Baronet (of Hythe); 1954–1964	Succeeded by Rupert Mackeson
