= Prince Alexander Ferdinand of Prussia =

Prussian prince (1912–1985)

Prince Alexander Ferdinand
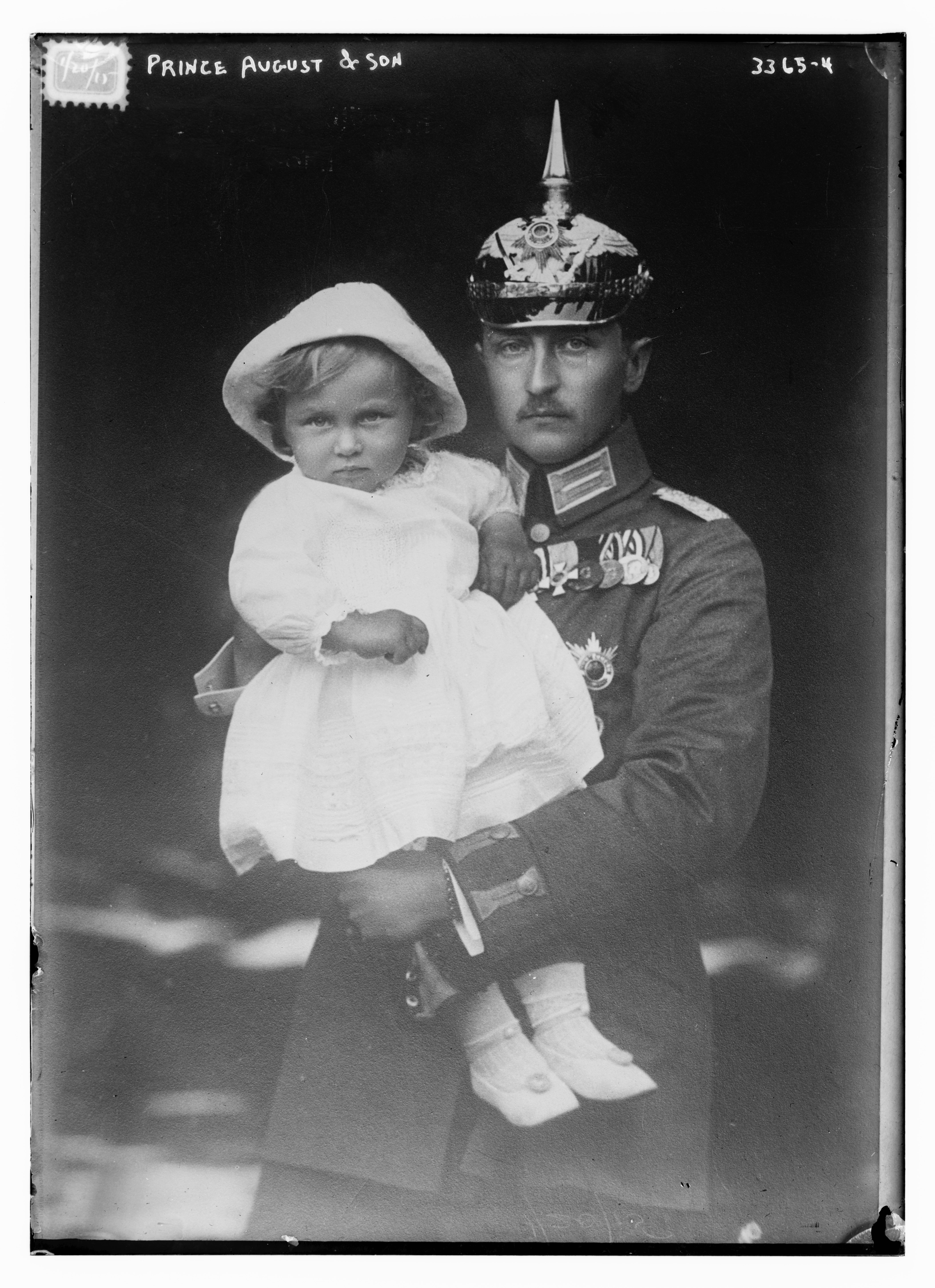
- Alexander (left) with his father (right)
- Born: 26 December 1912
- Died: 12 June 1985 (aged 72); Wiesbaden, West Germany
- Spouse: Armgard Weygand (m. 1938)
- Issue: Prince Stephan Alexander
Names
- Alexander Ferdinand Albrecht Achilles Wilhelm Joseph Viktor Karl Feodor
- House: Hohenzollern
- Father: Prince August Wilhelm of Prussia
- Mother: Princess Alexandra Victoria of Schleswig-Holstein-Sonderburg-Glücksburg

Prince Alexander Ferdinand Albrecht Achilles Wilhelm Joseph Viktor Karl Feodor of Prussia (26 December 1912 – 12 June 1985) was the only son of Prince August Wilhelm of Prussia and Princess Alexandra Victoria of Schleswig-Holstein-Sonderburg-Glücksburg.

== Family and early life ==
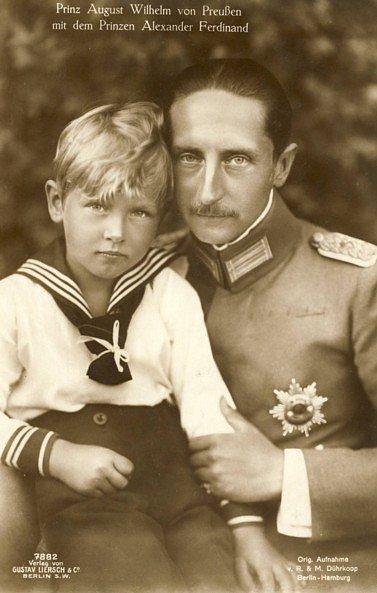
A postcard of Prince Alexander with his father.

Prince Alexander of Prussia was born on 26 December 1912 to Prince August Wilhelm of Prussia and his wife Princess Alexandra Victoria of Schleswig-Holstein-Sonderburg-Glücksburg. August Wilhelm was a younger son of Kaiser Wilhelm II.

His parents divorced in 1920 and his mother remarried less than two years later; custody of the young prince was awarded to Alexander's father.

Alexander attended the 1932 wedding of the Swedish prince Gustaf Adolf, Duke of Västerbotten with Princess Sibylla of Saxe-Coburg-Gotha in the former duchy of Coburg; it was the first time that a member of the German imperial family had entered the duchy since it became a republic, or specifically a part of Bavaria in November 1919 after the ruling duke, Carl Eduard, had ended his reign on 14 November 1918.

== Nazi Party and military career ==
As of November 1939, Prince Alexander was a first lieutenant in the Air Force Signal Corps, stationed in Wiesbaden.

Like his father, who became a prominent supporter of the Nazi Party, Alexander became an early supporter. Prince August had secret hopes that Chancellor Adolf Hitler "would one day hoist him or his son Alexander up to the vacant throne of the Kaiser". The support that father and son gave to the emerging party caused strong disagreements among the Hohenzollerns, with Wilhelm II urging them both to leave the party.

In 1933, Alexander quit the SA and became a private in the German regular army. Unlike many other German princes, who became the targets of Hitler's mistrust and were removed from their commands in the military, Alexander was the only Hohenzollern allowed to remain at his post.

== Marriage ==
On 19 December 1938 in the Dresden garrison church, Alexander non-dynastically married Armgard Weygand (22 August 1912 – 3 December 2001), daughter of Major Friedrich Weygand and Karla Franziska Oheim. She was married from 1928 to 1933 to Werner Rosendorff, airman in the German Air Force, and was originally from Wiesbaden, where Alexander Ferdinand was stationed. As the marriage had not been dynastically approved, none of his relatives attended the ceremony, but fellow officers served as witnesses.

They had one son:

- Prince Stephan Alexander Dieter Friedrich of Prussia (30 September 1939 – 12 February 1993); he married Heide Schmidt (born 6 February 1939) on 28 February 1964 and they were divorced in 1976. They have one daughter. He remarried Hannelore-Maria Kerscher (born 26 October 1952) on 19 June 1981.
  - Princess Stephanie Viktoria-Luise of Prussia (21 September 1966); she married Amadi Mbaraka Bao (born in 1958 in Tanzania) on 19 April 1991. They have two sons and two daughters and were divorced on 20 July 1999.

== Death ==
Prince Alexander Ferdinand died on 12 June 1985 at Wiesbaden.

== Ancestry ==
Ancestors of Prince Alexander Ferdinand of Prussia

8. Frederick III, German Emperor
4. Wilhelm II, German Emperor
9. Victoria, Princess Royal
2. Prince August Wilhelm of Prussia
10. Frederick VIII, Duke of Schleswig-Holstein
5. Princess Augusta Victoria of Schleswig-Holstein-Sonderburg-Augustenburg
11. Princess Adelheid of Hohenlohe-Langenburg
1. Prince Alexander Ferdinand of Prussia
12. Friedrich, Duke of Schleswig-Holstein-Sonderburg-Glücksburg
6. Friedrich Ferdinand, Duke of Schleswig-Holstein
13. Princess Adelheid of Schaumburg-Lippe
3. Princess Alexandra Victoria of Schleswig-Holstein-Sonderburg-Glücksburg
14. Frederick VIII, Duke of Schleswig-Holstein (= 10)
7. Princess Karoline Mathilde of Schleswig-Holstein-Sonderburg-Augustenburg
15. Princess Adelheid of Hohenlohe-Langenburg (= 11)
