= Skins (sportswear) =

Australian sportswear company

SKINS
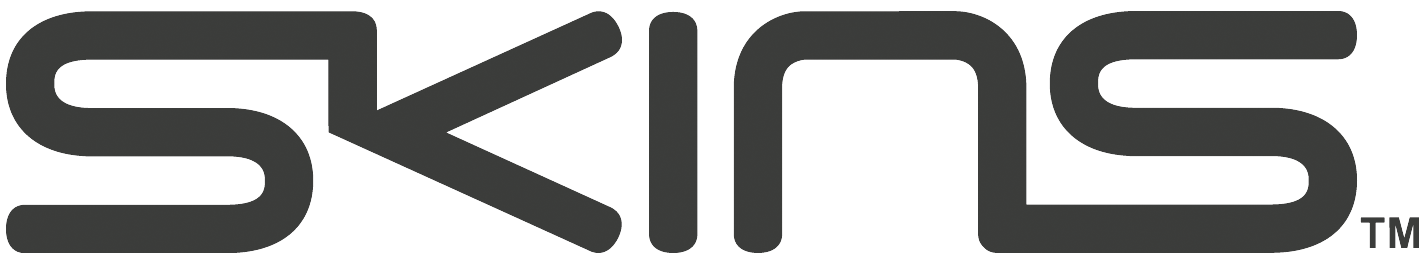
- Industry: Textile
- Founded: 1996
- Founder: Brad Duffy
- Fate: Filed for bankruptcy in 2019, brand and name acquired
- Headquarters: Australia
- Area served: Worldwide
- Key people: Gary Chan (CEO)
- Products: Compression garment
- Owner: Symphony Holdings (2019–)
- Website: skinscompression.com

Skins, stylized SKINS, is an Australian manufacturing company founded in 1996 that designs and produces compression garment for athletes and sports enthusiasts. After filing for bankruptcy in 2019, the company was acquired by Hong Kong–based Symphony Holdings, a holding company that owns the rights to the use of the "SKINS" brand.

== History ==
The company was founded in 1996 by Brad Duffy, an Australian physiologist and ski enthusiast. In 1998, SKINS launched their first three product ranges: 'JetSkins' for travel, 'SportsSkins' for multi sports and 'SnowSkins' for Alpine pursuits. Australian cricket captain Steve Waugh was chosen as the public face of the new products.

Initially, the range was limited to long tights only and was sold exclusively online and through telesales. By 2002, the product was still being manufactured in Sydney but was being sold through around 20 retail outlets in Australia. In the same year, Australian entrepreneur Jaimie Fuller was appointed as CEO of SKINS.

In 2008, SKINS sold over 160 different compression products including specific ranges for golf, cycling, triathlon and snow sports. The company had around 80 full-time members of staff and retailed through more than 800 specialty retailers in their home territory of Australia.

After filing for bankruptcy with the Swiss court in January 2019, the SKINS brand and associated intellectual property was acquired by Symphony Holdings, a public company based in Hong Kong, and placed under new management.

== Advertising and controversy ==
SKINS has a history of bold and controversial advertising. A series of adverts that ran in 2005 to 2006 caused the Australian Competition & Consumer Commission (ACCC) to allege that SKINS had engaged in misleading and deceptive conduct. The adverts in question stated that "We don't pay sports stars to wear our product. They pay us". The ACCC contested this claim and produced a list of athletes who were sponsored and paid by SKINS. In 2009 the Federal Court of Australia handed down judgment in favour of the ACCC and SKINS agreed to provide undertakings to the Court, pay costs and publish corrective advertisements. The same court also upheld an accusation of retail price maintenance against SKINS, who induced, by request, a retailer in Adelaide not to lower the retail prices of their products.

SKINS ran an advertising campaign in 2006 which featured the famous "Swoosh" logo of Nike, Inc. placed upside down across the mouths of athletes to form a grimace. Nike demanded SKINS to cease this advertising, which they did. However, the advertising campaign received praise for its creativity from the Advertising Federation of Australia.

== Retail partnerships ==
In 2010, SKINS partnered with Chinese sportswear manufacturer Li-Ning with a range of co-branded products being produced for the Chinese market by the two companies.

In 2012, SKINS has partnered with the Itochu Corporation of Japan to distribute SKINS products in Japan, China, South Korea, Taiwan and Hong Kong.

== Anti-doping campaigns ==
SKINS has been vocal opponents of blood doping in sports and were the first company to be certified by BikePure, an independent, not-for-profit organisation which advocates ethical cycling practices and conducts anti-doping research.

In September 2013, SKINS launched an Anti-Doping initiative called Pure Sport, petitioning for change with the International Olympic Committee and the World Anti-Doping Agency. Former Canadian sprinter Ben Johnson has joined the campaign; Johnson had his gold medal rescinded after the 1988 Summer Olympics after testing positive for the banned substance Stanozolol.

== Other associations ==
The company was involved with the Mars Society Australia in the development of MarsSkin, a prototype spacesuit that was tested in the Flinders Ranges in Australia in August 2004.

Their compression stockings are listed on the Australian Register of Therapeutic Goods as a medical device for reducing oedema.

== See also ==
- List of fitness wear brands
