= Tony Vaughan (politician) =

British MP

Tony Vaughan KC MP
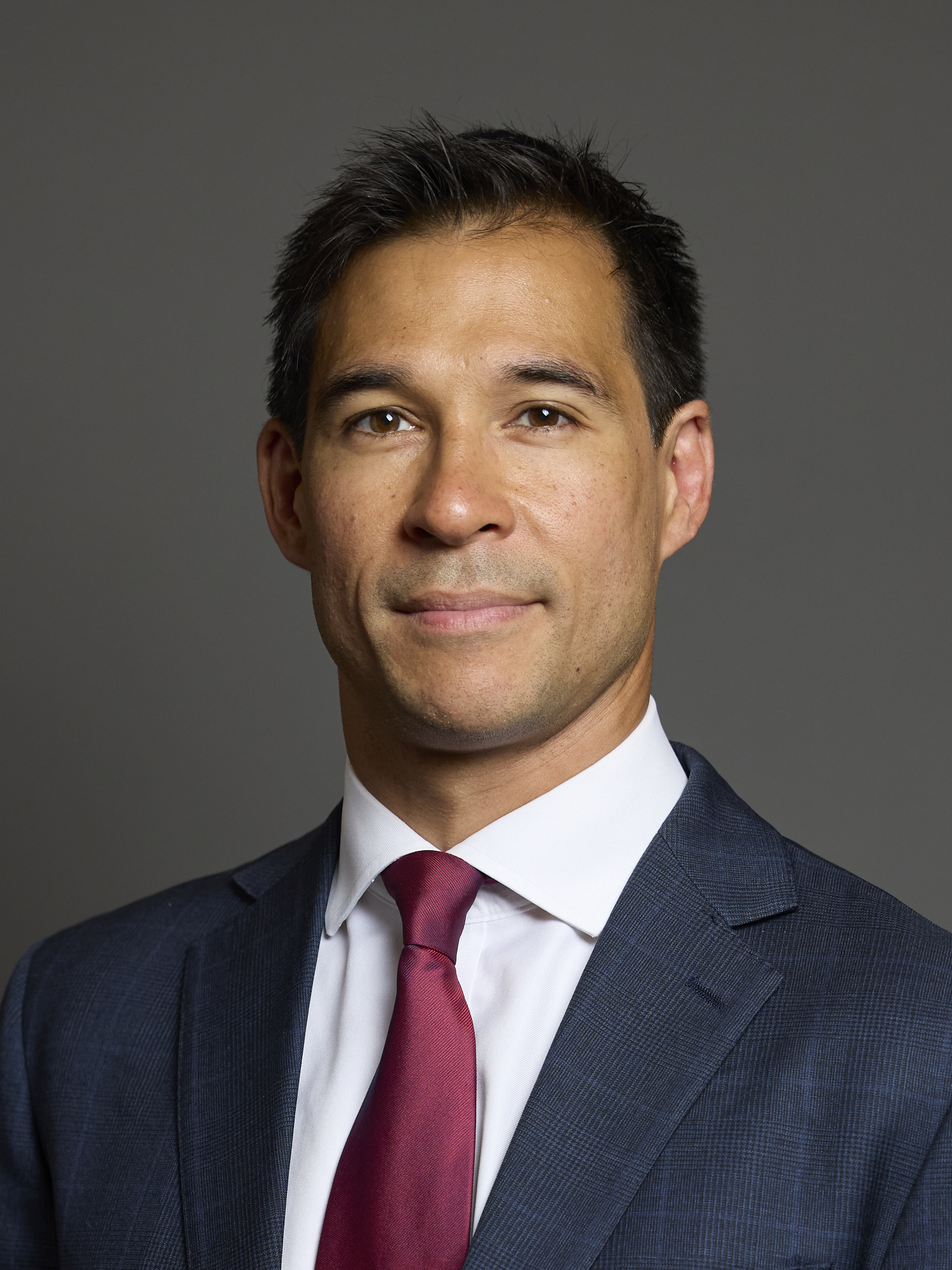
- Official portrait, 2024

Member of Parliament for Folkestone and Hythe
- Incumbent
- Assumed office 4 July 2024
- Preceded by: Damian Collins
- Majority: 3,729 (8.6%)

Personal details
- Born: Anthony Vaughan; March 1982 (age 44)
- Party: Labour
- Education: St Catharine's College, Cambridge; SOAS University of London

Anthony Vaughan KC (born March 1982) is a British politician who has been Member of Parliament (MP) for Folkestone and Hythe since 2024. He is the first Labour politician to represent the constituency since its inception in 1950 and the first MP of Filipino descent.

== Early life ==
Vaughan was born to an English father and a Filipina mother and grew up in Hitchin, Hertfordshire. His mother Aida "Inday" Langrimas arrived in Britain in 1973 from San Roque. Vaughan studied law at St Catharine's College, Cambridge, and was awarded a postgraduate LLM at the School of Oriental and African Studies, University of London (SOAS).

== Legal career ==
In 2006, Vaughan was called to the bar and practises at Doughty Street Chambers in London, with a particular focus on cases involving immigration, deprivation of liberty and human trafficking. In 2025, Vaughan was appointed a King's Counsel (KC).

== Political career ==
Vaughan was first elected to parliament in the 2024 United Kingdom general election. His constituency of Folkestone and Hythe was not a Labour target seat and he had not been expected to win; Folkestone had previously been won by the Conservative Party in every general election since 1885. In November 2025, he criticised the Starmer government's plans for reforming the asylum system.

Following a string of defeats in the 2026 United Kingdom local elections, Vaughan joined a list of Labour MPs in calling for Keir Starmer to resign as Prime Minister.

In October 2026, he apologised in the House of Commons after an Independent Expert Panel found that he had breached Parliament's bullying and harassment policy towards a member of his constituency staff. The inquiry found that Vaughan hugged the staffer without her consent, took her phone from her hands to attend a Zoom call, and unfairly blamed her for mistakes.

Parliament of the United Kingdom
Preceded by Damian Collins	Member of Parliament for Folkestone and Hythe; 2024–present	Incumbent
