= Mackeson baronets =

Baronetcy in the Baronetage of the United Kingdom

- Escutcheon of the Mackeson baronets of Hythe
- Creation date: 1954
- Status: extant
- Motto: Inest sua gratia parvis, Even small things have a charm

The Mackeson Baronetcy, of Hythe in the County of Kent, is a title in the Baronetage of the United Kingdom. It was created on 29 January 1954 for the Conservative politician Harry Mackeson. He served as Secretary for Overseas Trade from 1952 to 1953. As of 2010 the title is held by his son, the second Baronet, who succeeded in 1964. He is an author using the pseudonym Rupert Collens.

== Mackeson baronets, of Hythe (1954) ==
- Sir Harry Ripley Mackeson, 1st Baronet (1905–1964)
- Sir Rupert Henry Mackeson, 2nd Baronet (born 1941). There is no heir to the baronetcy.
