= Albert Costain =

British politician

Sir Albert Costain

Member of Parliament for Folkestone and Hythe
- In office 8 October 1959 – 13 May 1983
- Preceded by: Harry Mackeson
- Succeeded by: Michael Howard

Personal details
- Born: 5 July 1910
- Died: 5 March 1987 (age 76)
- Party: Conservative

Sir Albert Costain (5 July 1910 – 5 March 1987) was a Conservative Party politician in the United Kingdom. He was member of parliament for Folkestone and Hythe from 1959 to 1983, preceding future Conservative leader Michael Howard.

== Early career ==
Costain was educated at King James's School, Knaresborough and the College of Estate Management. He became production director on the formation of Richard Costain Ltd in 1933 and was later chairman of the company. The Sir Albert Costain Memorial Awards are awarded to trainee staff for successful achievement.

== As MP ==
During his parliamentary career he was parliamentary private secretary to the Minister of Public Building and Works from 1962 to 1964, to the Minister of Technology in 1970, to the Chancellor of the Duchy of Lancaster from 1970 to 1972, and to the Secretary of State for the Environment from 1972 to 1974.

Costain was also a member of the Speaker's panel of chairman in the House of Commons. He was knighted in the 1980 Birthday Honours.

Costain stepped down at the 1983 election, and died in 1987.

Parliament of the United Kingdom
Preceded by Harry Mackeson	Member of Parliament for Folkestone and Hythe; 1959–1983	Succeeded by Michael Howard
