= Rupert Mackeson =

British author and former soldier (born 1941)

Sir Rupert Mackeson 2nd Baronet
- Born: 16 November 1941 (age 84)
- Education: Harrow School
- Alma mater: Trinity College, Dublin; Royal Military Academy Sandhurst
- Occupations: Author, banker & soldier
- Father: Sir Harry Mackeson
- Military career
- Allegiance: United Kingdom
- Branch: British Army
- Unit: Royal Horse Guards

Sir Rupert Mackeson, 2nd Baronet (born 16 November 1941) is a British author and former soldier.

== Background and education ==
Mackeson is the son of Sir Harry Mackeson, 1st Baronet, and his wife Alethea Cecil Chetwynd-Talbot. His grandfather Henry Mackeson was the founder of the Mackeson brewery.

He was educated at Harrow School, Trinity College, Dublin and Sandhurst.

== Career ==
After serving four years in the Royal Horse Guards, Mackeson began working in the City of London. When he left the army, Mackeson found employment running a London bank with strong ties to the Mafia, which Mackeson freely admits. "I ran a Mafia controlled financial institution," he declared in The Guardian. Since he "did not want to end up under Blackfriars Bridge," when the "aggravation" of running a "mobbed up" bank became too much for him, Mackeson relocated to Rhodesia (now Zimbabwe), which was then under the control of a white-minority government. There, Mackeson began a career in smuggling. In order to "curry favor with Mrs.Thatcher", the Rhodesian authorities arrested him and imprisoned him in the Khami prison camp. Within a day, Mackeson was removed from the prison for inciting a riot. When the Rhodesian authorities attempted to extradite him to the UK, Mackeson punched his guard in the nose while on board a plane, forcing the plane to land. When he was finally transported back to the UK, the judge presiding over the case ruled that it was an illegal extradition—a kidnapping, in essence—and had him freed.

Since release, Mackeson has become a writer of books about racing, writing under his own name and also as Rupert Collens. Bet Like a Man (2001) is a novel about the cloning of a Derby winner. He also writes for the Racing Post and runs a mobile bookshop and art gallery which operates on British racecourses.

== Books as Rupert Mackeson ==
- Great Racing Gambles and Frauds
- Flat Racing Scams and Scandals (Metro Publishing, 2004) ISBN 978-1-84358-042-3
- Bet Like a Man (Eye Ltd, Bridgnorth, 2001) ISBN 1-903070-13-9

== Books as Rupert Collens ==
- 50 Cheltenham Gold Cups
- Cecil Aldin's Dogs and Hounds
- 25 Legal Luminaries from Vanity Fair
- Snaffles: His Life and Works (with John Welcome)
- Snaffles on Racing and Point to Pointing (with John Welcome)
- Snaffles on Hunting (with John Welcome)

Baronetage of the United Kingdom
Preceded by Harry Mackeson	Baronet (of Hythe); 1964–present	Incumbent
