= Hans Georg von Mackensen =

German politician and diplomat (1883–1947)

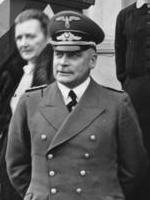
- Mackensen in 1939
- Born: Hans-Georg Viktor von Mackensen; 26 January 1883; Berlin, German Empire
- Died: 28 September 1947 (aged 64); Konstanz, South Baden, Allied-occupied Germany
- Occupations: Adjutant; diplomat; ambassador
- Political party: Nazi Party
- Spouse: Winifred Christine Helene Baroness of Neurath (m. 1926)
- Parents: August von Mackensen; Dorothea von Horn
- Relatives: Eberhard von Mackensen (brother)

Hans Georg von Mackensen (26 January 1883 – 28 September 1947) was a German diplomat who served at different stages as "State Secretary" at the Foreign Ministry, German ambassador in Rome and a SS Group Leader ("Gruppenführer").

== Early life ==
Mackensen came from an established military family. His father, August von Mackensen (1849–1945), was eventually, in 1915, promoted to the rank of Field Marshal: Even after 1918, August von Mackensen would remain an unapologetic high-profile monarchist traditionalist who in 1941, despite his advanced age and the difficulties of travelling in war time, made his way to Doorn (near Utrecht) where, dressed in his full military uniform from the imperial years, he attended the funeral of the former German emperor. Hans Georg von Mackensen's mother, born Dorothea von Horn (1854–1905), also came from a family of minor aristocrats.

His younger brother, Eberhard von Mackensen became an army general. As a child Hans Georg grew up as a companion to Prince August Wilhelm of Prussia, one of the emperor's younger sons. The two men became life-long friends.

== Career ==
In 1902, he entered the army as a trainee officer in the 1st Foot Guards regiment. He continued to serve after completing his training in 1907. However, in 1911 he withdrew from active service, becoming a reserve officer, in order to complete his study of Jurisprudence, after which he entered the Prussian legal service.

=== War years and entry to the diplomatic service ===
During the First World War Mackensen returned to the army, serving between 1914 and 1917 as adjutant to his friend Prince August Wilhelm of Prussia, and ending up with the rank of "Hauptmann" (Captain). After the war ended, he took a job with the Prussian Ministry of Justice, staying until May 1919, when he accepted an invitation to switch to the Foreign Ministry. In 1923 he was posted as a diplomatic envoy ("Gesandtschaftsrat II. Klasse") to the embassy in Rome between 1923 and 1926, which was followed by a posting to Brussels between 1926 and 1931. During his time in Rome, he served under his future father-in-law, Baron Konstantin von Neurath, who served as the German ambassador to Italy between 1921 and 1930.

=== Career progression as a diplomat ===
Close family links on various sides to the aristocratic-military elite from the days of empire continued to help Mackensen's career progression in the diplomatic service of the German Republic. The Auswärtiges Amt was dominated by the aristocracy during the Kaiserreich. Aristocrats made up 1% of the German population, but comprised 69% of all German diplomats during the Imperial era. Despite the November revolution of 1918, the Auswärtiges Amt continued to dominated by an aristocratic network which ensured that noblemen continued to be disproportionately overrepresented in the German diplomatic corps right up to 1945. The orders given in 1919 to stop discriminating against commoners were widely ignored by the Auswärtiges Amt, who continued to favor aristocrats in terms of both recruitment and promotion. Commoners serving in Auswärtiges Amt were always regarded as "outsiders".

Despite his relative inexperience and youth, in 1929 he was given temporary charge over the German diplomatic mission to Tirana, at what was an exceptionally critical time for the developing relationship between Albania's ambitious new king and the rest of Europe. In July 1931, a couple of months after republican government replaced the Spanish monarchy, Mackensen was transferred again, to be appointed "first diplomat councillor" (Botschaftsrat) at the embassy in Madrid.

=== Régime change ===
Following months of political deadlock, everything changed in January 1933 when the Hitler government, spotting a power vacuum, filled it: they lost no time in transforming Germany into a one-party dictatorship. There are no indications that Hans Georg von Mackensen had taken much interest in the party politics of the German Republic up to this point. Nevertheless, in May 1933 he signed up as a member of the National Socialist ("Nazi") Party. In September 1933 his transfer to Budapest was announced, and in December he took up a posting as the new government's "first councillor" (Botschaftsrat) in the Hungarian capital. Ambassador-level diplomatic relations having at this stage not been established with former component states of the Austro-Hungarian empire, that made him Germany's senior "permanent diplomatic representative" in Budapest.

=== State Secretary ===
Four years later Mackensen was recalled to Berlin where, on 16 April 1937, he took over as State Secretary at the Foreign Ministry. The appointment had been announced less than a month earlier, on 24 March 1937. He thereby became the senior non-politician at the Foreign Ministry. It was a position that had been vacant since the death the previous summer of the former incumbent, Bernhard von Bülow, possibly from natural causes. As State Secretary Mackensen's political boss was the German Foreign Minister, Konstantin von Neurath, who also happened to be his father-in-law.

On 8 July 1937, the Second Sino-Japanese war started with the Marco Polo Bridge Incident. The war brought long-standing tensions between Neurath and Joachim von Ribbentrop to a boil. Ribbentrop, besides being the German ambassador in London, also headed the Dienststelle Ribbentrop, a sort of rival foreign office that competed with the Auswärtiges Amt. Neurath and Mackensen favored continuing the policy started under the Weimar republic of supporting the Kuomintang regime via arms sales, a military mission to train the National Revolutionary Army and industrial sales in exchange for China selling Germany certain strategical materials at below market prices. Ribbentrop for reasons that remain unclear had a violent hatred of the Chinese and a corresponding ardent admiration for the Japanese.

Ribbentrop was very close to the Japanese military attaché in Berlin, General Hiroshi Ōshima, and once the Sino-Japanese war started lobbied Adolf Hitler very strongly to withdraw the German military mission from China and end the arms sales to the Chinese. By contrast, both Neurath and Mackensen favored China over Japan, arguing for keeping the military mission in China and for continuing arms sales.

Ribbentrop had initially been rather vague about why he favored Japan over China, giving as his reasons merely that it was better to be with the "strong" (i.e. Japan) rather than the "weak" (i.e. China). However, by 1937, hurt by various social humiliations he suffered as ambassador in London, Ribbentrop had become a raging Anglophobe, which fitted in well with the increasing tendency towards an anti-British foreign policy. Ribbentrop started to play his trump card for a pro-Japanese foreign policy, arguing that China barely had a navy while Japan had the strongest navy in Asia, which led him to the conclusion that Japan was the better ally for the Reich in Asia.

The question of recognizing the Japanese sham state of Manchukuo was a litmus test for whether a state preferred closer relations with China vs. closer relations with Japan. Ribbentrop became increasingly vocal as 1937 went on in demanding that Germany recognise Manchukuo over the opposition of Neurath and Mackensen.

In August 1937 and again in September, the Austrian Foreign Minister Guido Schmidt visited Berlin, where Mackensen bullied him during both visits, demanding that the Austrian government allow the Austrian Nazis a greater role in the political process. Neurath had been in post since 1932, but on 4 February 1938 he was removed from office and replaced at short notice by Joachim von Ribbentrop, reflecting a determination on the part of Adolf Hitler to take a more "personally hands-on" approach to Germany's foreign policy.

On 20 February 1938, Hitler gave a speech before the Reichstag where he announced that Germany had just extended diplomatic recognition to Manchukuo. Despite his earlier opposition to recognizing Manchukuo, Mackensen supported this step, even through he knew that it would ruin Germany's relations with China. In one of his last acts as State Secretary, Mackensen had to accept the note of protest against the recognition of Manchukuo from Cheng Tien-fong, the Chinese ambassador in Berlin. Mackensen treated Cheng with much rudeness during the meeting, saying that China was an insignificant nation, and the Reich did not care about Chinese opinions. Ribbentrop was unwilling to accept the son-in-law of Neurath as State Secretary, and appointed Baron Ernst von Weizsäcker as the new State Secretary.

=== Ambassador in Rome ===
As part of the ensuing reshuffle at the top of the diplomatic service, Hans Georg von Mackensen was appointed Ambassador to Rome in succession to Ulrich von Hassell, who had been recalled at short notice in the aftermath of the so-called Blomberg–Fritsch affair. Neurath believed that he had been fired as foreign minister at least in part because of his disagreements with Ribbentrop over East Asia. Mackensen was also closely associated with the pro-Chinese foreign policy advocated by Neurath, and Ribbentrop saw him as an obstacle to the pro-Japanese foreign policy he wanted to pursue. Macksensen might no longer be State Secretary, but the Rome embassy was, in the context of the diplomatic developments of the time, an exceptionally important posting. There were suggestions within and beyond the diplomatic establishment that his unusually rapid rise through the ranks of the German diplomatic service had been both the result of his inherited family connections and a direct reflection of Mackensen's uncritical and unhesitating execution of every order he received from his superiors, combined with an apparent reluctance to feed any ideas of his own back to Berlin.

Another individual who declined to be dazzled by Mackensen's diplomatic cachet was the French ambassador to Berlin, André François-Poncet: "J’ai visité l’Auswärtiges Amt; j’ai vu le père, et j’ai vu le fils, mais je n’ai pas vu le Saint Esprit". (Note: "I visited the [German] foreign office: I saw the father, and I saw the son, but I did not see the Holy Spirit.") The American historian Gerhard Weinberg wrote that Mackensen was an "unimaginative diplomat" whose rise was due entirely to being an aristocrat with connections to powerful people. Mackensen had excellent relations with the Italian Foreign Minister Count Galeazzo Ciano with whom he was very close; by contrast his relations with Ciano's father-in-law, Benito Mussolini were not as close. The situation with Mackensen in Rome inverted the situation when Hassell was the German ambassador as Hassell had poor relations with Count Ciano and very good relations with Mussolini. Mackensen was a very committed supporter of the Nazi regime, and as ambassador in Rome he worked tirelessly to strengthen the Axis. Mussolini had appointed his son-in-law Ciano Foreign Minister in 1936 in order to overcome the reluctance of the professional diplomats of the Palazzo Chigi towards closer ties with Germany, thus providing a bond with Ciano who was also keen to strengthen the Axis alliance.

In February–March 1938, the Anschluss took place as the Austrian Nazis with strong support from Germany overthrew the Austrian government. As Austria had been in the Italian sphere of influence, Hitler was concerned about the possible rupture with the emerging Axis with Italy. Italy had a powerful navy, which would be useful given the increasing anti-British direction of German foreign policy. As warships took much time to build in contrast to airplanes and tanks, the Kriegsmarine was still in the early stages of its rearmament in the late 1930s, thus requiring Germany to build alliances with nations with strong navies such as Italy and Japan to strengthen Germany's hand against Britain. Mackensen was personally briefed by Hitler before departing for Rome. Upon arriving in Rome, Mackensen was greeted at the train station by Mussolini and Count Ciano. Anxious to make a good impression, Mackensen poured out effusive praise for Fascist Italy to his hosts and promised Mussolini that Germany was willing to make economic concessions in return for Italian acceptance of the Anschluss. Knowing that many within the Italian government were highly concerned about the possibility of an irredentist campaign to claim the German-speaking South Tyrol region of Italy, which had belonged to the Austrian empire until 1918, Mackensen repeatedly promised Mussolini that Germany regarded the frontier on the Brenner Pass as the established one and had no interest in South Tyrol. At the same time that Germany was starting to harshly criticise Czechoslovakia for its treatment of the people of the German-speaking Sudetenland, negotiations were started for a plan to expel the German population of South Tyrol into the Reich. Although the German population of South Tyrol was the worst treated German-speaking minority in Europe where even speaking German in public was a criminal offense, the Nazi regime had no interest in South Tyrol, which stood in very marked contrast to the situation with the Sudetenland.

Hitler was highly concerned about the Anglo-Italian negotiations that led to the Easter Accords of 1938 as marking the start of a possible Anglo-Italian rapprochement. Mackensen was kept well informed about the state of the Anglo-Italian talks by Count Ciano. Under the Easter Accords, Britain accepted the claim of King Victor Emmanuel III to be emperor of Ethiopia, accepting the Italian annexation of Ethiopia, in return for which the Italians promised to start pulling their forces out of Spain. Mackensen reported to Berlin that the Easter Accords did not mark the beginning of better Anglo-Italian relations, saying that Mussolini just wanted the British to stop recognizing Haile Selassie as the rightful emperor of Ethiopia. On 25 August 1939, Mackensen personally delivered a letter to Mussolini from Hitler, stating that Europe was on the brink of war, saying Germany would invade Poland at any time and expected Italy to honor the Pact of Steel.

On 30 January 1942 the German ambassador to Rome nevertheless received the considerable honour of being appointed an SS Group Leader ("Gruppenführer") on the staff of Reichsführer-SS Heinrich Himmler. In March 1943, Mackensen submitted a note to Ciano asking that the Italian government hand over all of the Jews living in the Italian occupied zone of France to be deported to the death camps. When his request was refused, Mackensen wrote in a dispatch to Berlin that the Italians were "too soft" to handle the "Jewish Question" properly, saying the Italian people were governed by "a sentimental humanitarianism, which is not in accord with our harsh epoch".

=== Military crisis and consequences ===
The Anglo-American invasion of Sicily in July 1943 brought forward various crises for Benito Mussolini, including a crisis in his relationship with his dictator-ally in Berlin. On 25 July 1943, following a (completely unprecedented) overnight vote of no confidence by the Grand Council of Fascism, the king found the courage to dismiss Mussolini and, four days later, had him arrested. The king told Pietro Badoglio that he would shortly be sworn in as the new prime minister, but in the event it would be around six weeks before Badoglio took formal control over what remained of Italy: in the intervening weeks confusion and uncertainty reigned in Rome. Around Adolf Hitler there was consternation, even before Mussolini's dismissal, over the disastrous performance and poor morale of the Italian army. The German army could, they believed, defend the Italian peninsular successfully, but for that they would need Mussolini's support. Mussolini failed either to galvanise his own generals or to provide his ally with clear answers, and a group of advisors around Hitler, led by the army chief, General Alfred Jodl, urged him to send an ultimatum to Mussolini, insisting on the need for agreement before 15 July 1943. Failing that, Mussolini needed to take drastic and immediate steps himself to arrest and reverse the deteriorating military situation. The German ambassador in Italy, Hans Georg von Mackensen, was naturally involved in these discussions, and suggested that the hugely admired Field Marshal Rommel might be given military command over Italy. The crisis culminated in a hastily arranged meeting at Feltre (near Belluno in northern Italy) between Hitler and Mussolini which took place on 19 July 1943, less than a week before Mussolini's dismissal by his king. The meeting was not a success, in that the dictators were evidently both surprised and disappointed by one another. Most of the time together was taken up with a furious two-hour harangue by Adolf Hitler. Since the facts on the ground and reactions to them in Rome and Berlin were highly fluid over the next few days, the details of the differing opinions between Adolf Hitler and Hans Georg von Mackensen that the crisis drew out are not entirely clear. What is clear is that on 2 August 1943, following a talk with Hitler, Mackensen was relieved of his post.

== Personal life ==
On 10 August 1926 Mackensen married Winifred Christine Helene Baroness of Neurath (1904–1985) at the Leinfelder Hof just outside the small town of Vaihingen (near Stuttgart). He thereby became the son-in-law of Konstantin von Neurath (1873–1956), a long-standing friend of his father's and now a rising star in the diplomatic service: Baron von Neurath would later become Germany's Foreign Minister. Back in 1916, at the height of the First World War, when she was aged just eleven, Winifred had presented a bunch of flowers to the glamorous young hussar Hans Georg von Mackensen, on his return from a mission to Constantinople. The glamour and extent of the celebrations in 1926, along with the presence of various members of the pre-1918 traditionalist-monarchist elite, hinted at a political or dynastic dimension to the union.

== Later life and death ==
He nevertheless retained his position as a general in the SS. That was the capacity in which he participated at the Group Leaders' congress, held during the first week of October 1943 in the city hall at Posen (the German name for Poznań). He was thereby able to hear for himself the first of the subsequently infamous Posen speeches delivered by Himmler.

In May 1945 he was captured by French forces and held as a prisoner of war till April 1946. Mackensen's efforts to pressure the Italians to hand over the Jews living in the Italian-occupied zone of France led to his being considered a possible war criminal by the French authorities; only the fact that the Italians had refused all of his requests saved him from being indicted as a war criminal. Following his release he remained in the French occupation zone, dying in a Konstanz hospital on 28 September 1947. He had been a top official at the German Foreign Ministry in 1938, at the time of the German invasion of Czechoslovakia.

He had been scheduled to appear at a forthcoming trial as a witness on German-Italian negotiations during the build-up to that invasion. His death from lung cancer meant that he was spared the court appearance.

== Books and articles ==
- Goda, Norman (2006). Tales from Spandau Nazi Criminals and the Cold War. Cambridge: Cambridge University Press. ISBN 9780521867207.
- Jacobsen, Hans-Adolf (1999). "The Structure of Nazi Foreign Policy, 1933-1945". In Christian Leitz (ed.). The Third Reich The Essential Readings. Blackwell. pp. 49–94. ISBN 9-780631-207009.
- Röhl, John (1994). The Kaiser and his Court. Cambridge: Cambridge University Press.
- Preker, Simon (2021). "Illegitimate Representatives: Manchukuo-German Relations and Diplomatic Struggles in Nazi Germany". In Joanne Miyang Cho (ed.). Sino-German Encounters and Entanglements Transnational Politics and Culture, 1890–1950. Oxford: Springer. pp. 289–308. ISBN 9783030733919.
- Weinberg, Gerhard (2010). Hitler's Foreign Policy, 1933-1939 The Road to World War II. New York: Enigma Books. ISBN 9781929631919.
