= Rehman Chishti =

British Conservative politician, former MP for Gillingham and Rainham

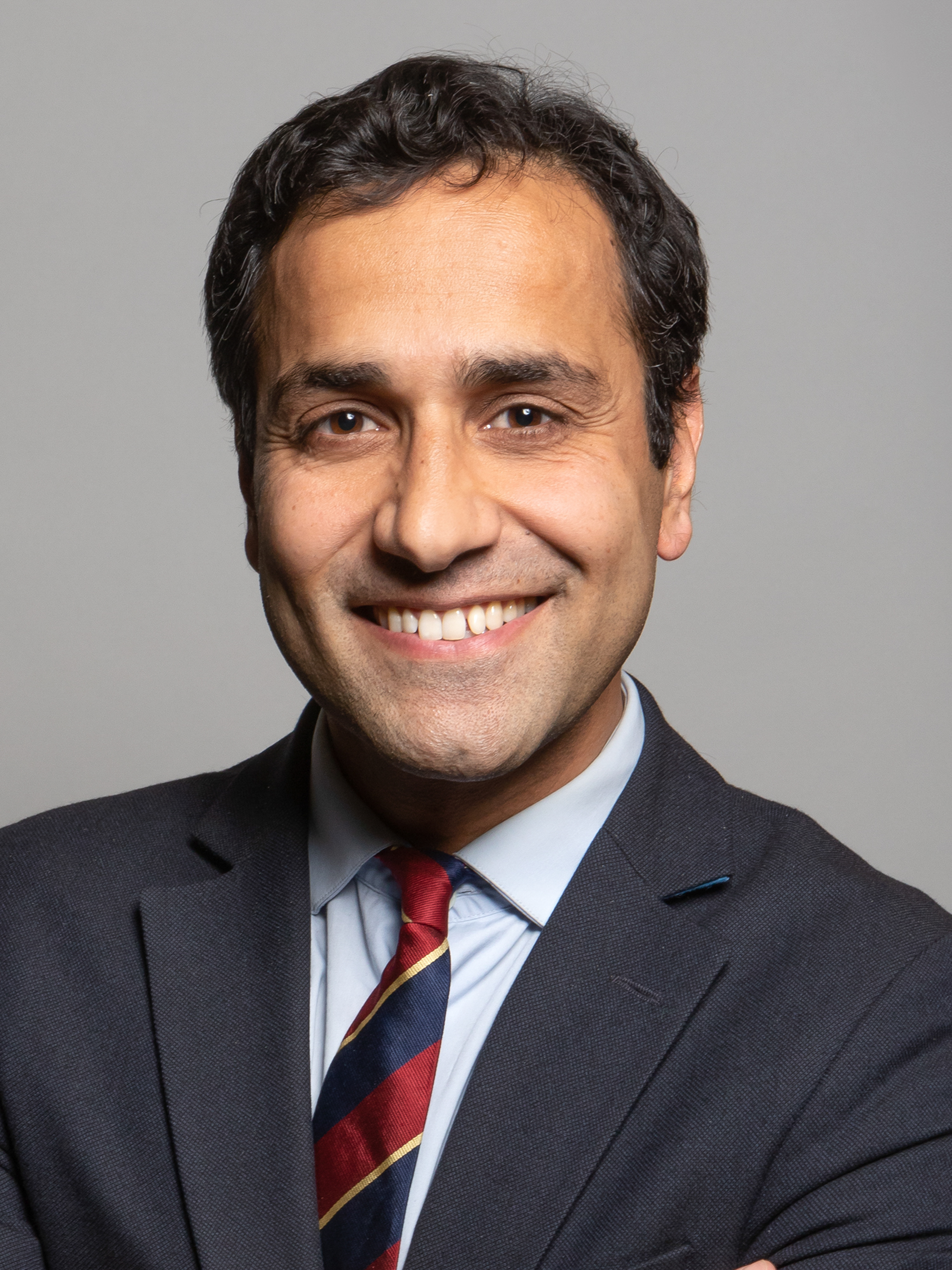
- Official portrait, 2020

Parliamentary Under-Secretary of State for North America, Sanctions and Consular Policy
- In office 8 July 2022 – 7 September 2022
- Prime Minister: Boris Johnson
- Preceded by: James Cleverly
- Succeeded by: Jesse Norman

Prime Minister's Special Envoy for Freedom of Religion or Belief
- In office 12 September 2019 – 14 September 2020
- Prime Minister: Boris Johnson
- Preceded by: Lord Tariq Ahmad
- Succeeded by: Fiona Bruce

Vice Chair of the Conservative Party for Communities
- In office 8 January 2018 – 15 November 2018
- Leader: Theresa May
- Preceded by: Position established
- Succeeded by: Helen Grant

Member of Parliament for Gillingham and Rainham
- In office 6 May 2010 – 30 May 2024
- Preceded by: Paul Clark (Gillingham) (Note: The Gillingham constituency was renamed "Gillingham and Rainham", with minor boundary changes, at the 2010 general election)
- Succeeded by: Naushabah Khan

Cabinet Member of Medway Council for Community Safety and Enforcement
- In office 2007–2010

Member of Medway Council for Rainham Central
- In office 1 May 2003 – 2 May 2019
- Constituency: Gillingham North (2003–2007); Rainham Central (2007–2019)

Personal details
- Born: Atta-Ur-Rehman Chishti; 4 October 1978 (age 47) Muzaffarabad, Pakistan
- Party: Conservative (2006–present)
- Other political affiliations: Labour (until 2006)
- Spouse: Alessandra (m. 2024)
- Education: Aberystwyth University (LLB)
- Awards: Sitara-i-Quaid-i-Azam (2020)
- Website: Official website

Military service
- Allegiance: United Kingdom
- Branch/service: British Army
- Years of service: 2020–2022
- Unit: Army Reserve

Atta-Ur-Rehman Chishti (born 4 October 1978) is a British Conservative politician who was the Member of Parliament (MP) for Gillingham and Rainham from 2010 until 2024. He was one of 11 candidates in the July 2022 leadership contest to replace Boris Johnson as leader of the Conservative Party and prime minister.

He served under Theresa May as both the Vice Chair of the Conservative Party for Communities in 2018 and the Prime Ministerial Trade Envoy to Pakistan from 2017 to 2018. Between 2019 and 2020, he also served as Prime Minister's Special Envoy for Freedom of Religion or Belief. He served as Parliamentary Under-Secretary of State for North America, Sanctions and Consular Policy from July to September 2022.

== Early life and career ==
Chishti was born in Muzaffarabad, the capital of Azad Kashmir, Pakistan, on 4 October 1978. His father, Abdul Rehman Chishti, had been appointed as Federal Adviser on religious affairs to the Prime Minister of Azad Kashmir in 1976 by Zulfikar Ali Bhutto, the Prime Minister of Pakistan. His father left Pakistan in 1978 to take up a post as an Imam in the UK; soon after, Bhutto was overthrown by a military coup by General Zia-ul-Haq, who later executed Bhutto. Rehman Chishti did not see his father for the first six years of his life. He, along with his mother and elder sister joined his father in 1984 in the UK at the age of six arriving on a British Airways 747 flight, and since then has lived in Gillingham and Rainham.

Chishti attended Richmond Infant School (now Burnt Oak Primary school), Napier Primary School, Fort Luton High School for Boys (now Victory Academy), Rainham Mark Grammar School Sixth Form, and Chatham Grammar School for Girls (mixed boys and girls sixth form). He played cricket for his school and for Medway District and Kent Schools.

Chishti studied law at University of Wales Aberystwyth, followed by studies at the Inns of Court School of Law where he did his barrister's vocational course.

Chishti was called to the Bar of England and Wales by Lincoln's Inn in 2001. He undertook pupillage at Goldsmith Chambers and was taken on as a tenant. Chishti prosecuted and defended cases in the Magistrates' and Crown courts. He has appeared in the Court of Appeal: R v R [2007] EWCA Crim 3312; Attorney General's Reference (No. 20 of 2005), R v May [2005] All ER (D) 359 (Jun). He is an Honorary Door Tenant at Red Lion Chambers.

== Political career ==
=== Adviser to Benazir Bhutto ===
Chishti served as a political adviser from 1999–2007 to Benazir Bhutto, after she had ceased being the Prime Minister of Pakistan. In September 2004 in a meeting in Islamabad with Mark Lyall Grant, the then High Commissioner to Pakistan, Chishti, acting on behalf of Benazir Bhutto, committed Bhutto to talks with the Government of Pakistan for the transition to democracy with the United Kingdom acting as the facilitators. Chishti followed this up by attending every meeting Bhutto had with British diplomats, both in Dubai and London, including the British Foreign Office in London accompanying Bhutto and acting on her behalf. This included meetings with the then British Foreign Secretary Jack Straw in 2005, and David Miliband in 2007.

=== Parliamentary candidate and councillor ===
At the 2005 general election, Chishti stood as the Labour Party candidate for the Horsham constituency. He later joined the Conservative Party, and was selected as the candidate for the marginal seat of Gillingham and Rainham, whose predecessor seat of Gillingham had been held by Labour by less than 300 votes in 2005.

Chishti was elected as a Labour member for Gillingham North ward on Medway Council in 2003. At the following council election in 2007, he was elected to represent Rainham Central ward as a Conservative. Having become the Conservative MP for the area in 2010, he was re-elected as a councillor for Rainham Central in 2011 and 2015. He stood down at the 2019 council election. He was appointed to the Medway Council's Cabinet in 2007 as the Member for Community Safety and Enforcement, becoming the youngest Cabinet Member in Medway's history. He also served as an Adviser to Francis Maude (against whom Chishti had stood in Horsham in 2005) on diversity when Maude was Chairman of the Conservative Party in 2006.

=== Member of Parliament ===
Chishti was elected Member of Parliament for Gillingham and Rainham in 2010 at the age of 31. The New Statesman listed Chishti as among the 20 MPs under 40 who are the best of their generation, and who have the potential to be the next prime minister. The Sunday Telegraph newspaper described him as a rising star of the party. In 2011, Chishti was listed by the BBC as one of the most frequent speakers in Parliament from the intake of 2010.

In 2013, Chishti was named parliamentarian of the year by the road safety charity Brake for his work in Parliament championing road safety issues, including persuading the government to adopt his private members bill to increase the sentence for those who cause death by driving, when then the motorist had been banned from driving at the time of the offence. The government agreed to increase the maximum custodial sentence to 10 years from the previous two.

Chishti has campaigned for the release of Asia Bibi, a Christian mother of five who has been accused of blasphemy in Pakistan. In October 2014, Chishti authored a letter, signed by 54 MPs from across Parliament, sent to the Prime Minister of Pakistan, Nawaz Sharif, and the Chief Justice, Nasir-ul-Mulk, calling for an urgent review of her case.

In June 2015, Chishti authored letters signed by more than 120 MPs to the Prime Minister and to the BBC asking them to refer to the so-called "Islamic State", ISIS/ISIL as "Daesh", a phrase adopted by many countries around the world, including France and Turkey, an issue which made front-page news. In December 2015, the Prime Minister announced in Parliament that, after the strong representations made by Chishti, the Government would be officially using the terminology Daesh, rather than ISIL.

Chishti has campaigned to improve care for people with mental health problems and has introduced two Private Members Bills in Parliament. In October 2015 he authored a letter, signed by 67 MPs, sent to the Prime Minister asking the Government to support these.

Chishti was a Member of the Justice Select Committee of the House of Commons, having previously been a Member of the Joint Committee of the Human Rights Committee. He is passionate about sports and has served as the parliamentary fellow for Sport England, and is currently the parliamentary fellow for The Football Association.

In July 2014, Chishti was made Parliamentary Private Secretary to Nick Gibb, the Minister of State for Education. In May 2015, he took a similar position with Jeremy Wright, the Attorney General.

In 2015, Chishti was awarded the Conservative Party People's Choice MP of the Year Award from the Patchwork Foundation for his community engagement work and was named in second place by readers of the ConservativeHome blog in their Parliamentarian of the Year 2015.

He led the campaign to give Asia Bibi asylum in the UK and in November 2018 authored a letter signed by 125 parliamentarians from across the house calling on the Government to offer her asylum. He resigned his position as a Vice Chairman of the Conservative Party citing the failure of the Government to offer Asia Bibi asylum as one of the reasons, as well as disagreement over the European Union Withdrawal Agreement.

In March 2016, Chishti became an adviser to the King Faisal Center for Research and Islamic Studies, a role for which he was paid £200 an hour. The King Faisal Centre is a Saudi Arabian think-tank, named after the Saudi King Faisal. In recent years the organisation has aimed to have more of an international presence and to "affect policy based on public research". The Liberal Democrats criticised him for advancing Saudi Arabia's interests through making speeches in Parliament while at the same time being on the pay-roll of a Saudi think-tank.

=== PM's Special Envoy on Freedom of Religion or Belief ===
On 13 September 2019, UK Prime Minister Boris Johnson appointed Chishti the new Special Envoy on Freedom of Religion or Belief, as the single dedicated person leading on FoRB in the Foreign and Commonwealth Office. Chishti assumed the role in a time of renewed focus on international religious freedom, with the United States Government under the leader of US Vice President Michael Pence and Secretary of State Michael Pompeo initiating the Ministerial to Advance Religious Freedom. Chishti was tasked with implementing the recommendations in the Bishop of Truro's Report on Persecuted Christians, as well as championing a firm stance on Freedom of Religion or Belief for all, which was a top priority for the Government, as made clear by the Prime Minister Boris Johnson in response to a question by Chishti during a Commons debate in October 2019.

On 15 September 2020, Chishti resigned as special envoy on freedom of religion or belief in protest at the Internal Market Bill. In his resignation letter, Chishti said that his resignation was a matter of principle, regarding specifically his respect for the rule of law, hence why he could not agree to the initial drafting of the IMB, which would have enabled Ministers and Government unilaterally to withdraw from commitments with the European Union and breach international law. In the same letter, Chishti made clear his deeply held convictions of respect for the rule of law and honouring commitments, and that he had suggested to the government that they should accept an amendment by Conservative MP Bob Neill that would have enabled Parliamentary scrutiny and oversight, thereby respecting Parliamentary sovereignty before the UK Government ever considered departing from an agreement approved by Parliament. The Government had initially not accepted the amendment, but later did accept it along with Chishti's advice for a full debate on the matter, thereby ensuring Parliamentary sovereignty.

=== Leadership bid ===
On 10 July 2022 Chishti announced his bid to succeed Boris Johnson in the Conservative Party leadership election. He withdrew two days later, having failed to win the support of any other Conservative MPs, before endorsing Tom Tugendhat and subsequently Rishi Sunak. He had been appointed Parliamentary Under-Secretary of State for North America, Sanctions and Consular Policy on 8 July 2022 by Prime Minister Boris Johnson, but was sacked by Liz Truss when she succeeded him in September 2022.

=== 2024 General Election ===
Chishti stood as the candidate for the Conservative party in the 2024 general election but lost his seat in the Gillingham and Rainham constituency to the Labour candidate Naushabah Khan, who won with a 21.3% swing.

=== Brexit ===
For the 2016 referendum on Britain's membership to the European Union, Chisti voted to Leave, having made it clear he had taken that decision after listening to his constituents who voted almost 65% in favour of Leave.

Chishti resigned his post as Special Envoy for Freedom of Religion or Belief on 14 September 2020 in opposition to the Government's suggestion that it could breach international law on the withdrawal agreement's protocol on Northern Ireland. He tweeted: "I've written to the PM resigning as PM's Special Envoy on FoRB. I can't support Internal Market Bill in its current form, which unilaterally break UK's legal commitments."

=== Private Members Bills and Presentation Bills ===
Health Services Commissioning (Equality and Accountability) Bill – aimed to require health care commissioners to take full account of mental health needs when making decisions on care. This would require those who commission health services to always consider how their services meet the needs of people with mental health problems.

Drink Driving Bill – called for the Magistrates Court to be able to use their discretion to refer a third or subsequent offence for drink driving to the Crown Court for sentencing and to grant the Crown Court the jurisdiction to give a custodial sentence of up to two years. The road safety charity Brake presented Chishti with a national award for his Bill and campaigning on this issue.

Laser Pens Bill – aimed to make the sale, ownership and use of certain portable laser devices unlawful in certain circumstances, and was also supported by the British Airline Pilots Association and a number of airports. Key aspects of Chishti's Bill were adopted by the Government in January 2018.

Cats Bill – Chishti presented his Cats Bill to Parliament in July 2018, launching a campaign calling for the compulsory microchipping and reporting of injured cats following a road accident. His Bill has the support of a wide range of animal charities including Cats Protection, Cats Matter, the Battersea Dog and Cat Home, and Animals Lost and Found in Kent. In December 2018, Chishti held a debate in Westminster Hall on Cat Welfare which was supported by MPs from across the House.

== Post-parliamentary career ==
Following his defeat at the 2024 general election, Chishti has worked as a freelance strategic advisor. He is also a Visiting Professor at the University of Oklahoma and the London School of Economics.

== Personal life ==
Chishti is a practising Muslim and the son of an Imam. He took his first oath of allegiance on a Quran with the Torah and the King James Bible placed on the Despatch Box to show reverence to other faiths.

Chishti was married to Alessandra in July 2024 in an Islamic ceremony.

== See also ==
- Pakistan–United Kingdom relations

== Notes ==
Parliament of the United Kingdom
Preceded by Paul Clark (Gillingham)	Member of Parliament for Gillingham and Rainham; 2010–2024	Succeeded by Naushabah Khan
