= John Jenkins (British politician) =

British politician (1852–1936)

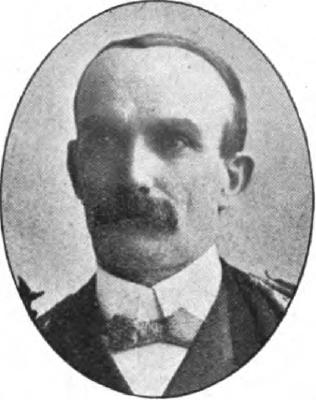
Jenkins in the mid-1900s

John Hogan Jenkins (1852–1936) was a Welsh trade unionist and politician. He was mayor of Cardiff (1903–04), President of the Trades Union Congress (1895–96) and Member of Parliament (MP) for Chatham, Kent (1906–1910).

== Biography ==
Jenkins was born in Pembroke on 27 May 1852. A shipwright by trade, he spent most of his life in Cardiff. He was firstly a Liberal-Labour and then Labour Party politician.

Driven by strong Methodist Christian principles, he founded a Shipwrights Society in Cardiff, becoming its president. He helped found several other trade unions. He became President of the Trades Union Congress in 1895.

In 1900 he was elected to Cardiff Council and was Mayor of Cardiff from 1903 to 1904.

With his background in shipbuilding, Jenkins launched his campaign in 1904 to become Member of Parliament (MP) for the English port town of Chatham in Kent. The seat was held by the Conservative Party and Jenkins was standing against Conservative mayor Major Jameson. The campaign was rough at times, but Jenkins built up a strong loyal base of supporters. He was elected as MP at the 1906 general election. Jenkins was unexpectedly defeated at the January 1910 election by the Conservative Party candidate, Gerald Hohler, who ran a compelling campaign to improve the British navy. The local Chatham newspaper in 1910 ran the headline "Surprising Defeat of Alderman Jenkins". Jenkins did not stand for Parliament again.

Trade union offices
Preceded by Frank Delves	President of the Trades Union Congress; 1895	Succeeded by John Mallinson
Parliament of the United Kingdom
Preceded by Horatio Davies	Member of Parliament for Chatham; 1906 – January 1910	Succeeded by Gerald Hohler
