= Lewis Vivian Loyd =

British Conservative Party politician

Colonel Lewis Vivian Loyd DL (14 November 1852 – 21 September 1908) was a British Conservative Party politician.

He was elected at the 1892 general election as the Member of Parliament (MP) for Chatham in Kent, but did not seek re-election in 1895, and did not stand for Parliament again.

He was married on 14 August 1879 to Lady Mary Sophia Hely Hutchinson (1854–1936), daughter of 4th Earl of Donoughmore, a writer and translator with whom he had three children: two sons and a daughter. From his father's second cousin Samuel Jones Loyd, 1st Baron Overstone (1796–1883) he inherited the manor of Withybrook, Wolvey in Warwickshire, and the estate passed on his death to his oldest son Lewis Richard Loyd.

Parliament of the United Kingdom
Preceded by John Eldon Gorst	Member of Parliament for Chatham; 1892 – 1895	Succeeded by Horatio Davies
