= Paul Clark (British politician) =

British Labour Party politician

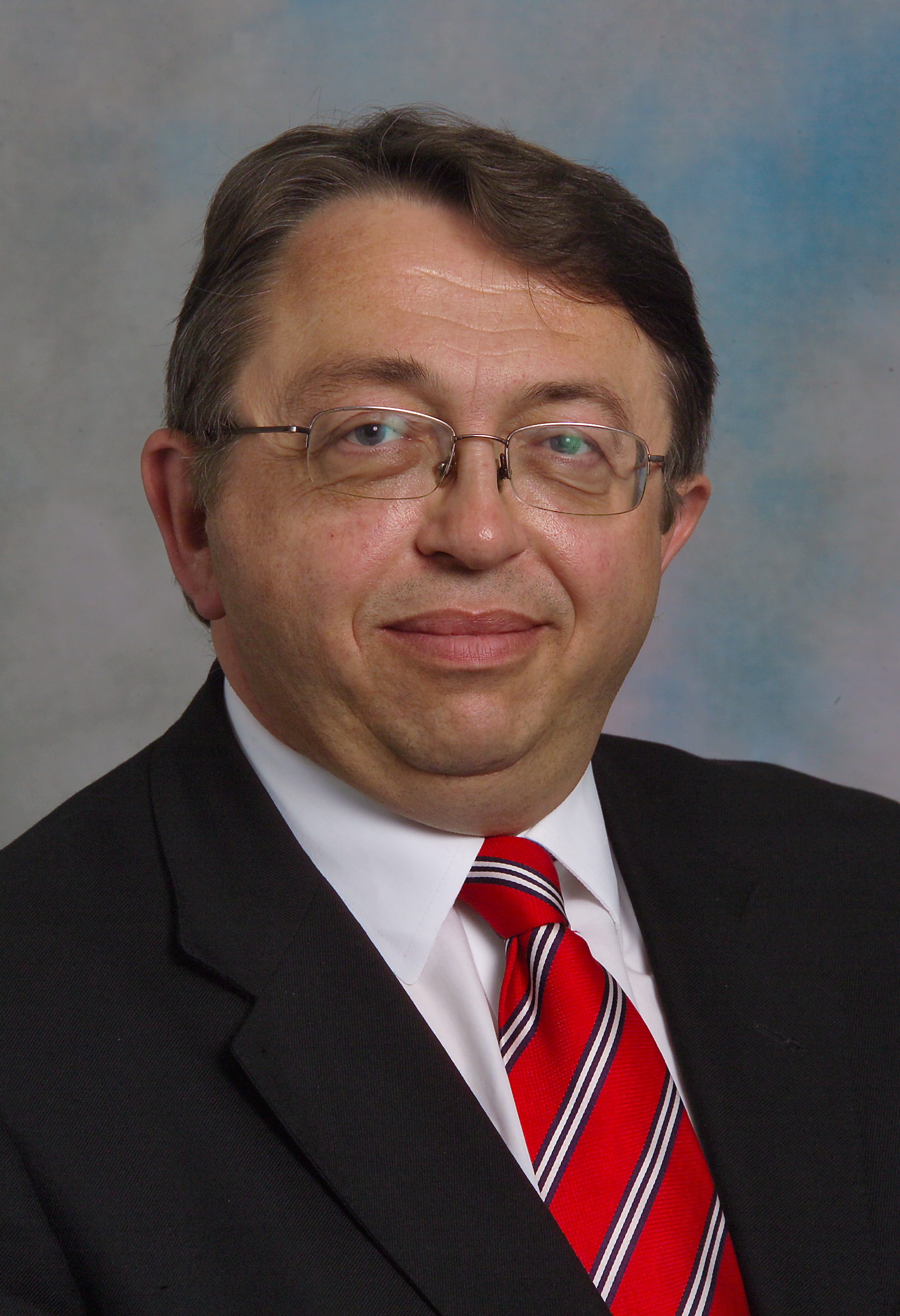
- Official portrait, 2008

Parliamentary Under-Secretary of State for Transport
- In office 5 October 2008 – 11 May 2010
- Prime Minister: Gordon Brown
- Preceded by: Tom Harris
- Succeeded by: Norman Baker

Parliamentary Private Secretary to the Deputy Prime Minister
- In office 6 May 2005 – 27 June 2007
- Appointed by: John Prescott
- Preceded by: David Watts
- Succeeded by: Norman Lamb (Note: Office vacant from 27 June 2007 to 12 May 2010.)

Member of Parliament for Gillingham
- In office 1 May 1997 – 12 April 2010
- Preceded by: James Couchman
- Succeeded by: Rehman Chishti (Gillingham and Rainham) (Note: The Gillingham constituency was renamed "Gillingham and Rainham", with minor boundary changes, at the 2010 general election)

Member of Gillingham Borough Council for Twydall
- In office 6 May 1982 – 3 May 1990

Personal details
- Born: 29 April 1957 (age 69) Gillingham, Kent, England
- Party: Labour
- Education: Keele University; University of Derby

Paul Gordon Clark (born 29 April 1957) is a British former Labour Party politician and who was the Member of Parliament (MP) for Gillingham from 1997 to 2010. During his time in government, Clark served as Parliamentary Private Secretary to Derry Irvine, Charles Falconer, John Prescott, and Ed Balls, before being promoted in 2008 to the role of Parliamentary Under Secretary of State at the Department for Transport. At the 2010 general election Clark was defeated by the Conservative Party candidate Rehman Chishti in the newly formed constituency of Gillingham and Rainham.

In 2022, Clark pleaded guilty to possessing and distributing indecent images of children. In May 2023, he was sentenced to two years and four months in prison.

== Education ==
Clark was educated at Featherby Infants and Junior Schools and Gillingham Grammar School. He went on to gain a BA in economics and politics at Keele University in 1980. At university he became a sabbatical officer as Student Union Secretary. Later he studied for a diploma in management studies at the University of Derby in 1997. In 2011 Clark was awarded an honorary doctorate by the University of Greenwich.

== Career ==
Clark first became MP for Gillingham in the Labour landslide in the 1997 general election where he overturned a Conservative majority of 16,638. He had two further successful campaigns for Parliament in 2001 and 2005. Before becoming MP for Gillingham he had been on Gillingham Borough Council from 1982 until 1990 as a Labour councillor. From 1983 until 1989 he was deputy leader of the local party, and was elected leader in 1989. In 1990 he was elected by the Gillingham Labour Party to stand as the parliamentary candidate. His career prior to becoming an MP was with the AEEU and then the TUC.

After being elected in 1997 Clark was PPS to Lord Irvine of Lairg, the Lord Chancellor, then PPS to Lord Falconer of Thoroton in the Department for Transport and later the Home Office. Clark was finally promoted to the Whips' office between 2003 and 2005. After the 2005 election he became PPS to deputy prime minister John Prescott until 2007, then PPS to Ed Balls in the Department for Children, Schools and Families. In October 2008 he was promoted to Parliamentary Under Secretary of State for the Department of Transport, where his responsibilities included international networks, road safety and motoring and freight services agencies.

After leaving Parliament Clark established Gateway Associates, a lobbying firm.

In 2013 Clark was selected by Gillingham and Rainham Labour Party as PPC for the 2015 general election.

In 2013, Clark sat as a lay member of Keele University Council, until his term ended in 2020.

In 2017 Clark announced that he would not be running in that year's general election.

== Child abuse images conviction ==
Clark was arrested in May 2021 on suspicion of creating and distributing child abuse images. Police discovered more than 1,400 indecent images of children on Clark's devices. In December 2022, he pleaded guilty to three counts of making indecent images of children and six counts of distributing indecent images of children between April 2013 and May 2021. On 12 May 2023, he was sentenced to two years and four months in prison.

== Notes ==
Parliament of the United Kingdom
Preceded by James Couchman	Member of Parliament for Gillingham; 1997–2010	Constituency abolished see Gillingham & Rainham
