= Gillingham and Rainham =

UK Parliament constituency (since 2010)

Coordinates: 51°22′N 0°34′E

- Borough constituency for the House of Commons
- Interactive map of boundaries from 2024
- Boundary of Gillingham and Rainham in South East England
- County: Kent
- Electorate: 73,951 (2023)
- Major settlements: Gillingham; Rainham; Twydall

Current constituency
- Created: 2010
- Member of Parliament: Naushabah Khan (Labour)
- Seats: One
- Created from: Gillingham

Gillingham and Rainham is a constituency (Note: A borough constituency (for the purposes of election expenses and type of returning officer)) in Kent represented in the House of Commons of the UK Parliament since 2024 by Naushabah Khan of the Labour Party. (Note: As with all constituencies, the constituency elects one Member of Parliament (MP) by the first past the post system of election at least every five years.) It was previously represented since its 2010 creation by Rehman Chishti of the Conservative Party and replaced the previous constituency of Gillingham.

== Constituency profile ==
Gillingham and Rainham is a generally suburban constituency located in the borough of Medway in Kent. It contains the connected towns and villages of Gillingham, Rainham, Twydall, Hempstead and Wigmore. Gillingham is an important commercial centre for the region, and employment in the town was traditionally focused on the Royal Navy's Chatham Dockyard, which lies just outside the constituency's boundaries. High levels of deprivation are present in Gillingham, which contains mostly terraced housing. Rainham, Wigmore and Hempstead are generally affluent and suburban in character with mostly detached or semi-detached housing. The average house price in the constituency is low compared to the rest of South East England and marginally lower than the national average.

In general, residents of the constituency have low levels of education and professional employment. Average household income is similar to the rest of the country but lower than the regional average. White people made up 84% of the population at the 2021 census, a similar proportion to the country as a whole. At the local council, Gillingham is represented by the Labour Party whilst the rest of the constituency elected Conservatives. Voters strongly supported leaving the European Union in the 2016 referendum, with an estimated 62% voting in favour of Brexit compared to 52% nationwide.

== Boundaries ==
2010–2023: The Borough of Medway wards of Gillingham North, Gillingham South, Hempstead and Wigmore, Rainham Central, Rainham North, Rainham South, Twydall and Watling.

2023–present: Further to a local government boundary review which came into effect in May 2023, the constituency now comprises the following wards of the Borough of Medway:

- Gillingham North (nearly all); Gillingham South; Hempstead & Wigmore (nearly all); Rainham North; Rainham South East; Rainham South West; Twydall; Watling.

The 2023 Periodic Review of Westminster constituencies, which was based on the ward structure in place at 1 December 2020, left the boundaries unchanged.

== Members of Parliament ==
Gillingham prior to 2010

Election	Member	Party
2010	Rehman Chishti	Conservative
2024	Naushabah Khan	Labour

== Elections ==
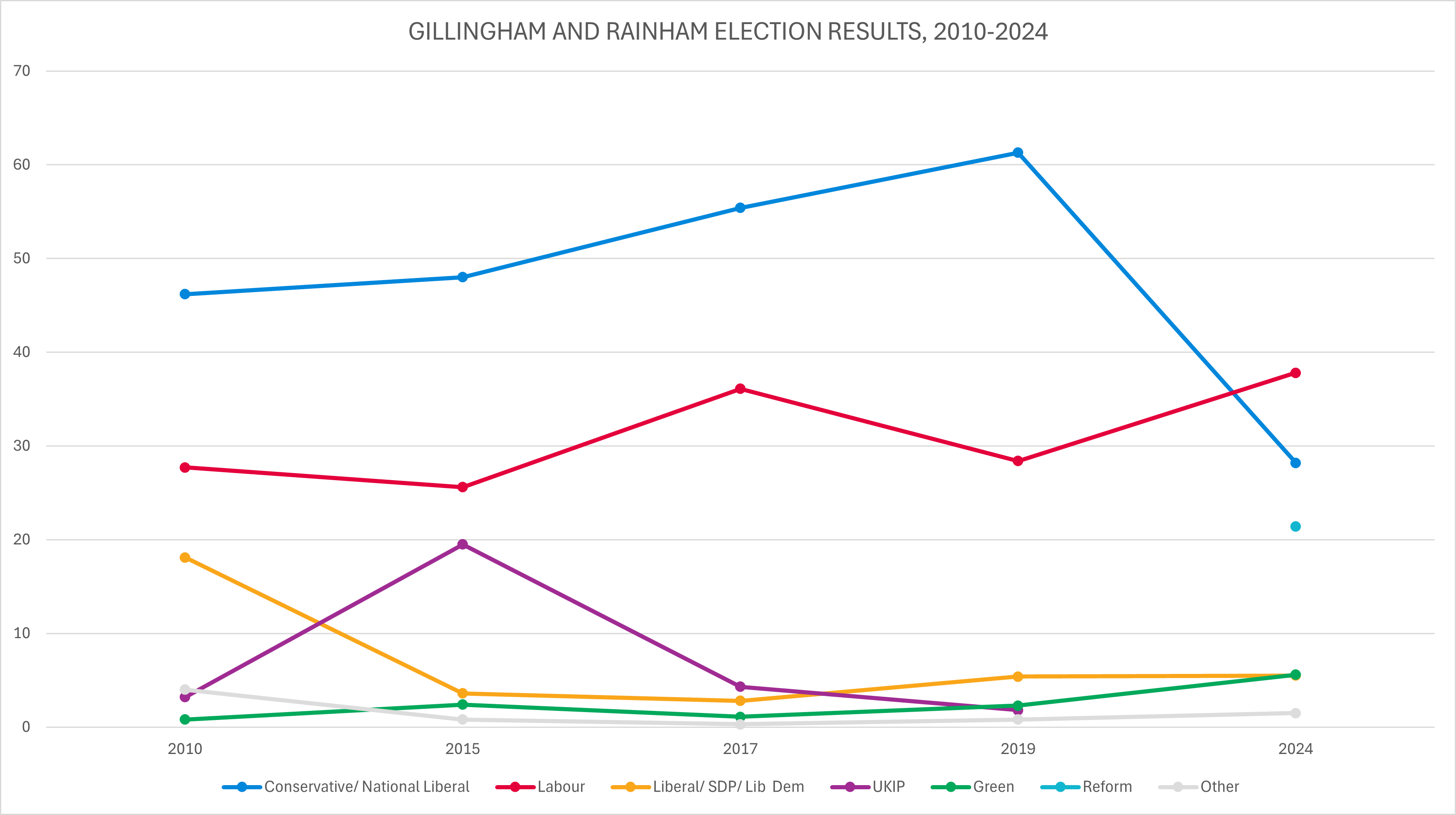
Election results 2010-2024

=== Elections in the 2020s ===
General election 2024: Gillingham and Rainham
Party	Candidate	Votes	%	±%
Labour	Naushabah Khan	15,562	37.8	+9.4
Conservative	Rehman Chishti	11,590	28.2	−33.1
Reform UK	Rizvi Rawoof	8,792	21.4	N/A
Green	Kate Belmonte	2,318	5.6	+3.3
Liberal Democrats	Stuart Bourne	2,248	5.5	+0.1
Independent	Peter Cook	344	0.8	+0.3
CPA	Roger Peacock	175	0.4	+0.1
SDP	Peter Wheeler	111	0.3	N/A
Majority		3,972	9.6	N/A
Turnout		41,140	55.9	−6.1
Registered electors		73,523		
Labour gain from Conservative		Swing	▲21.3	

=== Elections in the 2010s ===
General election 2019: Gillingham and Rainham
Party	Candidate	Votes	%	±%
Conservative	Rehman Chishti	28,173	61.3	+5.9
Labour	Andy Stamp	13,054	28.4	–7.7
Liberal Democrats	Alan Bullion	2,503	5.4	+2.6
Green	George Salomon	1,043	2.3	+1.2
UKIP	Rob Martin	837	1.8	–2.5
Independent	Peter Cook	229	0.5	N/A
CPA	Roger Peacock	119	0.3	0.0
Majority		15,119	32.9	+13.6
Turnout		45,958	62.5	–4.4
Conservative hold		Swing	+6.8	

General election 2017: Gillingham and Rainham
Party	Candidate	Votes	%	±%
Conservative	Rehman Chishti	27,091	55.4	+7.4
Labour	Andy Stamp	17,661	36.1	+10.5
UKIP	Martin Cook	2,097	4.3	–15.2
Liberal Democrats	Paul Chaplin	1,372	2.8	–0.8
Green	Clive Gregory	520	1.1	–1.3
CPA	Roger Peacock	127	0.3	N/A
Majority		9,430	19.3	–3.1
Turnout		48,868	66.9	+2.1
Conservative hold		Swing	–1.5	

General election 2015: Gillingham and Rainham
Party	Candidate	Votes	%	±%
Conservative	Rehman Chishti	22,590	48.0	+1.8
Labour	Paul Clark	12,060	25.6	–2.1
UKIP	Mark Hanson	9,199	19.5	+16.3
Liberal Democrats	Paul Chaplin	1,707	3.6	–14.5
Green	Neil Williams	1,133	2.4	+1.6
TUSC	Jacqui Berry	273	0.6	N/A
Independent	Roger Peacock	72	0.1	N/A
Independent	Mike Walters	44	0.1	N/A
Majority		10,530	22.4	+3.9
Turnout		47,078	64.8	–1.2
Conservative hold		Swing	+1.9	

General election 2010: Gillingham and Rainham
Party	Candidate	Votes	%	±%
Conservative	Rehman Chishti	21,624	46.2	+5.5
Labour	Paul Clark	12,944	27.7	–13.1
Liberal Democrats	Andrew Stamp	8,484	18.1	+2.8
UKIP	Robert Oakley	1,515	3.2	+0.6
BNP	Brian Ravenscroft	1,149	2.5	N/A
English Democrat	Dean Lacey	464	1.0	N/A
Green	Trish Marchant	356	0.8	N/A
Independent	Gordon Bryan	141	0.3	N/A
Medway Independent Party	George Meegan	109	0.2	N/A
Majority		8,680	18.5	N/A
Turnout		46,786	66.0	+2.0
Conservative gain from Labour		Swing	+9.3	

Paul Clark was the incumbent MP for Gillingham.

== See also ==
- List of parliamentary constituencies in Kent
- List of parliamentary constituencies in the South East England (region)
