= Gerald Hohler =

British politician

Sir Gerald Hohler KC

Member of Parliament
- In office 1910 – 10 May 1929
- Preceded by: John Jenkins
- Succeeded by: Robert Gower
- Constituency: Chatham (1910–1918); Gillingham (1918–1929)

Personal details
- Born: Gerald Fitzroy Hohler; 29 August 1862 Banstead, Surrey, England
- Died: 30 January 1934 (aged 71) Stansted, Kent, England
- Party: Conservative
- Relatives: Thomas Hohler (brother)
- Education: Eton College
- Alma mater: Trinity College, Cambridge

Sir Gerald Fitzroy Hohler KC (29 August 1862 – 30 January 1934) was a British barrister and Conservative Party politician who served as a Member of Parliament (MP) for constituencies in Kent from 1910 to 1929.

He was born in Banstead, Surrey, the fourth son of Henry Booth Hohler and Henrietta Wilhelmina Lawes. His younger brother was diplomat Sir Thomas Hohler. Hohler was educated at Eton and Trinity College, Cambridge. He was called to the bar in 1888 at the Inner Temple, and practised on the South-Eastern Circuit. He became a King's Counsel (KC) in 1906.

== Political career ==
Hohler was elected at the January 1910 general election as the MP for Chatham, unseating the town's first Labour Party MP John Jenkins, and held the seat until the 1918 general election, when he was elected instead as a Coalition Conservative for the new Gillingham division of Rochester. He was returned to the House of Commons at a further three elections before standing down at the 1929 general election, having been knighted in 1924 in the resignation honours of Stanley Baldwin.

He died in Stansted, Kent, following an operation.

Parliament of the United Kingdom
Preceded by John Jenkins	Member of Parliament for Chatham; January 1910 – 1918	Succeeded by John Moore-Brabazon
New constituency	Member of Parliament for Gillingham; 1918 – 1929	Succeeded by Robert Gower
