= Robert Gower =

British solicitor and politician (1880–1953)

Sir Robert Gower
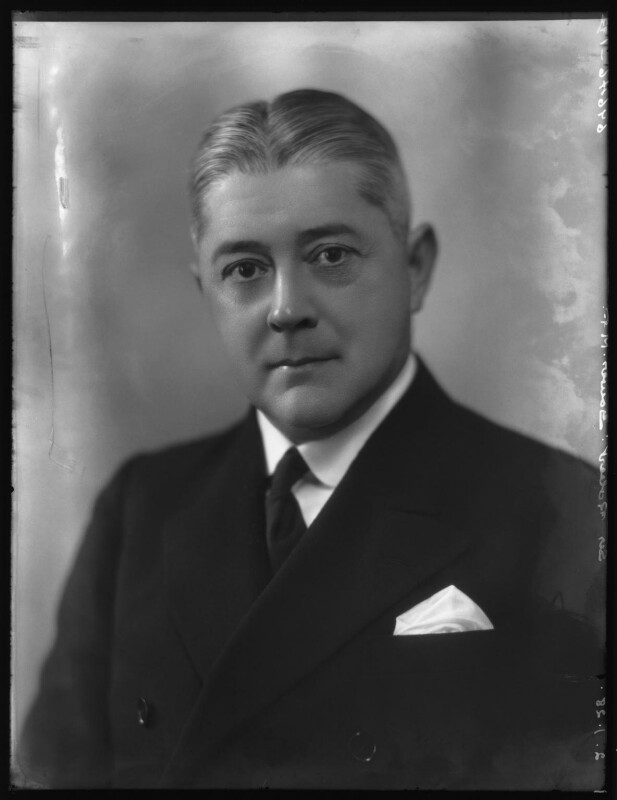
- Gower in 1928

Member of Parliament
- In office 29 October 1924 – 15 June 1945
- Preceded by: Leonard Franklin
- Succeeded by: Joseph Binns
- Constituency: Hackney Central (1924–1929); Gillingham (1929–1945)

Personal details
- Born: Robert Vaughan Gower; 10 November 1880
- Died: 6 March 1953 (aged 72)
- Party: Conservative
- Spouse: Dorothy Susie Eleanor Wills
- Children: 2, including Pauline

Sir Robert Vaughan Gower KCVO OBE FRGS (10 November 1880 – 6 March 1953) was a British solicitor and Conservative Party politician from Kent. He sat in the House of Commons from 1924 to 1945. He was most remembered for his work on behalf of animals; he was chairman of the RSPCA for 23 years before being elected president.

== Early life ==
The son of Joshua Robert Gower of Tunbridge Wells, and his wife Kate, daughter of John Fagge of Tonbridge, Robert Gower was admitted a solicitor in 1904. He was educated privately. In 1903, he obtained honours in the final examination of the Law Society. His younger daughter, Pauline Gower, headed the female branch of the Air Transport Auxiliary during the Second World War.

== Career ==
Mayor of Tunbridge Wells in 1918–1919, it was announced in the 1919 Birthday Honours that he was to be knighted for support he had given to a scheme for preserving businesses in the absence of those serving in World War I, The title was conferred in a ceremony at Buckingham Palace on 18 August 1919. He had previously been made an Officer of the Order of the British Empire (OBE) in the 1919 New Year Honours. He was also a Fellow of the Royal Geographical Society.

He was elected as the Member of Parliament (MP) for Hackney Central at the 1924 general election, a seat which had been held by the Liberal Party since 1906. He did not contest Hackney Central at the 1929 general election, when he was elected as the MP for Gillingham in Kent. He held the seat until he retired from the Commons at the 1945 general election.

== Animal welfare activism ==
Gower's career was most noted for his service on behalf of animals. From 1929 until his retirement in 1945, he was chairman of the Animal Welfare Committee in Parliament. He introduced several measures and laws to protect animals, including the Protection of Animals (Cruelty to Dogs) Act of 1933, the Protection of Animals Act of 1934, the Cinematograph Films (Animals) Act of 1937, and the Dogs Act of 1938.

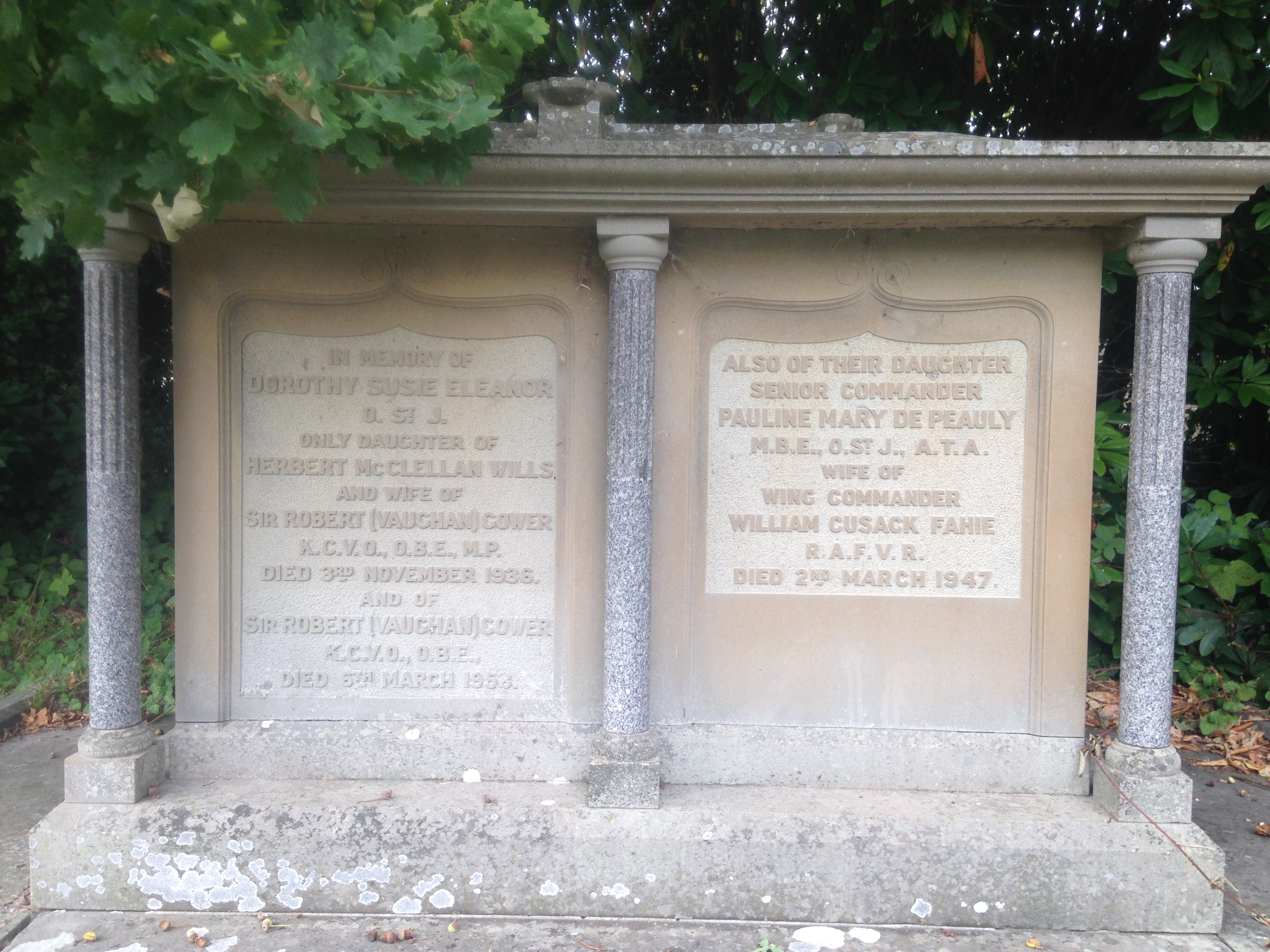
Gower family memorial Tunbridge Wells, Kent and Sussex Crematorium and Cemetery

Gower was chairman of the RSPCA for 23 years, and in 1951 was elected president of the organisation. He was also a founding member and president of the Pit Ponies Protection Society, and was chairman and honorary treasurer of the National Canine Defence League.

== Personal life ==
Robert Gower married Dorothy Susie Eleanor Wills (1882-1936). They had two daughters, Dorothy Vaughan Gower and Pauline Mary de Peauly Gower. The family lived at Sandown Court in Tunbridge Wells. Gower died on 6 March 1953 and was buried in the family tomb with his wife Dorothy and daughter Pauline who predeceased him.

Parliament of the United Kingdom
Preceded by Leonard Franklin	Member of Parliament for Hackney Central; 1924 – 1929	Succeeded by Fred Watkins
Preceded by Sir Gerald Hohler	Member of Parliament for Gillingham; 1929 – 1945	Succeeded by Joseph Binns
