= Horatio Davies =

Lord Mayor of London

Davies in 1895

Lieutenant Colonel Sir Horatio David Davies KCMG (1842 – 18 September 1912) was a London businessman, politician, magistrate and a driving force behind the establishment of Pimm's as an international brandname.

== Early life ==
Son of H. D. Davies Esq, he was educated as a "poor scholar" at Edward Alleyn's original "College of God's Gift in Dulwich", founded in 1619. The school was always known colloquially as "Dulwich College", and the original buildings where Davies was taught are now The Old College and Almshouses in Dulwich Village.

Alleyn's charitable foundation was renamed Alleyn's College of God's Gift in 1857 (when Davies was aged around 15), and was split into Upper and Lower schools. The Upper School moved into new premises in 1870 (formally becoming Dulwich College in 1882), with the Lower School remaining in the old buildings until 1887 when it moved into its new (and current) premises, becoming Alleyn's School. Horatio maintained that, as a small boy, he had seen the bones of the founder of Dulwich College, Edward Alleyn, when his tomb was moved.

After completing his education at Dulwich College he was apprenticed as an engraver for seven years, but relinquished the career because it did not seem to afford a wide enough field to his activity and ambition.

His later career was both of a political and business nature. He was said to have been in his enterprises loyal to his old friends but he disliked the intrusion of newcomers. He was for many year an officer of the 3rd Middlesex Artillery Volunteers, and retired with the rank of an honorary Lieutenant Colonel with the Volunteer Decoration.

== Business career ==
=== Restaurateur ===
In the early 1870s Horatio Davies took interests with his wife's brother, Frederick Gordon, in restaurants for businessmen. They started with the London Tavern and Pimm's Oyster Bar, the Holborn Restaurant and Crosby Hall, Bishopsgate, followed with much success. Crosby Hall, the old palace of Richard III dates from 1466. It is one of the City's oldest buildings and the only surviving medieval merchant house in the City of London. It was turned into a restaurant by Frederick Gordon & Co. in 1868. The previous tenants for seven years had been H. R. Williams, wine merchants, who stored imported wine in the crypt and vault. In 1871 the whole of the property was put up for auction by the Freeman family, descendants of William Freeman, a sugar merchant born on St. Kitts in 1656 who had bought the freehold in 1692. Although much of the estate was sold, including houses in Bishopsgate Street, Crosby Square and Great St. Helen's, the hall was bought in at £22,500, and sold privately to the current tenants Messrs. Gordon & Co. for about £37,000. It was elaborately restored to plans by the architects F. and H. Francis. (Note: F. and H. Francis designed Stephen's Church, East India Dock Road, Poplar (demolished 1950) Christ Church, Lancaster Gate (mostly demolished 1977) and 8, Kensington Palace Gardens which housed the London Cage during WW2 (demolished 1961).)

Following these ventures, Gordon went on to found the Gordon Hotels Group. Horatio was also noted as owning the Ship and Turtle in Leadenhall Street. He later sold Crosby Hall - one of the City's most ancient buildings, which had previously been saved a number of times from destruction, in April 1907 to the Chartered Bank of India, Australia, and China to make way for a new bank building. Its impending demolition aroused a huge protest from individuals and the papers. The building was finally dismantled in 1910 and rebuilt in Cheyne Walk, Chelsea.

=== Pimm's ===
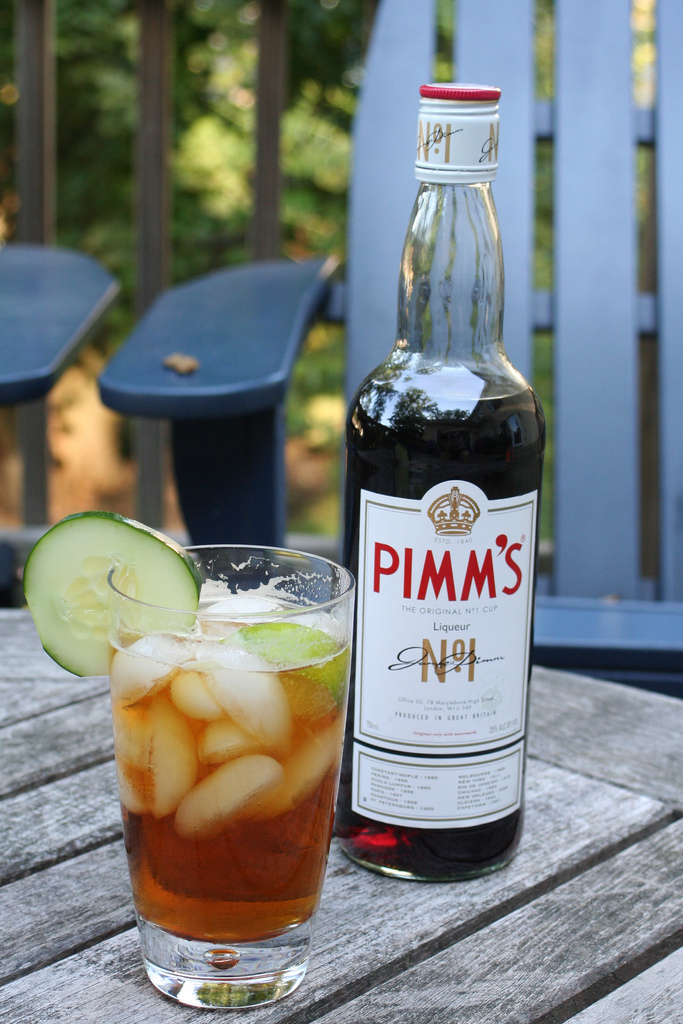
Pimm's Cup

James Pimm, a shellfishmonger with premises in Poultry, London had invented the Pimms beverage as an aid to digesting the oysters his business was selling. In 1880, Davies purchased the business from Frederick Sawyer who had owned it since 1865, and a chain of Pimm's Oyster Houses was franchised in 1887. The brand was expanded as Davies started the process of bottling the "Number One Cup" for other establishments to sell. He also expanded the chain to five Pimm's restaurants. Gradually, an export business was built up, so that by the time of Sir Horatio's death in 1912, Pimm's cocktail was known internationally, especially in the British Empire.

== Political career ==
Horatio was actively involved in the law, and in local and national politics. He was an Alderman in London. His first connection with the Court of Common Council was his election as representative of the Ward of Cheap in 1885. Four years later he became a member of the Court of Aldermen for Bishopsgate, and was soon chosen to serve as Sheriff of London and Middlesexin 1887. His name appears as an Alderman on a plaque commemorating the opening of Tower Bridge in 1894.

He was Master of the Worshipful Company of Loriners, Master of the Worshipful Company of Spectacle Makers in 1897, the same year as he served as Lord Mayor of London. His old school in the form of the Dulwich College Rifle Volunteer Corps (a forerunner of the present day CCF), took part in his Lord Mayor's Show in 1897. He was said to have entertained more lavishly than any other occupant of the Mansion House.

1897 was also the year of Queen Victoria Golden Jubilee, and he welcomed the Queen to the City of London as part of the celebrations. He was knighted at the close of his mayoralty as a KCMG.

His first attempt to enter Parliament was for Rochester as a Tory in 1889, but Edward Knatchbull-Hugessen defeated him. The Rochester by-election was caused by the resignation of the Conservative Francis Hughes-Hallett after a scandal.

=== 1892 general election ===
Standing again for Rochester he topped the poll and was returned as an MP in the July 1892 general election, only to be unseated after an electoral petition in December that year. The election was declared void, and a by-election was held in 1893, with Viscount Cranborne being returned unopposed.

The election petition had been brought on Election fraud bribery charges, including treating of electors and irregular election expenses. Maidstone, just down the road, had been plagued by "electoral squalor" for centuries, like eg Yarmouth, Bodmin and Worcester.

The judges were Sir Lewis Cave and Roland Vaughan Williams, the uncle of the composer Ralph Vaughan Williams.

According to the judgement:

Payments by Davies to his Conservative constituency association were supposed to cover registration expenses, but no accounts were produced to prove it. The association held a conversazione with food and drink provided at nominal price to the attendees; the costs were not returned as election expenses.

Coming to the alleged treating at the conversaziones his lordship said that those who had the management, of it went considerably beyond what Alderman Davies intended, and what was advertised. It was obvious the refreshments could not be supplied for the sum charged, and this amounted to corrupt treating. He was unable to come to the conclusion, however, that Alderman Davies knew of it at the time or assented to it. The Constitutional Association, which organised the conversazione, however, were agents of Alderman Davies, and he must bear the responsibility of their illegal acts.

His lordship spoke in terms of deprecation of the smoking concerts and the 'Birth Night Club' festivities in connection with politics, and went on to say that in this case the object was to influence voters. The financial affairs of the Constitutional Association were conducted in a very lax way, which was calculated to give rise to suspicion, for there was a considerable sum unaccounted for. He acquitted Alderman Davies of any corrupt intent.

He held on to his seat for Chatham from 1895 to 1906 as a member of the Conservative Party. He was returned unopposed in the 1900 general election, but lost in the 1906 election to John Jenkins, one of 29 MPs of the Labour Representation Committee, the predecessor of the Labour Party.

== Later life and death ==
In 1898 he was also a magistrate for Kent and one of Her Majesty's Lieutenants for London. As a magistrate he was regarded as just, but severe to wrong-doers, while tender-hearted for cases of distress. He was made an Officer of the Legion of Honour. He was knighted as a Knight Commander of the Order of St Michael and St George (KCMG) in 1898.

He was much travelled, and had recently returned from a trip to South Africa before his death at Watcombe Hall, Torquay, Devon on 18 September 1912. Watcombe Hall is a large stuccoed villa on the south-east side of Watcombe Park, created by I. K. Brunel out of farmland purchased between 1847 and 1858. The estate, comprising 500 acres (208 ha), was sold in 1876 to a Nottingham banker and MP, Colonel Charles Ichabod Wright. (Note: Wright, who lived at Stapleford Park, Leicestershire, may have known Davies who bought the Colwick Hall estate, Nottinghamshire, around 25 miles away and had other business interests in the area.)

== Personal life ==
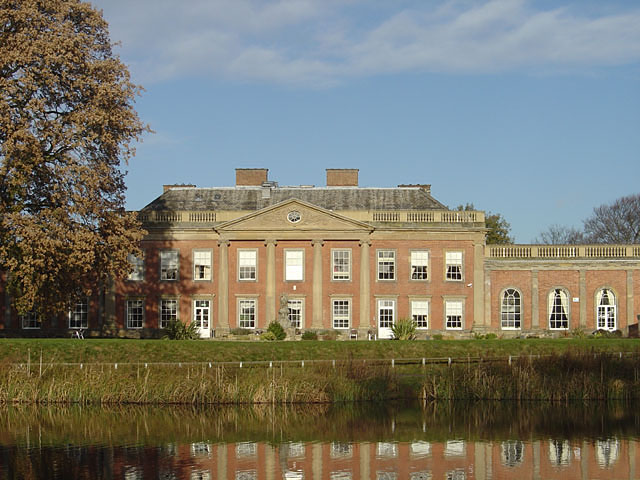
Colwick Hall, which Davies owned for a short while

In 1867 he married Lizzie, the sister of his business partner Frederick Gordon (and the daughter of Charles John Gordon). After her death in 1907 he married Pauline Marie Boniface in 1909.

He bought the estate of Colwick Hall, Nottinghamshire in 1888, ending the Musters family's 238 years of ownership. Davies held Colwick Hall and the lower part of the Park area for a short time only before selling it to a leisure and sporting syndicate which laid out a course for horse racing, opening it to the public in 1892. The hall and racecourse were later purchased by Nottingham City Council, and the hall became a public house.

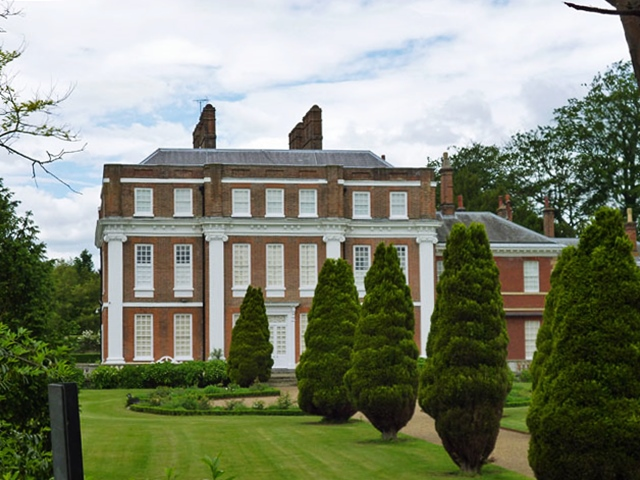
Wateringbury Place which Davies bought in 1890

He bought Wateringbury Place, near Maidstone, Kent in 1890 for £20,000. He was an art lover and a discriminating purchaser of pictures, and filled the house with famous works of art. One of these was Glaucus and Scylla, one of a pair of tondos by Turner, purchased after 1883 for about £570. He sold it in 1901. He also owned a large collection of antique silverware including porringers of the time of "William the Dutchman," antique goblets, vinaigrettes, and the like "in almost endless profusion". He also owned a solid gold bowl once the property of King Thibaw Min, and an extensive assortment of rings, Oriental fetishes and other graven golden images and knick knacks.

Davies was an Officer of the Légion d'honneur and a leading Freemason. He was a member of both the Carlton Club and the Junior Carlton Club.

Parliament of the United Kingdom
Preceded by Edward Knatchbull-Hugessen	Member of Parliament for Rochester; 1892–1893	Succeeded by The Viscount Cranborne
Preceded by Lewis Vivian Loyd	Member of Parliament for Chatham; 1895–1906	Succeeded by John Hagan Jenkins
Civic offices
Preceded by Sir George Faudel-Phillips, Bt	Lord Mayor of London; 1897–1898	Succeeded by Sir John Voce Moore
