= Maurice Spencer =

Colonel Maurice Spencer CMG (1863–1940) was a British Army military intelligence officer and political activist.

Born in London, Spencer received a degree from Birkbeck College. He then decided to join the British Army, and attended the Graduate Ordnance College, at which he qualified as an interpreter in French. From 1900 to 1902, he served in Hong Kong, then served in a wide variety of locations.

In 1914, Spencer was appointed as Chief Censor in Malta then, the following year, he was appointed by the MI5 as supervisor of a new local intelligence organisation, which later became the Malta Special Intelligence Bureau. From 1916, he was also the Deputy Director of Ordnance Services in Thessaloniki.

Spencer was a supporter of the Labour Party, for which he stood in Gillingham at the 1922 United Kingdom general election. He took second place, with 41.9% of the vote, and although he stood again in 1923 and 1924, his share of the vote fell back. He was concerned that there was no Labour organisation in the neighbouring Canterbury constituency, and in 1928 he was elected as the first president of a new Constituency Labour Party in the seat. At the 1929 United Kingdom general election, Spencer stood in Bournemouth, taking last place with only 15.9% of the vote.

Spencer held membership of the 1917 Club and the Fabian Society. He wrote for Sylvia Pankhurst's New Times and Ethiopia News in opposition to Italian fascism. He was made a Companion of the Order of St Michael and St George.
