= Frederick Burden =

British politician

Sir Frederick Burden

Member of Parliament for Gillingham
- In office 23 February 1950 – 13 May 1983
- Preceded by: Joseph Binns
- Succeeded by: James Couchman

Personal details
- Born: 27 December 1905 Easthampstead, Berkshire, England
- Died: 6 July 1987 (aged 81) Weymouth, Dorset, England
- Party: National Labour; Conservative

Sir Frederick Frank Arthur Burden (27 December 1905 – 6 July 1987) was a British Conservative politician and vice-chairman of the RSPCA.

== Career ==
Burden was educated at the Sloane School, Chelsea and was British schools boxing champion 1921–22. He served with the Royal Air Force in World War II, first with a Polish unit then with Eastern Air Command, and later on the staff of Lord Louis Mountbatten at South East Asia Command, attaining the rank of Squadron Leader.

He became a company director, including of British Eagle International Airlines.

== Politics ==
Burden contested South Shields as a National Labour candidate in 1935, and as a Conservative stood in Finsbury in 1945 and Rotherhithe in a 1946 by-election.

He was Member of Parliament (MP) for Gillingham from 1950 to 1983. By the time of his retirement at the age of 77, he was one of the oldest sitting MPs, as well as one of the longest serving, with 33 years to his credit. James Couchman was his successor.

== Animal welfare ==
Burden was chairman of the Parliamentary Animal Welfare Group. In the early 1960s, he planned to create a Private Member’s Bill extending legal protection to the badger. His Bill proposed to outlaw badger hunting but also legalise the licensed control of "rogue" animals. The Bill did not reach the stage of formal Parliamentary debate.

In 1969, Burden was the vice-chairman of the RSPCA and had been president of the Kent Wildfowlers Association for 15 years. There was a campaign for Burden to resign from the RSPCA due to his support of field sports which members claimed was hypocritical considering his position in the RSPCA. In response, Burden stated that he did not believe there was an issue with him belonging to both organisations and defended the Kent Wildfowlers Association. He commented that "I have shot pheasants, and I see nothing wrong with that. And of course, I fish". The RSPCA chairman John Hobhouse responded that "we certainly object to the shooting of birds for pleasure, I would prefer if he wasn't involved".

== Honours ==
Burden was appointed a knight bachelor in the 1980 Birthday Honours for political and public service.

Parliament of the United Kingdom
Preceded by Joseph Binns	Member of Parliament for Gillingham; 1950–1983	Succeeded by James Couchman
