= Naushabah Khan =

British politician

Naushabah Khan MP
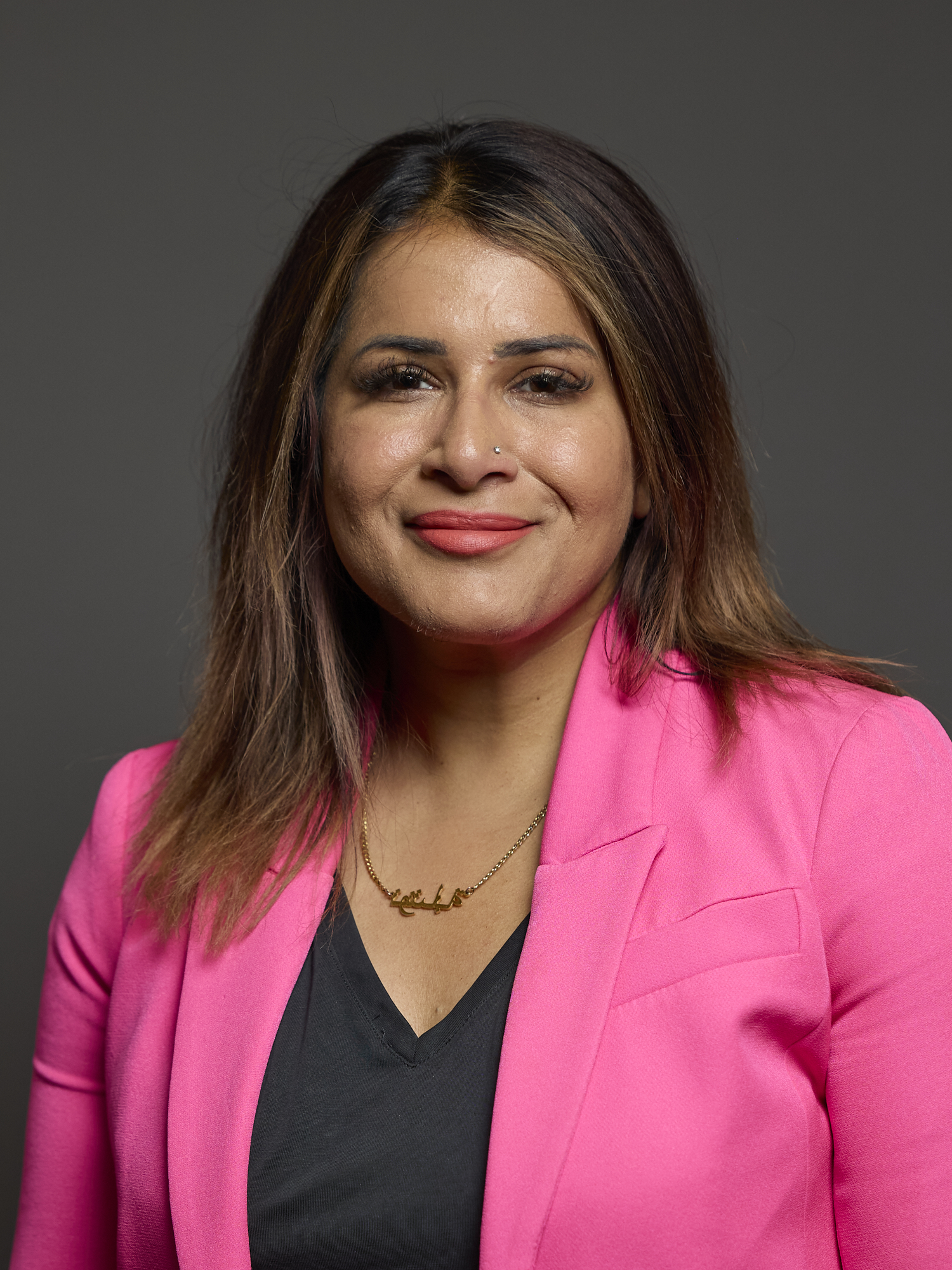
- Official portrait, 2024

Member of Parliament for Gillingham and Rainham
- Incumbent
- Assumed office 4 July 2024
- Preceded by: Rehman Chishti
- Majority: 3,972 (9.6%)

Member of Medway Council for Gillingham South
- In office 7 May 2015 – 16 December 2024
- Preceded by: David Colman
- Succeeded by: Liubov Nestorova

Personal details
- Born: Naushabah Parveen Khan; 26 February 1986 (age 40) Chatham, Kent, England
- Party: Labour
- Education: University of Birmingham (BA); BPP University (GDL)
- Website: naushabahkhan.com

Naushabah Parveen Khan (/nəˈʃɑːbə ˈkɑːn/ nə-SHAH-bə KAHN) is a British Labour Party politician who has been the Member of Parliament (MP) for Gillingham and Rainham since 2024.

== Early life ==
Khan was born at the former All Saints' Hospital in Chatham and grew up in Gillingham. She attended Fort Pitt Grammar School and Sir Joseph Williamson's Mathematical School. She graduated with a Bachelor of Arts (BA) degree in history from the University of Birmingham in 2007. She went on to complete a graduate diploma in law at BPP Law School in 2013. She worked as a PR consultant.

== Political career ==
Khan stood as the Labour candidate in Rochester and Strood during the 2014 by-election and the 2015 general election, but only finished third on both occasions, with 16.8% and 19.8% of the vote respectively. In 2024, she was elected as the MP for Gillingham and Rainham, defeating incumbent Conservative MP Rehman Chishti by 15,562 votes to 11,590, a majority of 9.6%.

In September 2025, Khan was appointed as the Parliamentary Private Secretary to the Cabinet Office. She resigned from the role on 11 May 2026 following Labour's defeat in local elections.

== Personal life ==
Khan is a keen kickboxer.

Parliament of the United Kingdom
| Preceded by Rehman Chishti | Member of Parliament for Gillingham and Rainham; 2024–present | Incumbent |
