= Joseph Binns =

British politician

Joseph Binns CBE

Member of Parliament for Gillingham
- In office 5 July 1945 – 3 February 1950
- Preceded by: Robert Gower
- Succeeded by: Frederick Burden

Personal details
- Born: 19 March 1900
- Died: 23 April 1975 (aged 75)
- Party: Labour
- Spouse: Daisy Graham (m. 1924)
- Children: 2

Joseph Binns, CBE (19 March 1900 – 23 April 1975) was a British Labour Party politician.

Binns was the son of Alderman Joseph Binns, who later became Lord Mayor of Manchester. He was educated at elementary schools and at Manchester College of Technology, and became a consulting engineer, working for ICI.

He was a member of Greenwich Borough Council from 1932 to 1949, and was Chairman of the Joint Standing Committee of the Metropolitan Boroughs from 1945 to 1949. At the 1945 general election he was elected as the Member of Parliament (MP) for Gillingham in Kent. He was Parliamentary Private Secretary to the Minister of Supply, John Wilmot, from 1946 to 1947. He was defeated at the 1950 general election, after catching influenza during the campaign, and was never returned to the House of Commons.

Binns was appointed as a Commissioner of the Public Works Loan Board in 1948, a role held until 1972, becoming deputy chairman of the board in 1958 and chairman in 1970. He was made a Commander of the Order of the British Empire (CBE) in the New Year Honours 1961.

== Family ==
Binns married Daisy Graham in 1924, and they had two sons: Graham and Joseph Christopher. Graham Binns (1925–2003) was a broadcaster and arts campaigner who served for five years as chairman of the British Committee for the Restitution of the Parthenon Marbles. Another son, Joseph Binns (born 1931), was a Labour Party councillor in Greenwich who stood unsuccessfully for Parliament on three occasions: as a Labour candidate in Bromley at the 1964 general election and in his father's old constituency of Gillingham in 1966, and as a Social Democratic Party (SDP) candidate in Birmingham Edgbaston at the 1983 general election.

Parliament of the United Kingdom
Preceded by Sir Robert Gower	Member of Parliament for Gillingham; 1945 – 1950	Succeeded by Frederick Burden
