= Thomas Hohler =

British diplomat (1871–1946)

Sir Thomas Hohler KCMG CB JP
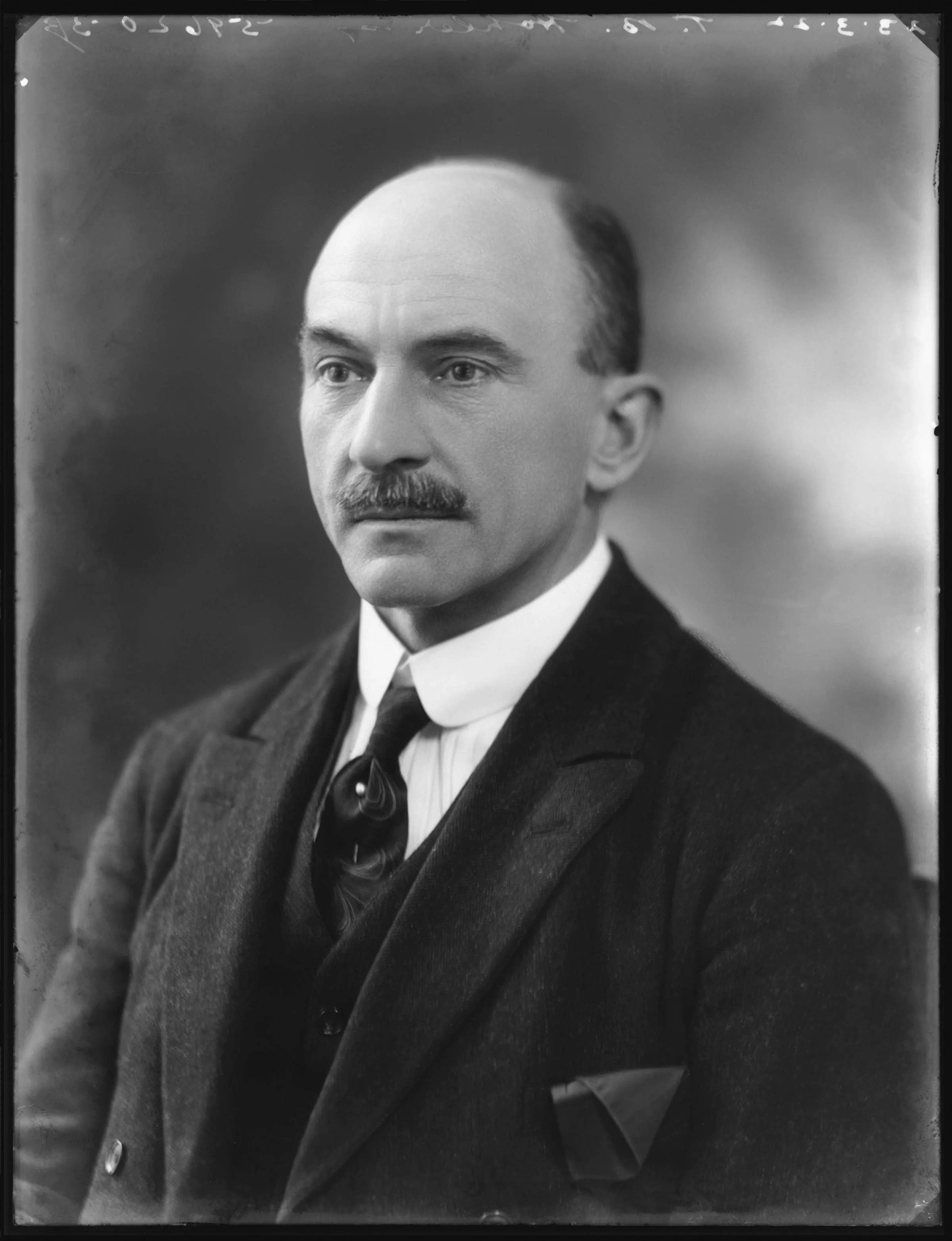
- Hohler in 1922
- Born: Thomas Beaumont Hohler; March 15, 1871; London, England
- Died: April 23, 1946 (aged 75); Kent, England
- Education: Eton College; Trinity College, Cambridge
- Spouse: Cynthia Elizabeth Violet Astell (m. 1922)
- Children: 2
- Relatives: Gerald Hohler (brother)

Sir Thomas Beaumont Hohler KCMG CB JP (15 March 1871 – 23 April 1946) was a 20th-century British diplomat.

== Background and education ==
Born in London, the sixth and youngest son of Henry Booth Hohler (1835–1916), High Sheriff of Kent (for 1901/02) by his wife Henrietta Wilhelmina Lawes, his elder brother was politician and barrister Sir Gerald Hohler KC MP.

Hohler was educated at Eton and Trinity College, Cambridge, before entering HM Diplomatic Service in 1894.

== Career ==
Appointed Second Secretary in 1901, then First Secretary in 1908 to Constantinople, Hohler was posted to Mexico in 1910 and promoted Counsellor (1915) then Minister Plenipotentiary (1918).

Serving at Mexico City during World War I, he was involved in the interception of the German Zimmermann Telegram used to promote the United States entry into the war. Although acting anonymously at the time, he later identified himself as the mysterious "Mr. H" responsible for intercepting the inflammatory telegram.

In 1920, Hohler was appointed High Commissioner to Budapest, Hungary, where he made a bold effort to convince the British Government to revise the terms of the Trianon Treaty to better favor Hungary.

Then head of HBM Commercial Legation to Bogotá, Colombia, Sir Thomas served in Chile (1924–28) before becoming British Minister to Denmark (1928–1933).

In 1942 his Diplomatic Petrel was published.

Appointed in 1934 a Justice of the Peace for Kent, Sir Thomas was seated at Fawkham Manor where he died in 1946, aged 75.

== Family ==
Hohler in 1922 married Cynthia Elizabeth Violet Astell (1893–1966), younger daughter of William Harvey Astell and the Hon. Elizabeth Maria Vereker, a descendant of the Schuyler, Van Cortlandt and Delancey families from colonial British North America.

Sir Thomas and Lady Hohler had two children:

- Gerald Arthur Hohler (1923–2014), married Margaret Stucley, eldest daughter of Sir Dennis Stucley, having two daughters and a son: Thomas Edward Hohler (married Georgina Stourton).
- Anne Elizabeth Hohler (1935–1981), married David Kingston.

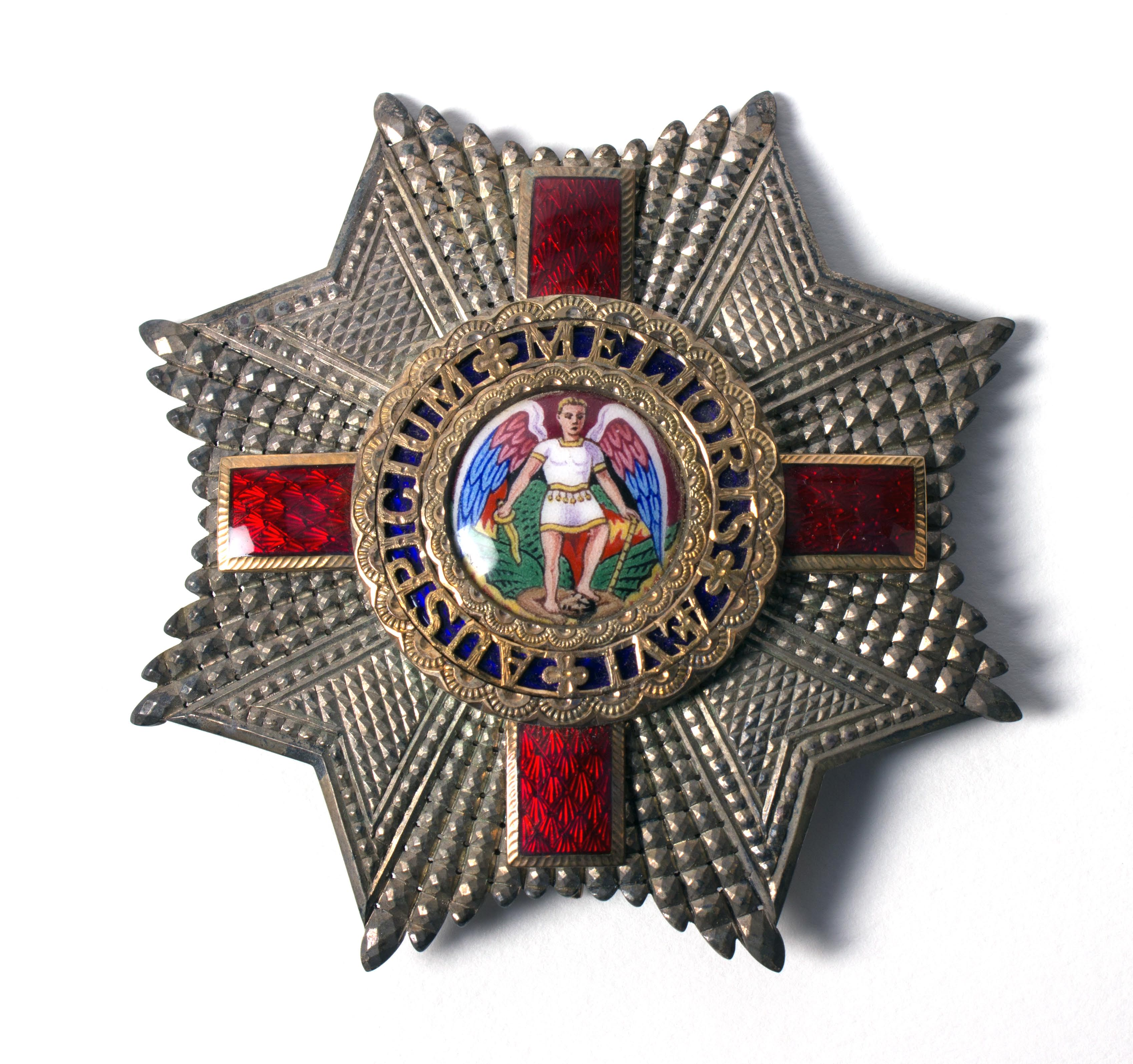
KCMG breast star

== Honours ==
- KCMG (1924)
- CB (1916 Birthday Honours)
- Order of the Dannebrog (Denmark)
- Order of Merit (Chile)

== Sources ==
- A Case Study on Trianon
- Burke's Landed Gentry

Diplomatic posts
Preceded by Sir Milne Cheetham	British Envoy Extraordinary and Minister Plenipotentiary to Denmark; 1928 – 1933	Succeeded by Sir Hugh Gurney
