= Frederick Smith (British Army officer, born 1790) =

British Army general (1790–1874)

Major-General Sir Frederick Smith KH FRS
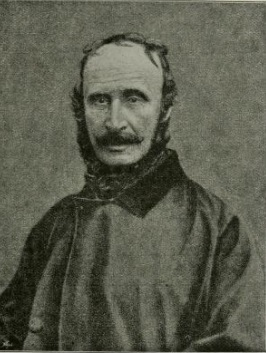

Member of Parliament for Chatham
- In office 1857–1865
- Preceded by: Leicester Viney Vernon
- Succeeded by: Arthur Otway
- In office 1852–1853
- Preceded by: George Byng
- Succeeded by: Leicester Viney Vernon

Personal details
- Born: John Mark Frederick Smith; 11 January 1790 London, United Kingdom
- Died: 20 November 1874 (aged 84) London, United Kingdom
- Resting place: Kensal Green cemetery
- Education: Royal Military College, Sandhurst; Royal Military Academy, Woolwich

Military service
- Allegiance: United Kingdom
- Branch/service: British Army
- Rank: Major-General
- Commands: Royal Engineers
- Battles/wars: Napoleonic Wars

Major-General Sir John Mark Frederick Smith KH FRS (11 January 1790 – 20 November 1874) was a British general and colonel-commandant of the Royal Engineers. He was also the Conservative Member of Parliament for Chatham from 1852 to 1853 and 1857 to 1865. He was a Gentleman Usher and Fellow of the Royal Society.

== Life ==
He was son of Major-general Sir John Frederick Sigismund Smith, K.C.H., of the Royal Artillery (died 1834), and grand-nephew of Field-marshal Friedrich Adolf, Count von Kalckreuth, commander-in-chief of the Prussian army. He was born at the Manor House, Paddington, Middlesex, on 11 January 1790. After passing through the Royal Military College, then at Great Marlow, and the Royal Military Academy, Woolwich, Smith received a commission as second lieutenant in the Royal Engineers on 1 December 1805, and in January 1806 joined his corps at Chatham.

In 1807 Smith went to Sicily. He served in 1809 under Major-general Sir Alexander Bryce, the commanding Royal Engineer of the force of Sir John Stuart, at the siege and capture of the castle of Ischia and at the capture of Procida in the Bay of Naples. He also took part, in the same year, in the capture of the islands of Zante and Kephalonia under Major-General Frederick Rennell Thackeray, commanding Royal Engineer of the force of Sir John Oswald. Smith was deputy-assistant quartermaster-general and senior officer of the quartermaster-general's department under Sir Hudson Lowe in 1810, in the battle before Santa Maura. He resigned his staff appointment in order to serve as an engineer officer in the trenches during the siege of Santa Maura under Oswald, the only engineer officer in addition to Thackeray and himself, Captain Parker having been wounded. The deficiency of engineer officers threw on Smith most of the executive work of the siege. He was mentioned in Sir John Oswald's despatches, and some years afterwards an effort was unsuccessfully made to get him a brevet majority for his services at Santa Maura.

Smith was promoted to be second captain on 1 May 1811. He served in Albania and in Sicily, and in 1812 returned to England to take up the appointment of adjutant to the corps of the Royal Sappers and Miners at their headquarters at Woolwich on 1 December. He held this appointment until 26 February 1815. He was promoted to be first captain on 26 August 1817, and in 1819, on the reduction of the corps of Royal Engineers, was placed on half-pay for seven months.

During the next ten years Smith was employed on various military duties in England. He was promoted to be regimental lieutenant-colonel on 16 March 1830, and was appointed commanding royal engineer of the London district. In 1831 he was made a knight of the Royal Hanoverian Guelphic Order by William IV, a Knight Bachelor on 13 September of the same year, an extra gentleman usher of the privy chamber in 1833, and on 17 March 1834 one of the ordinary gentlemen ushers. The last post he held until his death. On 2 December 1840 he was also appointed inspector-general of railways, in which capacity he examined and reported on the London and Birmingham Railway and the other principal railways before they were opened to the public. In 1841 Smith, in conjunction with Professor Peter Barlow, made a report to the treasury respecting railway communication between London, Edinburgh, and Glasgow. Smith resigned the appointment of inspector-general of railways at the end of 1841, and became director of the Royal Engineer establishment at Chatham on 1 January 1842.

On 5 July 1845 Smith and Professors George Airy and Barlow were constituted a commission to inquire whether future parliamentary railway bills should provide for a uniform rail gauge, and whether it would be expedient or practicable to bring railways already constructed or in course of construction into uniformity of gauge. On 30 March 1846 he was appointed one of the five commissioners to investigate and report upon the various railway projects in which it was proposed to have a terminus in the metropolis or its vicinity. On 9 November 1846 Smith was promoted to be colonel in the army, and on 1 May 1851 he was moved from Chatham to be commanding Royal Engineer of the southern district, with his headquarters at Portsmouth.

In July 1852 Smith was returned to parliament as member for Chatham in the Conservative interest, but in March 1853 he was unseated on petition. He was promoted to be major-general on 20 January 1854. In 1855 he was transferred from Portsmouth to the command of the Royal Engineers at Aldershot. He was appointed public examiner and inspector of the East India Company's Military Seminary at Addiscombe in 1856. In March 1857 he was again returned to parliament as member for Chatham. He resigned his command at Aldershot, finding his time fully occupied with parliamentary and other duties. He was a member of the royal commission on harbours of refuge in 1858, and of the commission on promotion and retirement in the army. He was again returned as member for Chatham at the election of April 1859, and continued to sit for that borough until 1868. He was promoted to be lieutenant-general on 25 October 1859, colonel-commandant of Royal Engineers on 6 July 1860, and general on 3 August 1863.

Smith died on 20 November 1874 at his residence, 62 Pembridge Villas, Notting Hill Gate, London, and was buried in Kensal Green cemetery. He was a Fellow of the Royal Society, an associate of the Institution of Civil Engineers, and a member of many learned bodies.

== Works ==
Smith was the author of 'The Military Course of Engineering at Arras,’ Chatham, 1850, and he translated, with notes, Marshal Marmont's 'Present State of the Turkish Empire,’ London, 1839; 2nd ed. 1854.

== Family ==
Smith married at Buckland, near Dover, on 31 January 1813, Harriet, daughter of Thomas Thorn, of Buckland House. There was no issue.

Parliament of the United Kingdom
Preceded by George Byng	Member of Parliament for Chatham; 1852 – 1853	Succeeded by Leicester Viney Vernon
Preceded by Leicester Viney Vernon	Member of Parliament for Chatham; 1857 – 1865	Succeeded by Arthur Otway
