= James Couchman =

British politician (1942–2023)

Member of Parliament for Gillingham
- In office 9 June 1983 – 8 April 1997
- Preceded by: Frederick Burden
- Succeeded by: Paul Clark

Personal details
- Born: James Randall Couchman; 11 February 1942
- Died: 16 November 2023 (aged 81)
- Party: Conservative
- Education: Newcastle University

James Randall Couchman (11 February 1942 – 16 November 2023) was a British Conservative politician who served as a Member of Parliament from 1983 to 1997.

== Early life ==
James Randall Couchman was born on 11 February 1942. He is the son of Stanley Couchman, who was an English international rugby union player. He was educated at Cranleigh School and the University of Newcastle and was a London Borough of Bexley councillor from 1974 to 1982. He later served as a county councillor in Oxfordshire from 2005 until he retired in 2013.

== Political career ==
Couchman first stood for Parliament at Chester-le-Street in 1979, but was beaten by Labour's Giles Radice.

Couchman was Member of Parliament (MP) for Gillingham from 1983 until his defeat in 1997 by Labour's Paul Clark. He appeared in a documentary for Channel 4's Cutting Edge entitled Last Year's Tories, which looked at the lives of ten Conservative MPs who had been unseated at the 1997 election, which aired on the first anniversary of their defeat in 1998.

== Death ==
Couchman died on 16 November 2023, at the age of 81.

== Sources ==
- "Times Guide to the House of Commons", Times Newspapers Limited, 1997 edition.

Parliament of the United Kingdom
Preceded by Sir Frederick Burden	Member of Parliament for Gillingham; 1983–1997	Succeeded by Paul Clark
