= Gillingham (constituency) =

Parliamentary constituency in the United Kingdom, 1918–2010

Coordinates: 51°23′N 0°33′E

- Former borough constituency for the House of Commons
- Boundary of Gillingham in Kent for the 2005 general election

- Location of Kent within England
- County: Kent
- Major settlements: Gillingham and Rainham

1918–2010
- Created from: Rochester, Chatham and Faversham
- Replaced by: Gillingham and Rainham

Gillingham was a constituency represented in the House of Commons of the Parliament of the United Kingdom. It elected one Member of Parliament (MP) by the first past the post system of election.

== Boundaries ==
1918–1950: The Municipal Borough of Gillingham, part of the Municipal Borough of Rochester, and the Municipal Borough of Chatham ward of St Mary.

1950–1983: The Municipal Borough of Gillingham.

1983–1997: The Borough of Gillingham, and the Borough of Swale ward of Hartlip and Upchurch.

1997–2010: The Borough of Gillingham.

The constituency was based around the towns of Gillingham and Rainham, which at that time were in Kent.

=== Boundary review ===
Following their review of parliamentary representation in Kent, the Boundary Commission for England abolished Gillingham, replacing it with the renamed constituency of Gillingham and Rainham.

== Members of Parliament ==
Election	Member	Party
1918	Sir Gerald Hohler	Conservative
1929	Sir Robert Gower	Conservative
1945	Joseph Binns	Labour
1950	Sir Frederick Burden	Conservative
1983	James Couchman	Conservative
1997	Paul Clark	Labour
2010	Constituency abolished: see extended constituency of Gillingham and Rainham.	

== Election results ==
=== Elections in the 2000s ===
General election 2005: Gillingham
Party	Candidate	Votes	%	±%
Labour	Paul Clark	18,621	41.2	−3.3
Conservative	Tim Butcher	18,367	40.7	+1.6
Liberal Democrats	Andrew Stamp	6,734	14.9	+1.3
UKIP	Craig Mackinlay	1,191	2.6	+0.4
Independent	Gordon Bryan	254	0.6	New
Majority		254	0.5	−4.9
Turnout		45,167	62.5	+3.0
Labour hold		Swing	−2.4	

General election 2001: Gillingham
Party	Candidate	Votes	%	±%
Labour	Paul Clark	18,782	44.5	+4.7
Conservative	Tim Butcher	16,510	39.1	+3.2
Liberal Democrats	Jonathan Hunt	5,755	13.6	−5.4
UKIP	Tony Scholefield	933	2.2	+1.0
Socialist Alliance	Wynford Thomas	232	0.5	New
Majority		2,272	5.4	+2.5
Turnout		42,212	59.5	−12.5
Labour hold		Swing	+0.7	

=== Elections in the 1990s ===
General election 1997: Gillingham
Party	Candidate	Votes	%	±%
Labour	Paul Clark	20,187	39.8	
Conservative	James Couchman	18,207	35.9	
Liberal Democrats	Robert Sayer	9,649	19.0	
Referendum	Geoffrey Cann	1,492	2.9	New
UKIP	Craig Mackinlay	590	1.2	
Monster Raving Loony	David Robinson	305	0.6	New
BNP	Christopher Jury	195	0.4	New
Natural Law	Gabriel Duguay	58	0.1	
Majority		1,980	2.9	N/A
Turnout		50,683	72.0	−8.3
Labour gain from Conservative		Swing	+16.0	

General election 1992: Gillingham
Party	Candidate	Votes	%	±%
Conservative	James Couchman	30,201	52.3	−0.8
Labour	Paul Clark	13,563	23.5	+6.4
Liberal Democrats	Mark Wallabank	13,509	23.4	−6.5
Independent	Craig Mackinlay	248	0.4	New
Natural Law	Daniel Jolicoeur	190	0.3	New
Majority		16,638	28.8	+5.6
Turnout		57,711	80.3	+5.0
Conservative hold		Swing	-3.6	

=== Elections in the 1980s ===
General election 1987: Gillingham
Party	Candidate	Votes	%	±%
Conservative	James Couchman	28,711	53.1	+1.4
Liberal	Leighton Andrews	16,162	29.9	−0.6
Labour	David Bishop	9,230	17.0	−0.8
Majority		12,549	23.2	+2.0
Turnout		54,100	75.3	+1.7
Registered electors		71,847		
Conservative hold		Swing	+1.0	

General election 1983: Gillingham
Party	Candidate	Votes	%	±%
Conservative	James Couchman	26,381	51.7	−1.4
Alliance	Christopher Lewcock	15,538	30.5	+18.2
Labour	Antony West	9,084	17.8	−14.5
Majority		10,843	21.2	+0.4
Turnout		51,003	73.6	−5.2
Registered electors		69,256		
Conservative hold		Swing		

=== Elections in the 1970s ===
General election 1979: Gillingham
Party	Candidate	Votes	%	±%
Conservative	Frederick Burden	26,791	53.13	+12.74
Labour	Stephen Love	16,292	32.31	+0.39
Liberal	David Sidebottom	6,219	12.33	− 13.40
National Front	Sidney Campbell	528	1.05	−0.91
Ecology	Colin Fry	501	0.99	New
Workers Revolutionary	Terence Beckwith	92	0.18	New
Majority		10,499	20.82	+12.35
Turnout		50,425	78.85	+2.94
Registered electors		63,951		
Conservative hold		Swing	+6.18	

General election October 1974: Gillingham
Party	Candidate	Votes	%	±%
Conservative	Frederick Burden	19,042	40.39	−0.79
Labour	Henry Clother	15,046	31.92	+2.31
Liberal	Trevor Jones	12,131	25.73	−3.88
National Front	Sidney Campbell	922	1.96	New
Majority		3,996	8.47	−3.10
Turnout		47,139	75.91	−6.75
Registered electors		62,099		
Conservative hold		Swing	-1.55	

General election February 1974: Gillingham
Party	Candidate	Votes	%	±%
Conservative	Frederick Burden	20,934	41.18	−16.66
Liberal	Robert Sayer	15,052	29.61	New
Labour	Henry Clother	14,850	29.21	−11.95
Majority		5,882	11.57	−6.11
Turnout		50,834	82.66	+9.30
Registered electors		61,498		
Conservative hold		Swing	-23.14	

General election 1970: Gillingham
Party	Candidate	Votes	%	±%
Conservative	Frederick Burden	25,813	58.84	+9.34
Labour	Robert E. Bean	18,057	41.16	−0.63
Majority		7,756	17.68	+9.97
Turnout		43,870	73.36	−5.14
Registered electors		59,800		
Conservative hold		Swing	+4.99	

=== Elections in the 1960s ===
General election 1966: Gillingham
Party	Candidate	Votes	%	±%
Conservative	Frederick Burden	20,158	49.50	−1.85
Labour	Joseph Binns	17,018	41.79	+4.77
Liberal	Godfrey A Payne	3,546	8.71	−1.58
Majority		3,140	7.71	−6.62
Turnout		40,722	78.50	+0.45
Registered electors		51,874		
Conservative hold		Swing	-3.31	

General election 1964: Gillingham
Party	Candidate	Votes	%	±%
Conservative	Frederick Burden	20,228	51.35	−7.98
Labour	John Ryman	14,584	37.02	−3.65
Liberal	Godfrey A Payne	4,052	10.29	New
Independent	Frederick Cotter	527	1.34	New
Majority		5,644	14.33	−4.33
Turnout		39,391	78.05	−2.56
Registered electors		50,471		
Conservative hold		Swing	-2.17	

=== Elections in the 1950s ===
General election 1959: Gillingham
Party	Candidate	Votes	%	±%
Conservative	Frederick Burden	23,142	59.33	+3.85
Labour	Gerald Kaufman	15,863	40.67	−3.85
Majority		7,279	18.66	+7.70
Turnout		39,005	80.61	+1.08
Registered electors		48,390		
Conservative hold		Swing	+3.85	

General election 1955: Gillingham
Party	Candidate	Votes	%	±%
Conservative	Frederick Burden	20,984	55.48	+1.77
Labour	Joseph Huddart	16,839	44.52	−1.77
Majority		4,145	10.96	+3.54
Turnout		37,823	79.53	−5.94
Registered electors		47,561		
Conservative hold		Swing	+1.77	

General election 1951: Gillingham
Party	Candidate	Votes	%	±%
Conservative	Frederick Burden	21,453	53.71	+1.04
Labour	Edward Redhead	18,489	46.29	−1.04
Majority		2,964	7.42	+2.08
Turnout		39,942	85.47	+0.60
Registered electors		46,731		
Conservative hold		Swing	+1.04	

General election 1950: Gillingham
Party	Candidate	Votes	%	±%
Conservative	Frederick Burden	20,504	52.67	+5.94
Labour	Joseph Binns	18,424	47.33	−5.94
Majority		2,080	5.34	N/A
Turnout		38,928	84.87	+13.54
Registered electors		45,866		
Conservative gain from Labour		Swing	+5.94	

=== Elections in the 1940s ===
General election 1945: Gillingham
Party	Candidate	Votes	%	±%
Labour	Joseph Binns	15,110	53.27	+18.39
Conservative	Johnnie Dodge	13,254	46.73	−18.39
Majority		1,856	6.54	N/A
Turnout		28,364	71.33	−0.08
Registered electors		39,765		
Labour gain from Conservative		Swing	+18.39	

=== Elections in the 1930s ===
General election 1935: Gillingham
Party	Candidate	Votes	%	±%
Conservative	Robert Gower	18,726	65.12	−3.90
Labour	Evan Durbin	10,032	34.88	+3.90
Majority		8,694	30.24	−7.80
Turnout		28,758	71.41	−2.66
Registered electors		40,271		
Conservative hold		Swing	-3.90	

General election 1931: Gillingham
Party	Candidate	Votes	%	±%
Conservative	Robert Gower	20,277	69.02	+21.05
Labour	CM Wadham	9,103	30.98	−8.52
Majority		11,174	38.04	+29.57
Turnout		29,380	74.07	+0.05
Registered electors		39,664		
Conservative hold		Swing	+14.79	

=== Elections in the 1920s ===
General election 1929: Gillingham
Party	Candidate	Votes	%	±%
Unionist	Robert Gower	13,612	47.97	−4.72
Labour	George Pearce Blizard	11,207	39.50	+4.24
Liberal	R Ronald Tyrer	3,556	12.53	−4.90
Majority		2,405	8.47	−3.97
Turnout		28,375	74.02	−3.98
Registered electors		38,336		
Unionist hold		Swing	-4.48	

General election 1924: Gillingham
Party	Candidate	Votes	%	±%
Unionist	Gerald Hohler	12,418	52.69	+5.55
Labour	Maurice Spencer	8,309	35.26	+0.56
Liberal	George Herbert Bryans	2,839	17.43	+5.38
Majority		4,109	12.44	−3.84
Turnout		23,566	78.00	+4.08
Registered electors		30,212		
Unionist hold		Swing	+2.50	

General election 1923: Gillingham
Party	Candidate	Votes	%	±%
Unionist	Gerald Hohler	10,426	47.14	−11.00
Labour	Maurice Spencer	7,674	34.70	−7.16
Liberal	George Herbert Bryans	4,015	18.16	New
Majority		2,752	12.44	−3.84
Turnout		22,115	73.92	+1.63
Registered electors		29,919		
Unionist hold		Swing	-1.92	

General election 1922: Gillingham
Party	Candidate	Votes	%	±%
Unionist	Gerald Hohler	12,425	58.14	−10.44
Labour	Maurice Spencer	8,944	41.86	+15.95
Majority		3,481	16.28	−26.39
Turnout		21,369	72.29	+7.19
Registered electors		29,560		
Unionist hold		Swing	-13.20	

=== Elections in the 1910s ===
General election 1918: Gillingham
Party		Candidate	Votes	%	±%
C	Unionist	Gerald Hohler	12,455	68.58	
	Labour	Alfred William Tapp	4,705	25.91	
	Independent	Joseph Bryan Cronin*	1,001	5.51	
Majority			7,750	42.67	
Turnout			18,161	65.10	
Registered electors			27,899		
	Unionist win (new seat)				
C indicates candidate endorsed by the coalition government.

* Cronin was supported by the Lower Deck Parliamentary Committee

== See also ==
- List of parliamentary constituencies in Kent
