= Alfred John Callaghan =

Irish-British barrister and Liberal Party politician

Sir Alfred John Callaghan (29 October 1865 – 31 May 1940) was an Irish/British barrister and Liberal Party politician.

== Background ==
Callaghan was born the son of James Walker Callaghan, of Northumberland Road, Dublin. He obtained a Doctor of Law, from Trinity College Dublin. In 1914 he married Irene Knighton Warren of St John's Wood, London. He was knighted in 1915.

== Professional career ==
Callaghan was member of the Irish Bar and of the Inner Temple, London.

== Political career ==
Callaghan was Liberal candidate for the Unionist Eastbourne division of Sussex at the 1918 General Election. His Unionist opponent received endorsement from the Coalition Government and Callaghan finished third. He was Liberal candidate for the Chatham division of Kent at the 1922 General Election. This was another Unionist seat, but this time he finished second as there was no Labour candidate. In 1923 he again contested Chatham, and although a Labour candidate intervened, he again finished second. He did not stand for parliament again.

=== Electoral record ===
General Election 1918 Eastbourne
Party	Candidate	Votes	%	±%
Unionist	Rupert Gwynne	11,357	63.6	
Labour	Thomas Burleigh Hasdell	4,641	26.0	
Liberal	Alfred John Callaghan	1,852	10.4	
Majority		6,716	37.6	
Turnout			59.8	
Unionist hold		Swing		

General Election 1922: Chatham
Party	Candidate	Votes	%	±%
Unionist	John Moore-Brabazon	11,335		
Liberal	Alfred John Callaghan	10,682		
Majority				
Turnout				
Unionist hold		Swing	+2.1	

General Election 1923: Chatham
Party	Candidate	Votes	%	±%
Unionist	John Moore-Brabazon	9,994	41.6	−9.9
Liberal	Alfred John Callaghan	8,227	34.3	−14.2
Labour	Mary Hamilton	5,794	24.1	n/a
Majority		1,767	7.3	+4.3
Turnout			74.6	
Unionist hold		Swing	+2.1	
