= Chatham (constituency) =

Former UK Parliament constituency

Coordinates: 51°22′N 0°32′E

- Former borough constituency for the House of Commons
- County: Kent
- Major settlements: Chatham

1832–1950
- Seats: One
- Created from: Kent
- Replaced by: Rochester & Chatham

Chatham was a parliamentary constituency in Kent which returned one Member of Parliament (MP) to the House of Commons of the Parliament of the United Kingdom. It was created for the 1832 general election, when the borough of Chatham was enfranchised under the Reform Act 1832.

It was abolished for the 1950 general election, when it was largely replaced by the new Rochester and Chatham constituency. This then became Medway in 1983. When the boroughs of Rochester upon Medway and Gillingham merged to form the larger unitary Borough of Medway in 1998, the Parliamentary constituency of Medway only covered part of the new borough, so for the 2010 election it was renamed Rochester and Strood.

== Boundaries ==
1918–1950: The Borough of Rochester except part of St Peter's ward, and the Borough of Chatham wards of Luton and St John.

== Members of Parliament ==
Election	Member	Party
1832	William Leader Maberly	Whig
1834 by-election	George Byng	Whig
1835	Sir John Beresford, Bt.	Conservative
1837	George Byng	Whig
1852	Sir Frederick Smith	Conservative
1853 by-election	Leicester Viney Vernon	Conservative
1857	Sir Frederick Smith	Conservative
1865	Arthur Otway	Liberal
1874	George Elliot	Conservative
1875 by-election	Sir John Eldon Gorst	Conservative
1892	Lewis Vivian Loyd	Conservative
1895	Sir Horatio Davies	Conservative
1906	John Jenkins	Labour
1910	Gerald Hohler	Conservative
1918	John Moore-Brabazon	Conservative
1929	Frank Markham	Labour
1931	Frank Markham	National Labour
1931	Sir Park Goff	Conservative
1935	Leonard Plugge	Conservative
1945	Arthur Bottomley	Labour
1950	constituency abolished: see Rochester and Chatham	

== Elections ==
=== Elections in the 1830s ===
General election 1832: Chatham
Party	Candidate	Votes	%	±%
Whig	William Leader Maberly	363	59.4	
Radical	Thomas Erskine Perry	248	40.6	
Majority		115	18.8	
Turnout		611	90.3	
Registered electors		677		
Whig win (new seat)				

Maberly resigned on appointment as a Commissioner of Customs, causing a by-election.

By-election, 26 June 1834: Chatham
Party	Candidate	Votes	%	±%
Whig	George Byng	262	57.7	−1.7
Tory	William Ching	192	42.3	New
Majority		70	15.4	−3.4
Turnout		454	67.2	−23.1
Registered electors		676		
Whig hold		Swing		

General election 1835: Chatham
Party	Candidate	Votes	%	±%
Conservative	John Beresford	323	52.0	N/A
Whig	George Byng	298	48.0	−11.4
Majority		25	4.0	N/A
Turnout		621	92.4	+2.1
Registered electors		672		
Conservative gain from Whig		Swing		

General election 1837: Chatham
Party	Candidate	Votes	%	±%
Whig	George Byng	Unopposed		
Registered electors		785		
Whig gain from Conservative				

=== Elections in the 1840s ===
General election 1841: Chatham
Party	Candidate	Votes	%	±%
Whig	George Byng	457	66.1	N/A
Conservative	Price Blackwood	234	33.9	New
Majority		223	32.2	N/A
Turnout		691	80.2	N/A
Registered electors		862		
Whig hold		Swing	N/A	

General election 1847: Chatham
Party	Candidate	Votes	%	±%
Whig	George Byng	Unopposed		
Registered electors		1,145		
Whig hold				

=== Elections in the 1850s ===
General election 1852: Chatham
Party	Candidate	Votes	%	±%
Conservative	Frederick Smith	636	56.9	New
Whig	James Stirling	482	43.1	N/A
Majority		154	13.8	N/A
Turnout		1,118	81.5	N/A
Registered electors		1,371		
Conservative gain from Whig		Swing		

The election was declared void on petition, due to bribery, causing a by-election.

By-election, 23 June 1853: Chatham
Party	Candidate	Votes	%	±%
Conservative	Leicester Viney Vernon	610	50.5	−6.4
Whig	James Stirling	598	49.5	+6.4
Majority		12	1.0	−12.8
Turnout		1,208	90.2	+8.7
Registered electors		1,339		
Conservative hold		Swing	−6.4	

General election 1857: Chatham
Party	Candidate	Votes	%	±%
Conservative	Frederick Smith	672	51.1	−5.8
Whig	William Govett Romaine	643	48.9	+5.8
Majority		29	2.2	−11.6
Turnout		1,315	89.9	+8.4
Registered electors		1,463		
Conservative hold		Swing	−5.8	

General election 1859: Chatham
Party	Candidate	Votes	%	±%
Conservative	Frederick Smith	713	52.2	+1.1
Liberal	Arthur Otway	652	47.8	−1.1
Majority		61	4.4	+2.2
Turnout		1,365	88.4	−1.5
Registered electors		1,544		
Conservative hold		Swing	+1.1	

=== Elections in the 1860s ===
General election 1865: Chatham
Party	Candidate	Votes	%	±%
Liberal	Arthur Otway	986	58.3	+10.5
Conservative	George Elliot	704	41.7	−10.5
Majority		282	16.6	N/A
Turnout		1,690	80.3	−8.1
Registered electors		2,104		
Liberal gain from Conservative		Swing	+10.5	

General election 1868: Chatham
Party	Candidate	Votes	%	±%
Liberal	Arthur Otway	2,042	52.4	−5.9
Conservative	George Elliot	1,858	47.6	+5.9
Majority		184	4.8	−11.8
Turnout		3,900	86.3	+6.0
Registered electors		4,518		
Liberal hold		Swing	−5.9	

=== Elections in the 1870s ===
General election 1874: Chatham
Party	Candidate	Votes	%	±%
Conservative	George Elliot	2,132	59.1	+11.5
Liberal	Arthur Otway	1,476	40.9	−11.5
Majority		656	18.2	N/A
Turnout		3,608	80.8	−5.5
Registered electors		4,468		
Conservative gain from Liberal		Swing	+11.5	

Elliot resigned, causing a by-election.

By-election, 16 Feb 1875: Chatham
Party	Candidate	Votes	%	±%
Conservative	John Eldon Gorst	2,173	52.6	−6.5
Liberal	William Henry Stone	1,958	47.4	+6.5
Majority		215	5.2	−13.0
Turnout		4,131	83.7	+2.9
Registered electors		4,935		
Conservative hold		Swing	−6.5	

=== Elections in the 1880s ===
General election 1880: Chatham
Party	Candidate	Votes	%	±%
Conservative	John Eldon Gorst	2,499	51.0	−8.1
Liberal	Henry Carr Glyn	2,398	49.0	+8.1
Majority		101	2.0	−16.2
Turnout		4,897	88.3	+7.5
Registered electors		5,548		
Conservative hold		Swing	−8.1	

Gorst was appointed Solicitor General for England and Wales, requiring a by-election.

By-election, 11 Jul 1885: Chatham
Party	Candidate	Votes	%	±%
Conservative	John Eldon Gorst	Unopposed		
Conservative hold				

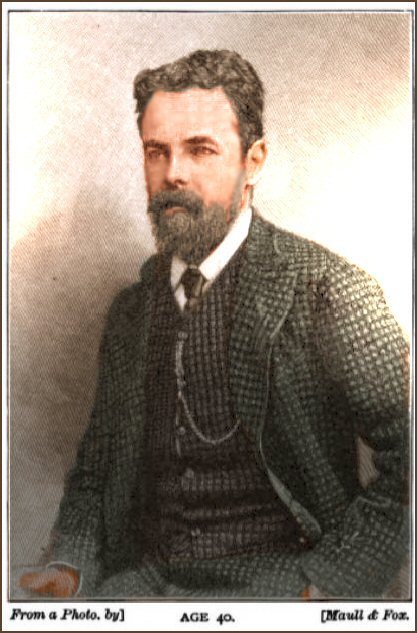
Collier

General election 1885: Chatham
Party	Candidate	Votes	%	±%
Conservative	John Eldon Gorst	3,396	56.5	+5.5
Liberal	Robert Collier	2,610	43.5	−5.5
Majority		786	13.0	+11.0
Turnout		6,006	85.9	+2.4
Registered electors		6,988		
Conservative hold		Swing	+5.5	

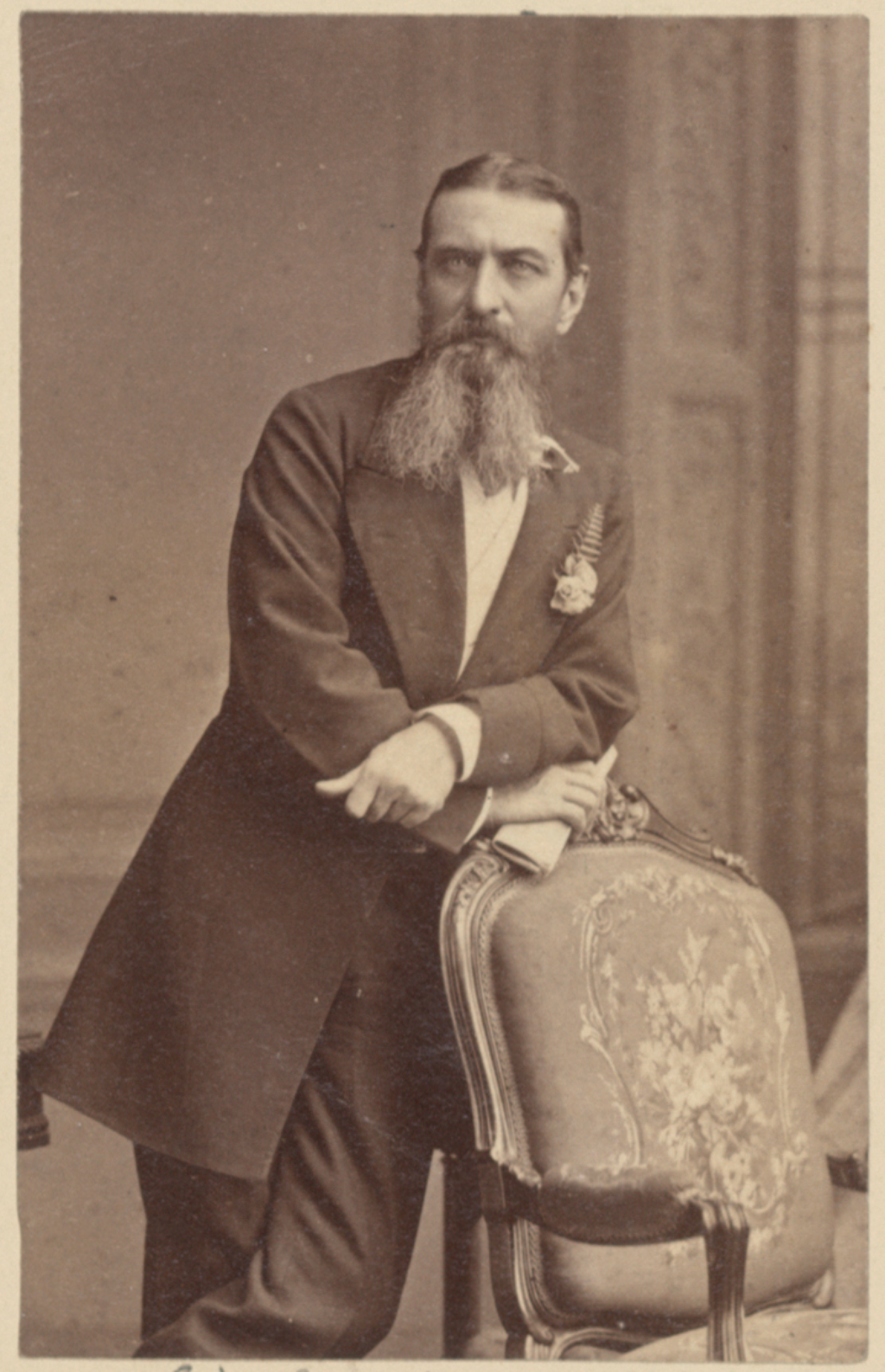
Clarke

General election 1886: Chatham
Party	Candidate	Votes	%	±%
Conservative	John Eldon Gorst	3,187	56.8	+0.3
Liberal	Andrew Clarke	2,422	43.2	−0.3
Majority		765	13.6	+0.6
Turnout		5,609	80.3	−5.6
Registered electors		6,988		
Conservative hold		Swing	+0.3	

=== Elections in the 1890s ===
General election 1892: Chatham
Party	Candidate	Votes	%	±%
Conservative	Lewis Vivian Loyd	3,777	52.6	−4.2
Liberal	Andrew Clarke	3,400	47.4	+4.2
Majority		377	5.2	−8.4
Turnout		7,177	83.2	+2.9
Registered electors		8,629		
Conservative hold		Swing	−4.2	

Davies

General election 1895: Chatham
Party	Candidate	Votes	%	±%
Conservative	Horatio Davies	4,082	53.8	+1.2
Liberal	Robert Hippisley Cox	3,499	46.2	−1.2
Majority		583	7.6	+2.4
Turnout		7,581	82.4	−0.8
Registered electors		9,199		
Conservative hold		Swing	+1.2	

=== Elections in the 1900s ===
General election 1900: Chatham
Party	Candidate	Votes	%	±%
Conservative	Horatio Davies	Unopposed		
Conservative hold				

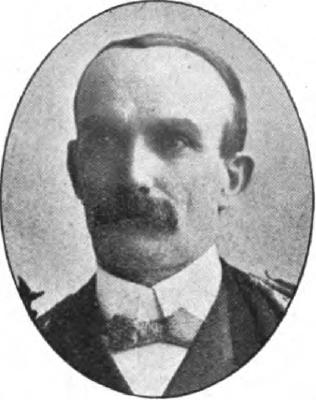
Jenkins

General election 1906: Chatham
Party	Candidate	Votes	%	±%
Labour Repr. Cmte.	John Jenkins	6,692	62.5	New
Conservative	John Eustace Jameson	4,020	37.5	N/A
Majority		2,672	25.0	N/A
Turnout		10,712	79.7	N/A
Registered electors		13,432		
Labour Repr. Cmte. gain from Conservative				

=== Elections in the 1910s ===
General election, January 1910: Chatham
Party	Candidate	Votes	%	±%
Conservative	Gerald Hohler	7,411	54.7	+17.2
Labour	John Jenkins	6,130	45.3	−17.2
Majority		1,281	9.4	N/A
Turnout		13,541	85.7	+6.0
Registered electors		15,799		
Conservative gain from Labour		Swing	+17.2	

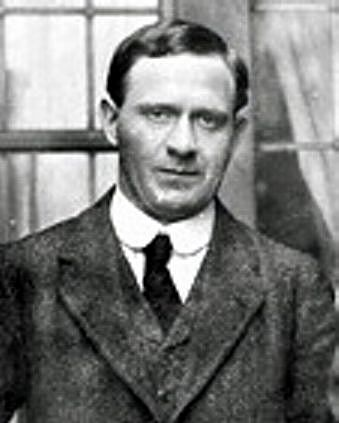
Bernacchi

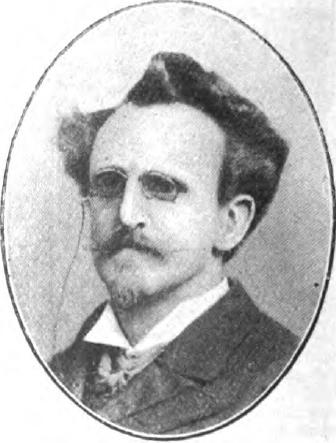
Smith

General election, December 1910: Chatham
Party	Candidate	Votes	%	±%
Conservative	Gerald Hohler	6,989	56.4	+1.7
Liberal	Louis Bernacchi	4,302	34.7	New
Labour	Frank Smith	1,103	8.9	−36.4
Majority		2,687	21.7	+12.3
Turnout		12,394	78.4	−7.3
Registered electors		15,799		
Conservative hold				

Woodcock

General election 1918: Chatham
Party	Candidate	Votes	%	±%
Unionist	John Moore-Brabazon	11,454	62.4	+6.0
Labour	Dansy Hubbard	4,134	22.5	+13.6
Liberal	H. B. D. Woodcock	2,778	15.1	−19.6
Majority		7,320	39.9	+18.2
Turnout		18,366	59.2	−19.2
Registered electors		31,000		
Unionist hold		Swing	-3.8	

=== Elections in the 1920s ===
General election 1922: Chatham
Party	Candidate	Votes	%	±%
Unionist	John Moore-Brabazon	11,335	51.5	−10.9
Liberal	Alfred John Callaghan	10,682	48.5	+33.4
Majority		653	3.0	−36.9
Turnout		22,017	69.8	+10.6
Registered electors		31,525		
Unionist hold		Swing	−22.1	

Hamilton

General election 1923: Chatham
Party	Candidate	Votes	%	±%
Unionist	John Moore-Brabazon	9,994	41.6	−9.9
Liberal	Alfred John Callaghan	8,227	34.3	−14.2
Labour	Mary Hamilton	5,794	24.1	New
Majority		1,767	7.3	+4.3
Turnout		24,015	74.6	+4.8
Registered electors		32,212		
Unionist hold		Swing	+2.2	

Dallow

General election 1924: Chatham
Party	Candidate	Votes	%	±%
Unionist	John Moore-Brabazon	13,184	52.2	+10.6
Labour	William Harvey Moore	9,276	36.7	+12.6
Liberal	Cyril Berkeley Dallow	2,806	11.1	−23.2
Majority		3,908	15.5	+8.2
Turnout		25,266	77.8	+3.2
Registered electors		32,481		
Unionist hold		Swing	+10.6	

General election 1929: Chatham
Party	Candidate	Votes	%	±%
Labour	Frank Markham	13,007	42.6	+5.9
Unionist	John Moore-Brabazon	12,231	40.1	−12.1
Liberal	George H Bryans	5,284	17.3	+6.2
Majority		776	2.5	N/A
Turnout		30,522	74.5	−3.3
Registered electors		40,980		
Labour gain from Unionist		Swing	+9.0	

=== Elections in the 1930s ===
General election 1931: Chatham
Party	Candidate	Votes	%	±%
Conservative	Park Goff	19,991	62.5	+22.4
Labour	Oliver Baldwin	10,837	33.9	−8.7
New Party	Martin Woodroffe	1,135	3.6	New
Majority		9,154	28.6	New
Turnout		31,963	75.5	+1.0
Registered electors		42,356		
Conservative gain from Labour		Swing	+15.6	

The sitting MP Sydney Frank Markham sought re-election as a National Labour candidate. However, the Conservatives refused to withdraw in his favour. As a result, he was forced to withdraw. Communist candidate Walter Hannington was also adopted but subsequently withdrew.

General election 1935: Chatham
Party	Candidate	Votes	%	±%
Conservative	Leonard Plugge	19,212	59.1	−3.4
Labour	Hugh Gaitskell	13,315	40.9	+7.0
Majority		5,897	18.2	−10.4
Turnout		32,527	74.6	−0.9
Registered electors		43,573		
Conservative hold		Swing	−5.3	

=== Elections in the 1940s ===
General election 1945: Chatham
Party	Candidate	Votes	%	±%
Labour	Arthur Bottomley	19,250	55.3	+14.4
Conservative	Leonard Plugge	15,534	44.7	−14.4
Majority		3,716	10.6	N/A
Turnout		34,784	72.1	−2.5
Registered electors		48,270		
Labour gain from Conservative		Swing	+14.4	
