= Gail Benson =

Gail Benson may refer to:

- Gale Benson (1944–1972), British model and socialite who was murdered
- Gayle Benson (born 1947), American businesswoman
