= William Evelyn Kingwell =

British bank cashier

- Born: 1889; Edmonton, Middlesex
- Died: 19 January 1947 (aged 57–58)
- Occupations: Banker and disc jockey
- Known for: First disc jockey to broadcast in English from France

William Evelyn Kingwell (1889 – 19 January 1947) was a British bank cashier who on 6 September 1931 was the first disc jockey to broadcast in English from France after he was recruited by Leonard Plugge to introduce records on a Sunday evening show on Radio Fécamp in Normandy.

== Early life and family ==
Kingwell was born in Edmonton, Middlesex, in 1889, the son of a bank inspector.

He married Jessie.

== First World War ==
Kingwell served in the Royal Field Artillery during the First World War. He was promoted to second lieutenant in 1914 but was injured during a gas attack and returned to England.

He also served in the Royal West Kent Regiment.

== Career ==
Kingwell's father had intended him for a career in banking from an early age which he had started before it was interrupted by the First World War. After his war service, Kingwell returned to banking, working for Lloyds on attachment as chief cashier at a Lloyds/National Provincial branch in Le Havre, France.

It was at the bank that Kingwell met the radio entrepreneur Leonard Plugge who needed money to buy gramophone records for his new International Broadcasting Company (IBC) and got chatting with Kingwell. He asked him if he knew anyone who could introduce records on radio every Sunday night and Kingwell replied that he would be glad to do the job. The first broadcast took place on 6 September 1931 using transmitter time that Plugge had bought from Radio Fécamp in Normandy making Kingwell the first "disc jockey", a term invented later, to broadcast in English from France.

Kingwell found the work difficult, possibly due to the after-effects of his gas injury during the war, and on one occasion lost his voice and had to get his son to take his place. Later, he was joined by Major Max Staniforth before giving up presenting entirely.

== Death ==
Kingwell died on 19 January 1947. Administration of his estate was granted to his widow, Jessie. He left an estate of £520.

== See also ==
- History of radio disc jockeys
