= Iman Mersal =

Egyptian poet (born 1966)

- إيمان مرسال
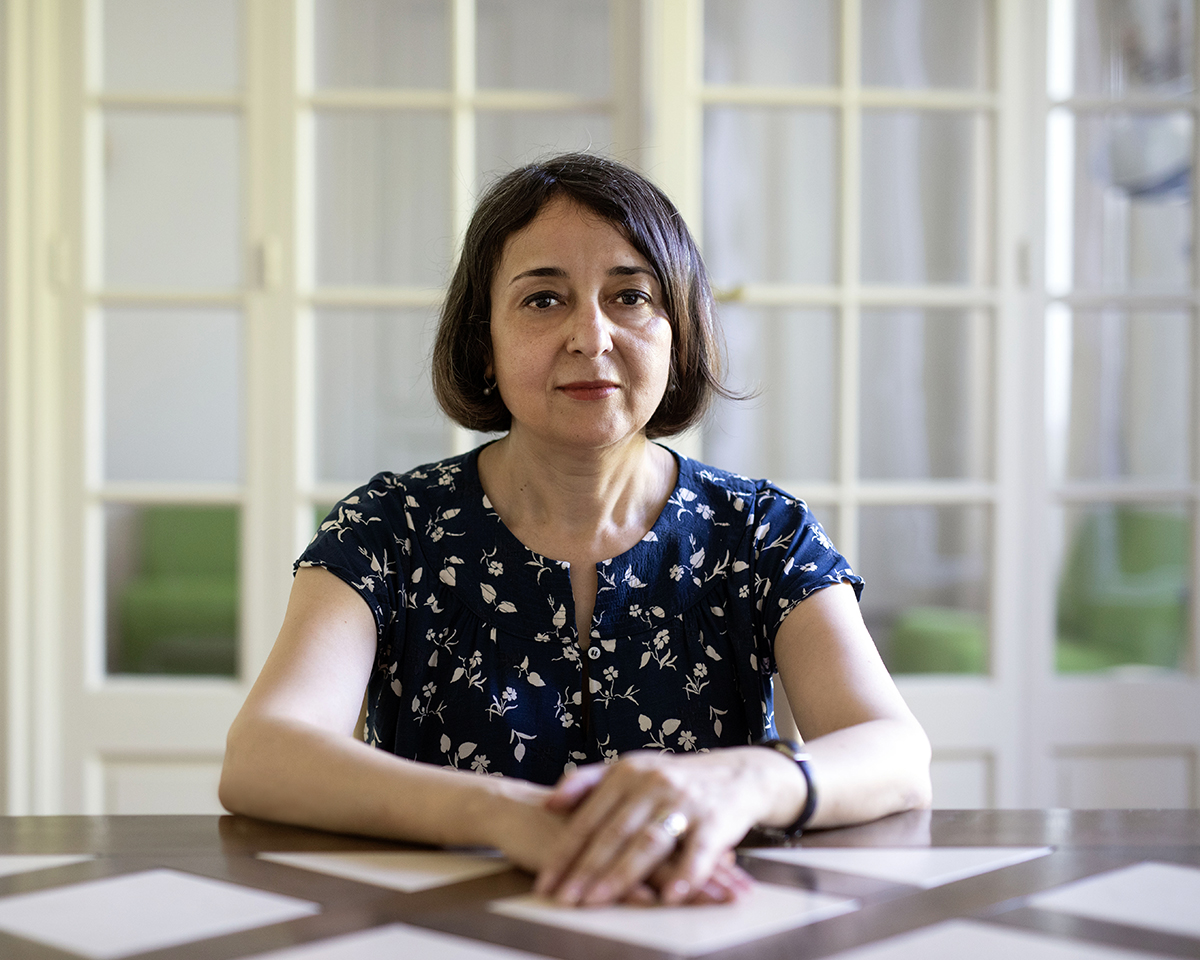
- Mersal in 2021
- Born: November 30, 1966 (age 59); Dakahlia, Egypt
- Education: Mansoura University Cairo University (MA, PhD)
- Occupation: Poet
- Writing career
- Period: 1986–present
- Notable awards: 2021 Sheikh Zayed Book Award; James Tait Black Prize

Iman Mersal (Arabic: إيمان مرسال; born November 30, 1966, Mit 'Adlan, Dakahlia, Egypt) is an Egyptian writer, poet, academic and translator. Her books include The Threshold and Traces of Enayat.

== Biography ==
Iman Mersal graduated from Mansoura University, and received her MA and PhD from Cairo University. She co-founded Bint al-Ard (Daughter of the Earth), which she co-edited from 1986 to 1992. She immigrated to Boston, in 1998, and then to Edmonton, Alberta with her family in 1999. Since 2024, Mersal serves as associate professor of Arabic literature at the University of Alberta.

Mersal's work Traces of Enayat won the 2021 Sheikh Zayed Book Award, making her the first woman to win its Literature category. The book also won the James Tait Black Prize for Biography and was shortlisted for the 2024 National Book Critics Circle Gregg Barrios Book in Translation Prize, Saif Ghobash Banipal Prize. The book was also second selected by Le Prix Jan Michalski de littérature. Her poetry collection, The Threshold, won the 2023 Canadian National Translation Award and was shortlisted for the 2023 Griffin Poetry Award.

Her work has appeared in Blackbird, The American Poetry Review,Parnassus,The New York Review of Books, and Paris Review. She has read at numerous poetry festivals around the world, including the London Poetry Parnassus, billed as the biggest gathering of poets in world history, where she represented Egypt.

Selected poems from Mersal's oeuvre have been translated into numerous languages, including English, French, German, Spanish, Dutch, Macedonian, Hindi, and Hebrew. These Are Not Oranges, My Love, a selection of Mersal's work translated into English by Khaled Mattawa, was published by Sheep Meadow Press, New York in 2008.

One of her poems was selected for inclusion in the volume Fifty Greatest Love Poems. Another ("Solitude Exercises") concludes a chronological anthology featuring 38 Arab poets spanning 15 centuries, from Imru' al-Qays to Mahmoud Darwish.

In her book How to Mend: On Motherhood and its Ghosts, Iman Mersal "navigates a long and winding road, from the only surviving picture of the author has with her mother, to a deep search through what memory, photography, dreams and writing, a search of what is lost between the mainstream and more personal representations of motherhood and its struggles. How to mend the gap between the representation and the real, the photograph and its subject, the self and the other, the mother and her child." The book was first published in Arabic by Kayfa ta and Mophradat in 2016, and the English edition was published in 2018 by Kayfa ta and Sternberg Press. A new edition was published in 2025 by Transit Books.

== Personal life ==
Mersal married ethnomusicologist Michael Frishkopf in 1997. Together, they have two children; Mourad, born in 1999 and Youssef, born two years later.

== Works ==
- 1990. Ittisafat (Characterizations). Cairo: Dar al-Ghad.
- 1995. Mamarr mu'tim yasluh lita'allum al-raqs (A Dark Alley Suitable for Learning to Dance), first edition. Cairo: Dar Sharqiyat.
- 1997. al-Mashy Atwal Waqt Mumkin (Walking As Long As Possible). Cairo: Dar Sharqiyat.
- 2004. Mamarr mu'tim yasluh lita'allum al-raqs (A Dark Alley Suitable for Learning to Dance), second edition, Cairo: Dar Sharqiyat.
- 2006. Jughrafiya Badila (Alternative Geography). Cairo: Dar Sharqiyat.
- 2013. Hatta atakhalla `an fikrat al-buyut (Until I Give Up The Idea Of Home) Cairo: Dar Sharqiyat, Beirut: Dar al-Tanwir.
- 2016. Kayfa talta'em: 'an al umuma wa ashbahuha (How to Mend: Motherhood and its ghosts). Cairo: Kayfa ta, Brussels: Mophradat. ISBN 978-3-956791-70-3
- 2019. Fi Athar Enayat al-Zayyat (In the footsteps of Enayat al-Zayyat). Cairo: Al Kotob Khan.

=== Translation to Arabic ===
- 2011. بيرة في نادي البلياردو Bira fi Nadi al-Bilyardu. (Beer in the Snooker Club), Waguih Ghali, Iman Mersal, co-translator. Cairo: Dar el- Shrouk.
- 2016. ذبابة في الحساء. (A Fly in the Soup), Charles Simic, Iman Mersal, translator. Cairo: El-Kotob Khan.
- 2024. قراءة غير مُلزمة Qira’a Ghayr Mulzima. (Arabic translation of prose work Lektury nadobowiązkowe by Wisława Szymborska, via Clare Cavanagh's English translation, Nonrequired Reading). Forthcoming from Kotob Khan, November 2024, Cairo.

=== Works in English ===
- 2008. These are not oranges, my love: selected poems, Sheep Meadow Press, ISBN 978-1-931357-54-8
- 2018. How to Mend: Motherhood and its ghosts. Cairo: Kayfa ta, Berlin: Sternberg Press. Translated by Robin Moger. ISBN 978-3-95679-425-4
- 2019: Contributor to A New Divan: Lyrical Dialogue Between East and West ISBN 9781909942288
- 2022: The Threshold: Poems. trans. Robyn Creswell. Farrar, Straus and Giroux. ISBN 978-0374604271
- 2023: Traces of Enayat. Tran. Robin Moger. And Other Stories. ASIN : B0BSSL2FVB
- 2024: Traces of Enayat. trans. Robin Moger. Transit Books. ISBN 978-1945492846
- 2025: Motherhood and its Ghosts. trans. Robin Moger. Transit Books. ISBN 979-8893380170

== Awards and honors ==
- 2021, Sheikh Zayed Book Award for Traces of Enayat. The book was also a finalist for the 2024 The National Book Critics Circle Gregg Barrios Book in Translation Prize, Saif Ghobash Banipal Prize.
- 2023, James Tait Black Memorial Prize
- 2026, Cafavy International Poetry Award
- 2012–2013 Scholar, The Berlin Forum Transregionale Studien - Europe in the Middle East - The Middle East in Europe (EUME) in collaboration with the Free University of Berlin.
- 2017–2018 Fellow, Canada Council for the Arts - Writers Creative Writing Program, September 2017 - June 2018.
- 2021 Titulaire de la Chaire Albert Camus, The Aix-Marseille Institute for Advanced Studies (IMéRA/AMIDEX-AMU).

Her book The Threshold was a finalist for the 2023 Griffin Poetry Prize and won the 2023 National Translation Award.

She was elected for a 2024–2025 Cullman Center for Scholars and Writers Fellowship at the New York Public Library
