= Zayat (surname) =

Zayat or El-Zayat are an occupational surname originating in Spain and the Middle East. It is most prevalent in the Egypt, Lebanon the United States, and Spain. The name refers to refers the occupation of Oil Merchants.

== Etymology ==
It comes from the Arabic root “زيت” (zayt), which means “oil” or "aceite" in Spanish —most commonly olive oil, a central product in the Mediterranean basin in Medieval times for food, lighting, and trade. the name refers to “the oil seller” or “the oil merchant”.

== Zayat surname among Sephardic Jews ==
There are many indicators that the name Zayat may be of Jewish origin, emanating from the Jewish communities of Spain and Portugal following the Spanish reconquest of Ibeira. The approximately 750,000 Jews living in Spain in the year 1492 were banished from the country by royal decree of Ferdinand and Isabella, records show that the name Zayat was found among the banished Jews, the Jewish Zayat were probably Olive Oil Merchant or Workers who adopted the occupational surname during Al-Andalus period.

The surname now is found among Muslims and Christians in Egypt, Morocco, Syria, Lebanon, Spain, Iran and Sephardic Jews.

Notable people with the surnames include:

- Ahmed Zayat (born 1962), Egyptian - American Jewish racehorse owner
- Fouad al-Zayat, Syrian businessman
- Habib Zayat (1874–1954), French orientalist and writer
- Ibrahim El-Zayat
- Montasser el-Zayat (born 1956), Egyptian lawyer
- Mohamed El-Zayat
- Habib El-Zayat, Lebanese politician
- Muhammad ibn al-Zayyat, a Persian merchant and Vizier
- Ibn al-Zayyat, (governor of Tarsus)
- Ibn al-Zayyat al-Tadili, a Sufi Mystic
- Ibrahim El-Zayat
- Ahmed Hassan Zayat, Egyptian Poet
- Enayat al-Zayyat, Egyptian writer
- Latifa al-Zayat, Egyptian writer

Notable locations based on Zayat name:

- Mrah Ez Ziyat, a village in Batroun District, Lebanon. The majority of the town is Maronite who have the Surname Zayat.
- Kafr Az-Zayyat, a city in the Nile Delta, Egypt

== See also ==
- Zayats
