= Beer in the Snooker Club =

1964 novel by Waguih Ghali

Beer In The Snooker Club
- First UK edition
- Author: Waguih Ghali
- Language: English
- Publisher: Andre Deutsch (UK); Knopf (US)
- Publication date: 1964
- Publication place: Egypt - England

Beer In The Snooker Club is a semi-autobiographical novel by the Egyptian writer Waguih Ghali written in English and first published in 1964.

== Structure ==
On the surface, the novel reads as a typical post-colonial novel; the Francophone, British educated Egyptian Coptic protagonists struggle with their conflicting allegiances to the English culture that produced and imposed colonialism, and to the Egyptian revolution that opposed colonialism but also implemented repressive domestic policies. The novel ultimately rejects the mediated binaries of post-coloniality, searching instead for a notion of cosmopolitan identity, defined both as a historically and locally situated urban subject and as a politically engaged 'citizen of the world'.

== Plot ==
Behind the bar at Jameel's in Cairo hang two mugs engraved with the names of Ram, the protagonist, and Font. During their years together in London, they drank many a pint of Bass from these mugs. But there is no Bass in Nasser's Egypt – so Ram and Font have to make do with a heady mixture of beer, vodka and whisky. Yearning for Bass, they long to be far from a revolution that neither serves the people nor allows their rich aunts to live the life of leisure they are accustomed to. Stranded between two cultures, Ram and Font must choose between dangerous political opposition and reluctant acquiescence.

== Reception ==
According to author Diana Athill, Beer in the Snooker Club is "a classic of the literature of emigration."

Ahdaf Soueif wrote that "Beer in the Snooker Club is one of the best novels about Egypt ever written. In the protagonist, Ram, a passionate nationalist who is nonetheless an anglophile, Waguih Ghali creates a hero who is tragic, funny and sympathetic. Through him we are presented with an authentic and acutely observed account of Egyptian society at a time of great upheaval. It is marvellously cheering that this novel is available again after twenty years."

Gabriel Josipovici wrote "This is a wonderful book. Quiet, understated, seemingly without any artistic or formal pretensions. Yet quite devastating in its human and political insights... if you want to convey to someone what Egypt was like in the forties and fifties, and why it is impossible for Europeans or Americans to understand, give them this book. It makes The Alexandria Quartet look like the travel brochure it is."

Writing in The Observer, Rachel Aspden feels that the book "may be angry, but it is also extremely funny. Ghali neatly skewers the pretensions of the Cairene elite along with the hypocrisies of empire... In Ghali's Cairo, almost everything is phoney."

== Related Books ==
- Diana Athill. After a Funeral. London: Cape, 1986. - winner of the J. R. Ackerley Prize for Autobiography
