= Seberg =

2019 film by Benedict Andrews

- Theatrical release poster
- Directed by: Benedict Andrews
- Written by: Joe Shrapnel; Anna Waterhouse
- Produced by: Marina Acton; Fred Berger; Kate Garwood; Stephen Hopkins; Brian Kavanaugh-Jones; Bradley Pilz; Alan Ritchson
- Starring: Kristen Stewart; Jack O'Connell; Margaret Qualley; Zazie Beetz; Vince Vaughn; Anthony Mackie
- Cinematography: Rachel Morrison
- Edited by: Pamela Martin
- Music by: Jed Kurzel
- Production companies: Automatik Entertainment; Bradley Pilz Productions; Phreaker Films; Ingenious Media; Totally Commercial Films
- Distributed by: Amazon Studios (United States); Universal Pictures (United Kingdom)
- Release dates: August 30, 2019 (Venice); December 13, 2019 (United States); January 10, 2020 (United Kingdom)
- Running time: 102 minutes
- Countries: United States; United Kingdom
- Language: English
- Budget: $8 million
- Box office: $1.3 million

Seberg is a 2019 political thriller film directed by Benedict Andrews, from a screenplay by Joe Shrapnel and Anna Waterhouse based on the life of actess Jean Seberg. It stars Kristen Stewart, Jack O'Connell, Margaret Qualley, Zazie Beetz, Anthony Mackie, and Vince Vaughn.

The film had its world premiere at the Venice Film Festival on August 30, 2019. It was released in the United Kingdom on January 10, 2020, by Universal Pictures and in North America on February 21, 2020, by Amazon Studios, after an awards-qualifying run on December 13, 2019.

== Plot ==
Jean Seberg, an American actress known for playing the female lead in Jean-Luc Godard's film Breathless, bids her husband, Romain Gary, and child farewell in Paris before leaving for Los Angeles. On the airline flight in first class, she witnesses a Black passenger insisting on sitting in first class and offering to pay for the seats. The man demands preferential treatment for Malcolm X's widow, claiming she should be treated like "royalty". Seberg appears to be attracted to the passenger, who introduces himself as Hakim Jamal, a member of the Black Panther Party (BPP).

Upon landing in the U.S., Seberg notices a group of Black activists protesting at the airport, expressing their displeasure with the treatment Jamal and his traveling companions received on the flight. She joins them and, in a gesture of solidarity, raises her fist in a Black power salute. Unbeknownst to Seberg, undercover FBI agents, including Jack Solomon, are at the airport. Solomon suggests the FBI shadow her activities while she is in the U.S., and arranges to have her phone conversations tapped due to her apparent association with the Black Power movement.

After telling Jamal she knows the incident on the plane was staged to get her attention, Seberg begins a sexual relationship with him, despite both of them being married. The FBI's surveillance program COINTELPRO begins to target Seberg, recording her and Jamal having sex and playing it to Jamal's wife, Dorothy, over the phone.

Jamal ends things with Seberg after Dorothy confronts him, leaving Seberg devastated. She becomes increasingly suspicious, fearing her daily life is being monitored. Solomon anonymously calls Seberg to warn her to sever her ties with the movement.

Seberg becomes pregnant by an unknown person. Continuing their surveillance and harassment of her for years, COINTELPRO agents create a rumor that the baby was fathered by a member of the BPP and feed it to the media. Seberg attempts suicide, which leads to the miscarriage of her unborn daughter. The combination of her daughter's death and the FBI's smear campaign about the child's paternity send her into a deep depression.

Seberg announces she will sue the publication that published the rumor. Solomon, wanting to come clean, shows her the FBI file on her at a bar, confirming her suspicions. After that encounter is depicted, the real-life Seberg is explained to have moved back to Paris while still supporting the BPP, and died in 1979 due to probable suicide.

== Cast ==
- Kristen Stewart as Jean Seberg
- Jack O'Connell as Jack Solomon
- Anthony Mackie as Hakim Jamal
- Margaret Qualley as Linette Solomon
- Colm Meaney as Frank Ellroy
- Zazie Beetz as Dorothy Jamal
- Vince Vaughn as Carl Kowalski
- Yvan Attal as Romain Gary
- Gabriel Sky as Diego Gary
- Stephen Root as Walt Breckman
- Cornelius Smith Jr. as Ray Robertson
- Jade Pettyjohn as Jenny Kowalski
- Ser'Darius Blain as Louis Lewis
- James Jordan as Roy Maddow

== Production ==
In March 2018, it was announced Kristen Stewart, Jack O'Connell, Anthony Mackie, Margaret Qualley and Colm Meaney had joined the cast of the film, then titled Against All Enemies. Benedict Andrews would direct the film from a screenplay by Joe Shrapnel and Anna Waterhouse. Fred Berger, Brian Kavanaugh-Jones, Kate Garwood, Stephen Hopkins, Bradley Pilz, would produce the film under their Automatik and Bradley Pilz Productions banners, respectively. In April 2018, Zazie Beetz joined the cast of the film. In May 2018, Vince Vaughn, Yvan Attal and Stephen Root joined the cast of the film. In June 2018, Cornelius Smith Jr. and Jade Pettyjohn joined the cast of the film. In July 2018, Ser'Darius Blain joined the cast of the film.

Principal production started on June 30, 2018, in Los Angeles. Production concluded on August 2, 2018.

== Release ==
Amazon Studios acquired distribution rights to Against All Enemies in February 2019. The film was retitled Seberg, and had its world premiere out of competition at the Venice Film Festival on August 30, 2019. Universal Pictures distributed the film in select international territories outside of America. It also screened at the Toronto International Film Festival on September 7, 2019. The film was released in the United States on December 13, 2019, in an Oscar qualifying run, before being released on February 21, 2020. and in the United Kingdom on January 10, 2020.

== Reception ==
=== Critical response ===
On review aggregation website Rotten Tomatoes, the film holds an approval rating of 36% based on 140 reviews, with an average rating of 5.5/10. The site's critical consensus reads, "Seberg's frustratingly superficial treatment of a fascinating true story does a disservice to its subject—and Kristen Stewart's performance in the central role." On Metacritic, the film holds a weighted average score of 54 out of 100, based on 28 critics, indicating "mixed or average reviews".

Time's annual best performances of the year list by Stephanie Zacharek listed Stewart as the tenth best performance of 2019.

=== Accolades ===
Award	Date of ceremony	Category	Recipient(s)	Result	Ref.
Alliance of Women Film Journalists	2020	Actress Most in Need of a New Agent	Kristen Stewart	Nominated	
Camerimage	November 16, 2019	Best Directorial Debut	Benedict Andrews	Nominated	
San Sebastián International Film Festival	2020	City of Donostia Audience Award	Benedict Andrews	Nominated	
