= Leonard Plugge =

British politician (1889–1981)

Captain Leonard Plugge MP
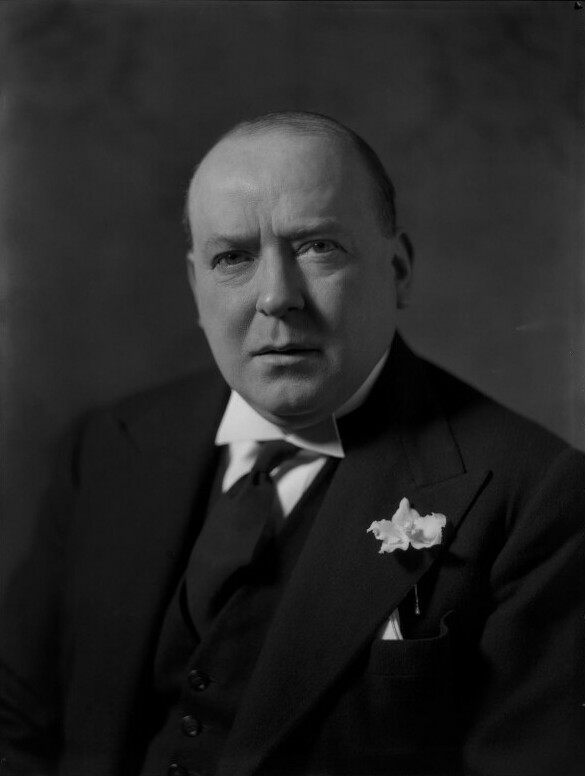
- Plugge in 1936

Member of Parliament for Chatham
- In office 14 November 1935 – 15 June 1945
- Preceded by: Park Goff
- Succeeded by: Arthur Bottomley

Personal details
- Born: Leonard Frank Plugge; 21 September 1889
- Died: 19 February 1981 (aged 91)
- Party: Conservative
- Spouse: Ann Muckleston (m. 1935, separated)
- Children: 3, including Gale Benson

Captain Leonard Frank Plugge (21 September 1889 – 19 February 1981) was a British radio entrepreneur and Conservative Party politician.

== Early years and political life ==
Plugge was born in Walworth, only son of Frank Plugge (1864–1946), a commercial clerk, and his wife, Mary Chase (1862–1924). His father was a Belgian of Dutch descent. Plugge was educated at Dulwich College, the University of Brussels and University College London, where he graduated with a BSc degree in civil engineering in 1915. In the First World War, he joined the Royal Naval Volunteer Reserve and in 1918 transferred to the Royal Air Force, where he became a captain. He stayed with the air force until 1921, and in the same year was elected a Fellow of the Royal Aeronautical Society.

Plugge was elected Member of Parliament (MP) for Chatham in 1935, defeating the Labour candidate Hugh Gaitskell by a majority of 5,897 votes. He lost in 1945 to Arthur Bottomley, a future Minister of Overseas Development in Harold Wilson's first government.

== Offshore years ==
Plugge created the International Broadcasting Company in 1931 as a commercial rival to the British Broadcasting Corporation by buying airtime from radio stations such as those of Normandy, Toulouse, Ljubljana, Juan les Pins, Paris, Poste Parisien, Athlone, Barcelona, Madrid and Rome. IBC worked indirectly with Radio Luxembourg until 1936. World War II silenced most of Plugge's stations between 1939 and 1945.

Plugge, a radio enthusiast, would collect the schedules of radio stations he visited during long motoring holidays on the European continent and sell them to the BBC to publish in Radio Times and other magazines such as Wireless World. On one such journey, Plugge asked the café owner at the Café Colonne, located in the coastal village of Fécamp, Normandy, what there was to see in the town. He was told that a young member of the Le Grand family – which owned the town's Benedictine distillery – had a small radio transmitter behind a piano in his house, and that a local cobbler's business had increased after his name was mentioned during a broadcast.

Plugge went to see Fernand Le Grand and offered to buy time to broadcast programmes in English. Le Grand agreed, and a studio was set up in the loft over the old stables in rue George Cuvier, from which the programmes were broadcast by Plugge's employees. The first presenter was a cashier from the National Provincial Bank's Le Havre branch named William Evelyn Kingwell, whom Plugge had met when drawing cash after leaving Le Grand. Kingwell agreed to motorcycle over on Sundays to introduce records.

Kingwell fell ill and Plugge brought in new announcers, including Max Staniforth and Stephen Williams, and later Bob Danvers-Walker and general manager-cum-presenter David Davies, who, after the war, became station manager and managing director of the English-language 'offshore' broadcaster, LM Radio (Radio Lourenco Marques), Mozambique, from 1947 to 1969. Many others joined during the life of Radio Normandy (the station used this anglicised spelling in its British literature and advertising).

The power of the transmitter increased after Plugge convinced film studio and 280-strong cinema chain owner Gaumont British, owner of the Sunday Referee, an entertainment-based Sunday newspaper to sponsor him and print Radio Normandy's schedule. A new studio was established in a house in the town.

Radio Normandy by now had a large audience as far north as the English Midlands, and many big names of the day. Among them was Roy Plomley, later famous for creating and presenting Desert Island Discs for BBC radio.

=== Silenced ===
Plugge broadcast from Fécamp and later from a new transmitter and studio at Caudebec-en-Caux, France. World War II began soon after the studio opened and, according to some histories, German troops overran the transmitters in 1940, using them to broadcast propaganda to Britain until the RAF bombed the Louvetot transmitter out of action. The French website L'Histoire de Radio Normandie remembers it differently: "After the Louvetot transmitter closed in 1939 because of the war, IBC went on broadcasting under the name Radio International Fécamp from Radio Normandie's first transmitter at Fécamp for "several weeks". On 10 June 1940 French troops sabotaged the transmitter on the eve of the German invasion.'

A 22 October 1939 British War Cabinet memo marked 'SECRET: To Be Kept Under Lock And Key' notes that:

It was learnt that an obsolete station at Fécamp, controlled by the International Broadcasting Company (of which Captain L. F. Plugge, MP, is the chairman), has been modernised, and had started to work with programmes in English, Czech and Austrian [sic]. The danger of allowing a station so near the Channel to work on its own...was felt by the Air Ministry to be grave...The French Service(s)...are in complete agreement with the British point of view...[and] have confessed that the private interests concerned have got the ear of the civil powers [in France] without reference to factors of national security. It is hoped that the French Service view will shortly prevail.

It appears the British government was not interested in Plugge's invitation to broadcast Allied propaganda from Radio Normandy transmitters, even if they had not been destroyed.

Plugge hoped to restart transmissions from France after the war but changes in broadcasting regulations and a different attitude to radio listening meant that this never happened. The post-war president, Charles de Gaulle, also had a different attitude to the station.

Radio Normandy had a bigger audience in southern England on Sundays than the BBC. Under Lord Reith, the BBC was off the air until late on Sundays to give people time to go to church, and offered little but serious music and discussions. Broadcasting historians have said that Reith reluctantly agreed to lighten the BBC's programmes on Sundays after his audience deserted him for Radio Normandy's light music. That, some have said, was a reason that Reith left the BBC, feeling his mission to educate, inform and entertain with what he judged to be programmes of high moral tone had been cut away by rank commercial entertainment driven by money.

The IBC's original London offices were in Hallam Street, near the BBC's Broadcasting House, then moved to nearby 35–36 Portland Place. This was taken over by a British weapons development unit MRI(c) at the start of the war but later bombed. The BBC's Radio 1, inheritor of the audiences that Plugge's offshore successors had built until the 1967 Marine Broadcasting Offences Act made them illegal, later moved into the Hallam Street building. After the war IBC became a recording studio and stars including The Who, The Kinks, The Rolling Stones and Jimi Hendrix recorded there.

It has been suggested that Leonard Plugge was the inventor of the two-way car radiotelephone. It is also claimed that the term of "plugging" something by advertising was derived from the name of Leonard Plugge. Plugge pronounced his name "Plooje", claiming Flemish origins. It was only when he stood for the parliamentary seat of Chatham that he agreed to the slogan "Plugge in for Chatham" and accepted the way everybody else pronounced his name.

== Later life ==
In the 1960s and 1970s, Plugge moved in a social set that included Princess Margaret, her husband photographer Anthony Armstrong-Jones, broadcaster Julian Pettifer, Molly Parkin and English model April Ashley.

The film Performance, starring Mick Jagger and James Fox, was partly filmed in Plugge's house in Lowndes Square. Plugge moved to Hollywood, California in 1972, and died there on 19 February 1981 at the age of 91.

== Family ==
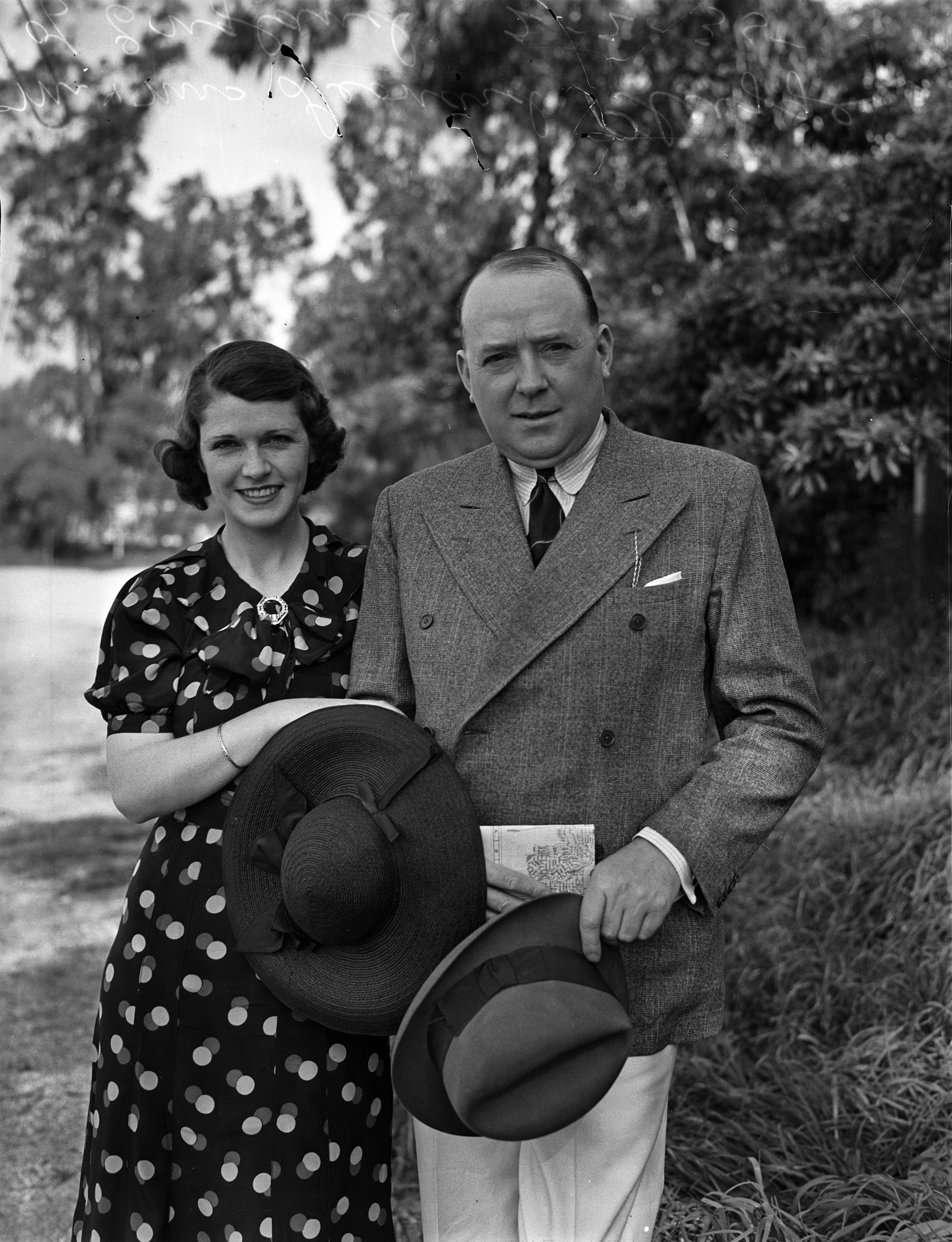
Ann and Leonard Plugge, 1935

Captain Plugge married (Gertrude) Ann Muckleston (13 January 1909 – 1993) in New York on 28 October 1935, a little over two weeks before he was elected to the House of Commons. They had three children. Plugge and his wife separated in the early 1950s.

His daughter Gale Ann, who had married and divorced Jonathan Benson, was in Trinidad with her partner, the American Black Power leader Hakim Jamal, when she was stabbed and buried alive in January 1972 by Stanley Abbott and Edward Chadee, allegedly on the orders of Michael X whom Jamal also followed.

Her twin brother, Greville, died in a road accident in Morocco a year later.

== Etymology of "to plug" ==
In his book Red Herrings and White Elephants, the English language researcher Albert Jack writes that Plugge partially financed Radio Normandy by receiving payments to play and promote records, which is probably the origin of the verb to "plug" a record. However, the Oxford English Dictionary contradicts this suggestion, dating the first use of "plug" in the sense of "promotion" to as early as 1900.

Rupert Vansittart played Plugge in the 2008 film The Bank Job.

Parliament of the United Kingdom
Preceded by Sir Park Goff	Member of Parliament for Chatham; 1935–1945	Succeeded by Arthur Bottomley
