= Hattie Morahan =

English actress (born 1978)

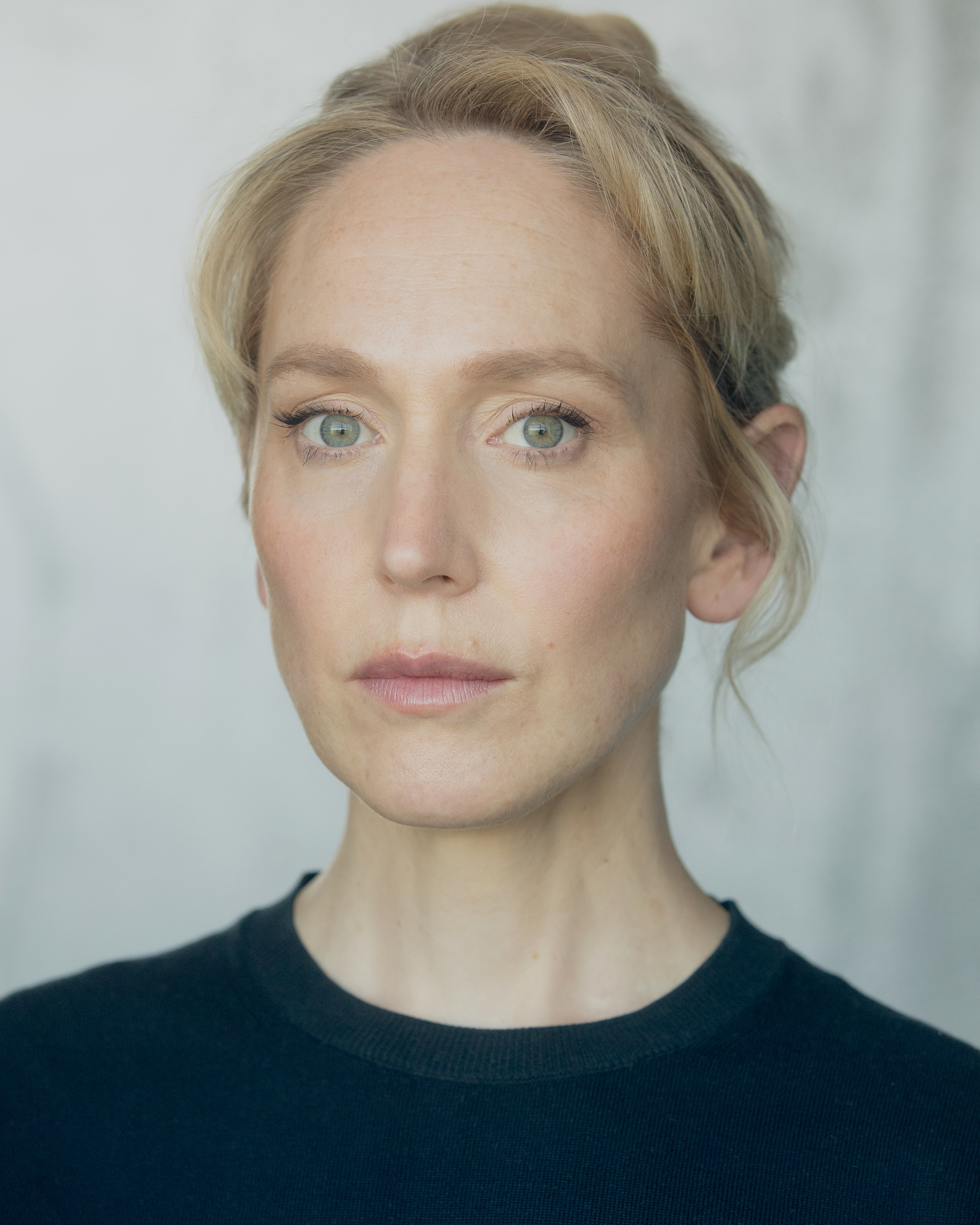
- Born: Harriet Jane Morahan; 7 October 1978 (age 48); Lambeth, London, England
- Occupation: Actress
- Years active: 1996–present
- Partner: Blake Ritson
- Children: 2
- Parents: Christopher Morahan (father); Anna Carteret (mother)
- Relatives: Andy Morahan (half-brother)

Harriet Jane Morahan (born 7 October 1978), better known as Hattie Morahan, is an English actress. Her roles include Sister Clara in The Golden Compass (2007), Gale Benson in The Bank Job (2008), Elinor Dashwood in Sense and Sensibility (2008), Alice in The Bletchley Circle (2012–2014), Ann in Mr. Holmes (2015), Rose Coyne in My Mother and Other Strangers (2016), Agathe/The Enchantress in Beauty and the Beast (2017), Corinne Aldrich in Luther: The Fallen Sun, Louise in Hijack, and Caroline Burkett in Fool Me Once.

== Early life ==
Morahan was born in 1978, the younger daughter of director Christopher Morahan and actress Anna Carteret. Her older sister Rebecca is a theatre director, and her half-brother Andy is a music video and film director. As a child, she attended parties thrown by Sir Laurence Olivier, who once helped her with her mathematics homework.

Morahan was educated at Frensham Heights School. She wanted to attend Newcastle University, but her father encouraged her to follow older sister Rebecca to New Hall, Cambridge, from which she graduated with a BA degree in English in 2000.

== Career ==
Morahan made her professional debut at 17, playing the leading role of Una Gwithian in a two-part BBC television adaptation of The Peacock Spring (1996).

Morahan joined the Royal Shakespeare Company in 2001, making her theatre debut at Stratford-upon-Avon in Love in a Wood and her London debut at the Barbican Theatre (that December) in Hamlet. Other credits for the company included Night of the Soul and Prisoner's Dilemma.

At the Tricycle Theatre in March 2004 she played Ruby, a 1960s hippie who becomes a disenchanted 1980s political wife, for the Oxford Stage Company revival of Peter Flannery's Singer. In the same year she first worked with Katie Mitchell at the National Theatre when she starred in the title role of Euripides' Iphigenia at Aulis.

In July 2005, she appeared again at the National in Nick Dear's Power, staged in the Cottesloe Theatre and also won acclaim at the West Yorkshire Playhouse, Leeds, in September 2005 playing Viola in Ian Brown's production of Twelfth Night.

In 2006, she played the leading role, of Penelope Toop, in Douglas Hodge's touring revival of Philip King's hit farce See How They Run. In the same year, for her Lyttelton Theatre performance as Nina in Katie Mitchell's staging of Chekhov's The Seagull, she was awarded second prize in the Ian Charleson Awards 2007.

TV credits include Bodies and BBC One's Outnumbered, in which she portrays recurring character Jane. She has appeared in series 1, 2 and 4 of Outnumbered, as well as the Christmas Specials in 2009, 2011, 2012 and 2024.

In January 2008, she appeared in the film The Bank Job, and she played a mounted policewoman in the ITV comedy drama pilot Bike Squad.

Giving a career enhancing performance, she also played Elinor Dashwood in BBC One's three-part adaptation, by Andrew Davies, of Jane Austen's novel Sense and Sensibility, first broadcast on New Year's Day 2008. On 13 June 2008, she won Best Actress at the 14th Shanghai Television Festival for her performance.

She worked again with director Katie Mitchell, co-starring with Benedict Cumberbatch in The City, a new, darkly comic mystery play by Martin Crimp, 24 April – 7 June 2008.

In July 2008, she returned to the National to appear in ...some trace of her, Katie Mitchell's adaptation of Dostoyevsky's The Idiot, co-starring Ben Whishaw at the Cottesloe Theatre, while later in the year she played Mary in T.S. Eliot's The Family Reunion at the Donmar Warehouse. She returned to the National in April 2009 to play Kay Conway in Rupert Goold's production of J. B. Priestley's Time and the Conways in the Lyttelton auditorium and also Dawn in Caryl Churchill's Three More Sleepless Nights in the same season.

On 28 February 2010, she appeared as Miss Enid in Lark Rise to Candleford, and then as Martina Twain in the BBC adaptation of Martin Amis's Money. In the theatre, she played Annie in The Real Thing by Tom Stoppard at The Old Vic theatre, directed by Anna Mackmin, from April to June 2010; a year later returning to the stage in Thea Sharrock's pared-down Sheffield Crucible revival of David Hare's 1978 Plenty: Morahan affords the heady sensation of watching an actress at the top of her game (Sunday Times, Culture, 14 February 2011).

From 29 June to 26 July 2012, she played the lead role of Nora Helmer, opposite Dominic Rowan's Torvald, in a new version of A Doll's House by Simon Stephens at London's Young Vic Theatre, in a production directed by Carrie Cracknell and designed by Ian MacNeil. Her performance saw her named Best Actress at the 2012 Evening Standard Awards and the 2012 Critics' Circle Theatre Awards / She also received a nomination for an Olivier Award for her performance.

From 8 August to 26 October 2013, Morahan reprised her role as Nora Helmer alongside Dominic Rowan, who returned as her husband Torvald, at the Duke of York's Theatre London. The production then transferred to the Brooklyn Academy of Music, NY, in 2014.

In July 2015, Morahan played the role of doomed mother Elizabeth Aldridge in the BBC's two-part television adaptation of Sadie Jones' debut novel The Outcast. The Guardian's Julia Raeside was impressed with Morahan's portrayal, writing, "She is so perfectly cast, the lack of her is palpable on screen. We miss her too." The following year, Morahan starred in the five-part BBC series My Mother and Other Strangers.

== Personal life ==
Morahan is married to actor Blake Ritson. They have been in a relationship since they met at university in the late 1990s. Morahan gave birth to the couple's daughter in August 2016 and to their son in 2020.

In 2025, Morahan guest starred as Lady Sarah Vere in multiple episodes of season three of The Gilded Age. Her husband has appeared as a main character in the show since season 1.

== Credits ==
=== Film and television ===
Year	Title	Role	Notes
1996	The Peacock Spring	Una Gwithian	BBC
2002	Too Close To The Bone		Short
2004	Out of Time	Receptionist	Short
2004	New Tricks	Totty	TV series, 1 Episode
2005	Bodies	Beth Lucas-Hall	TV series, 7 episodes
2007–2011, 2024	Outnumbered	Jane	
2007	The Golden Compass	Nurse Clara	
2008	Agatha Christie's Miss Marple	Elaine Fortescue	TV series, Episode: “A Pocket Full of Rye”
2008	Sense and Sensibility	Elinor Dashwood	BBC, TV Mini-Series, 3 episodes
2008	Bike Squad	WPC Julie Cardigan	
2008	Trial & Retribution	Sally Lawson	TV series, “Kill the King: Part 1 & 2”
2008	The Bank Job	Gale Benson	
2010	Lark Rise to Candleford	Enid Fairley	TV series (1 episode)
2011	Lewis: Old, Unhappy, Far Off Things	Ruth Brooks	ITV1
2012	Eternal Law	Hannah English	TV series (6 episodes)
2013	Midsomer Murders	Hayley Brantner	TV series, Episode: "Schooled in Murder"
2013	Having You	Lucy	Feature film
2013	Summer in February	Laura Knight	Feature film
2014	The Bletchley Circle	Alice Merren	“Blood on Their Hands: Part 1 & 2”, “Uncustomed Goods: Part 1 & 2”
2015	Mr. Holmes	Ann Kelmot	
2015	Ballot Monkeys	Siobhan Hope	
2015	The Outcast	Elizabeth Aldridge	TV series (1 episode)
2015	Arthur and George	Miss Jean Leckie	TV series
2016	My Mother and Other Strangers	Rose Coyne	TV series
2016	Alice Through the Looking Glass	Queen Elsemere	Feature film
2017	Beauty and the Beast	Agathe/Enchantress, Narrator	Feature film
2018	Inside No. 9	Amber	Series 4, episode 1: "Zanzibar"
2019	The Sleepers (Bez vědomí)	Susanne Clayton	
2019	Official Secrets	Yvonne Ridley	
2020	Enola Holmes	Lady Tewkesbury	Netflix Feature Film
2022	Operation Mincemeat	Iris Montagu	Feature Film
2023	Luther: The Fallen Sun	Corinne Aldrich	Netflix Feature Film
2023	Hijack	British Foreign Minister	Apple TV+ Original
2024	Fool Me Once	Caroline Burkett	Netflix miniseries
2025	The Gilded Age	Lady Sarah Vere	Season 3
2026	Enola Holmes 3	Lady Tewkesbury	Netflix Feature Film

=== Theatre ===
Year	Title	Role	Notes
2001	Love in a Wood	Lucy	RSC Swan Theatre
2001	Hamlet	Gentlewoman player	RSC Stratford and Barbican
2001	The Prisoner's Dilemma	Emilia	RSC The Other Place and The Pit, Barbican
2002	Night of the Soul	Tracy	RSC The Pit, Barbican
2002	The Circle	Elizabeth	UK tour
2003	Arsenic and Old Lace	Elaine	Strand Theatre, 25 February – 31 May
2003	Power	Louise de la Valliere	Cottesloe Theatre, 3 July – 29 October
2004	Singer	Ruby	Oxford Stage Company, UK tour
2004	Euripides' Iphigenia at Aulis	Iphigenia	Lyttelton Theatre, 22 June – 7 September
2005	Twelfth Night	Viola	West Yorkshire Playhouse, 21 September – 22 October
2006	See How They Run	Penelope Toop	UK tour
2006	The Seagull	Nina	Olivier Theatre, 27 June – 23 September
2008	The City by Martin Crimp	Clair	Royal Court Theatre, 24 April – 7 June
2008	...some trace of her	Nastasya	Cottesloe (National) Theatre; 23 July – 21 October
2008–2009	The Family Reunion	Mary	Donmar Warehouse, 25 November 2008 – 10 January 2009
2009	Time and the Conways	Kate Conway	National Theatre Lyttelton; 28 April – 27 July
2010	The Real Thing	Annie	Old Vic; 10 April – 5 June
2011	Plenty	Susan Traherne	Crucible Theatre Studio, Sheffield; 8–26 February
2012	A Doll's House	Nora Helmer	Young Vic; 29 June – 26 July
2012	The Dark Earth and the Night Sky	Helen Thomas	Almeida Theatre; November - January
2017	Anatomy of a Suicide	Carol	Royal Court Theatre, 3 June – 8 July
2019	Grief Is The Thing With Feathers	Mother	Barbican Centre; 25 March - 13 April
2019	Orpheus Descending	Lady Torrance	Menier Chocolate Factory; May - July
2023	Ghosts	Helene Alving	Sam Wanamaker Playhouse; November - January

=== Radio ===
Year	Title	Role	Notes
2006	Trevor's World of Sport	Carrie	Guest star
2010–2011	I, Claudius	Agrippina the Elder	BBC Radio 4; 28 November 2010 – 2 January 2011
2010	The Art of Deception	Jessica Brown	BBC Radio 4; 20–24 December 2010
2012	Miss MacKenzie	Miss MacKenzie	BBC Radio 4 Extra
2012	A Month in the Country	Alice Keach	adapted by Dave Sheasby from JL Carr's novella: BBC Radio 4 Saturday Drama series
2013	Welcome to Our Village, Please Invade Carefully	Katrina Lyons	BBC Radio 2
2015–2017	Doctor Who: Doom Coalition	Helen Sinclair	Big Finish Productions
2018	Tracks – Chimera	Dr. Helen Ash	BBC Radio 4
2018–2019	Doctor Who: Ravenous	Helen Sinclair	Big Finish Productions
2020–2022	Doctor Who: Stranded	Helen Sinclair	Big Finish Productions
2022	Doctor Who: The Eighth Doctor Adventures: What lies inside?	Helen Sinclair	Big Finish Productions
2022	Doctor Who: The Eighth Doctor Adventures: Connections	Helen Sinclair	Big Finish Productions
2023	Enduring Love	Clarissa	BBC Radio 4
