= Racial Adjustment Action Society =

The Racial Adjustment Action Society (or Raas, which in Jamaican connotes buttocks or arse) was a Black Power movement formed in 1965, following visits of Malcolm X in 1964 and 1965. Its founders were Michael de Freitas (Abdul Malik) who had emigrated to London in 1957 from Trinidad and had renamed himself Michael X, and Roy Sawh. It has been described as the forerunning Black Power organisation in Britain of the time. RAAS was considered to be 'stridently militant', and in 1967 Michael X was jailed for incitement to racial hatred. Roy Sawh was also jailed for incitement to racial hatred.

== The Black House ==
Early in 1969 RAAS bought premises at 95–101 Holloway Road for use as a cultural centre, shopping complex, hostel and headquarters, to be called "The Black House". On 15 January 1970 it was damaged by a fire. The police suspected that the fire had been the result of arson (which Michael X asserted was untrue), and in April 1970, Michael X and seven other RAAS members were arrested after allegations by businessman Mervin Brown that he had been robbed and assaulted. In autumn 1970 the Black House was closed down following a police raid, and RAAS fragmented.

== Other related groups ==
Other related groups included the Co-ordinating Committee Against Racial Discrimination (CCARD) in Birmingham, the Indian Workers Association, the Movement for Colonial Freedom and the Indian Youth League, the Conference of Afro-Asian-Caribbean Organisations (CAACO) in London (the latter founded by Claudia Jones in 1962) and the Universal Coloured People's Association, formed by Obi Egbuna in 1967.
