= Michael X =

Civil rights activist and convicted murderer (1933–1975)

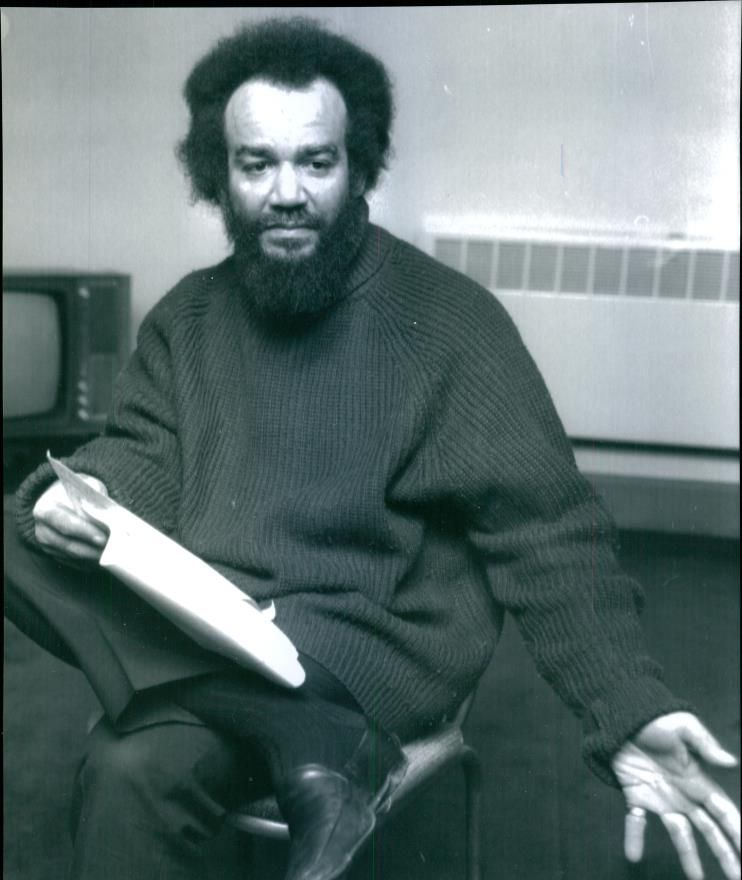
- Michael X in 1970
- Born: Michael de Freitas; 17 August 1933; Belmont, Port of Spain, Trinidad and Tobago
- Died: 16 May 1975 (aged 41); Port of Spain Royal Gaol, Trinidad and Tobago
- Other names: Michael Abdul Malik; Abdul Malik
- Occupation: Activist
- Movement: Black Power Movement
- Status: Executed by hanging
- Conviction: Murder
- Penalty: Death

Michael X (17 August 1933 – 16 May 1975), born Michael de Freitas, was a Trinidad and Tobago-born self-styled Black revolutionary, convicted murderer, and civil rights activist in 1960s London. He was also known as Michael Abdul Malik and Abdul Malik. Convicted of murder in 1972, Michael X was executed by hanging in 1975 in Port of Spain's Royal Gaol.

== Biography ==
Michael de Freitas was born in Belmont, Port of Spain, Trinidad and Tobago, to an "Obeah-practising black woman from Barbados and an absent Portuguese father from St Kitts". Encouraged by his mother to pass for white, "Red Mike" was a headstrong youth and was expelled from school at the age of 14. In 1957, he emigrated to the United Kingdom, where he settled in London and worked as an enforcer and frontman for Peter Rachman, the notorious slumlord. He professed to dislike the role, but it paid for his lifestyle. He became involved in the radical politics and groups active in and around Notting Hill.

By the mid-1960s, taking a cue from Malcolm X, he had become known as Michael X. "Michael X" became a well-known exponent of Black Power in London. Writing in The Observer in 1965, Colin McGlashan called him the "authentic voice of black bitterness."

In 1965, under the name Abdul Malik, he founded the Racial Adjustment Action Society (RAAS).

In 1967, he was involved with the counterculture/hippie organisation the London Free School (LFS) through his contact with John "Hoppy" Hopkins, which both helped widen the reach of the group, at least in the Notting Hill area, and create problems with local police who disliked his involvement. Michael and the LFS were instrumental in organising the first outdoor Notting Hill Carnival later that year.

In 1967, he became the first non-white person to be charged and imprisoned under the UK's Race Relations Act, which was designed to protect Britain's Black and Asian populations from discrimination. He was sentenced to 12 months in prison, having been arrested on the accusation of using words likely to stir up hatred "against a section of the public in Great Britain distinguished by colour". He was charged with violating the Race Relations Act was after a speech in Reading in which he said, referring to the Notting Hill race riots: "In 1958, I saw white savages kicking black women in the streets and black brothers running away. If you ever see a white laying hands on a black woman, kill him immediately." He also said "white men have no soul".

In 1969, he became the self-appointed leader of a Black Power commune on Holloway Road, North London, called the "Black House". The commune was financed by a young millionaire benefactor, Nigel Samuel. Michael X said, "They've made me the archbishop of violence in this country. But that 'get a gun' rhetoric is over. We're talking of really building things in the community needed by people in the community. We're keeping a sane approach." John Lennon and Yoko Ono donated a bag of their hair to be auctioned for the benefit of the Black House.

In what the media called "the slave collar affair", businessman Marvin Brown was enticed to The Black House, viciously attacked, and made to wear a spiked "slave collar" around his neck as Michael X and others threatened him in order to extort money. The Black House closed in the autumn of 1970. The two men found guilty of assaulting Marvin Brown were imprisoned for 18 months.

The Black House burned down in mysterious circumstances, and soon Michael X and four colleagues were arrested for extortion. His bail was paid by Lennon in January 1971.

In February 1971, Michael X fled to his native Trinidad and Tobago, where he started an agricultural commune devoted to Black empowerment 16 miles (26 km) east of the capital, Port of Spain. "The only politics I ever understand is the politics of revolution," he told the Trinidad Express. "The politics of change, the politics of a completely new system." He began another commune, also called the Black House, which, in February 1972, also burned down.

== Murder trial ==
Police who had come to the commune to investigate the fire discovered the bodies of Joseph Skerritt and Gale Benson, members of the commune. They had been hacked to death and buried in shallow graves. Benson, who had been going under the name Hale Kimga, was the daughter of Conservative MP Leonard F. Plugge. She had met Michael X through her relationship with his associate Hakim Jamal.

At the time of the discovery, Michael X and his family were in Guyana by invitation of the Guyanese Prime Minister Forbes Burnham. He was then captured in Guyana and charged with the murder of Skerritt and Benson, but was never tried for the latter crime. The trial was held in Trinidad; it was alleged that the killings were carried out by his followers Stanley Abbott and Edward Chadee. A witness at his trial said that Skerritt was a member of Michael X's "Black Liberation Army" and had been killed by him because he refused to obey orders to attack a local police station. Michael X was found guilty and sentenced to death.

The Save Malik Committee, whose members included Angela Davis, Dick Gregory, Kate Millett and others, including the well-known, self-described "radical lawyer" William Kunstler, who was paid by Lennon, pleaded for clemency, but Michael X was hanged in 1975. Abbott was hanged for the murder of Benson in 1979, while Chadee's death sentence was reduced to life in prison.

== Legacy ==
Under the name Michael Abdul Malik, Michael X was the author of the autobiography From Michael de Freitas to Michael X (André Deutsch, 1968), which was ghost-written by John Stevenson. Michael X also left behind fragments of a novel about a romantic black hero who wins the abject admiration of the narrator, a young woman named Lena Boyd-Richardson. The novel was never completed.

== Cultural references ==
Michael X is the subject of the essay "Michael X and the Black Power Killings in Trinidad" by V. S. Naipaul, collected in The Return of Eva Perón and the Killings in Trinidad (1980), and is also believed to be the model for the fictional character Jimmy Ahmed in Naipaul's 1975 novel Guerrillas.

Michael X is a character in The Bank Job (2008), a dramatisation of a real-life bank robbery in 1971. The film claims that Michael X was in possession of indecent photographs of Princess Margaret and used them to avoid criminal prosecution by threatening to publish them; according to the movie plot, X killed Gale Benson because she was a British Secret Services agent and revealed where he kept the blackmail material. He was played by Peter de Jersey.

Michael X and his trial are the subject of a chapter in Geoffrey Robertson's legal memoir The Justice Game (1998).

Documentary film, Who Needs a Heart (1991), is inspired by Michael X. John Akomfrah is the director.

Michael X plays a part in Make Believe: A True Story (1993), a memoir by Diana Athill.

Michael X is the eponymous title of a play, by the writer Vanessa Walters, that takes the form of a 1960s Black Power rally and was performed at The Tabernacle Theatre, Powis Square, London W11 (Notting Hill), in November 2008.

Michael X (played by Adrian Lester) is portrayed in a scene opposite Jimi Hendrix in the 2013 film All Is By My Side, based on Hendrix's early years in the music industry.

In 1966, Muhammad Ali gave his bloodied boxing shorts that he wore when he fought Henry Cooper to Michael Abdul Malik, who is referred to as a black militant from Trinidad in The Greatest: My Own Story (1975) by Muhammad Ali with Richard Durham.

Michael X is a subject in the 2021 Adam Curtis documentary series Can't Get You Out of My Head.

== See also ==
- 1990 African Islamist coup attempt in Trinidad
