= Peter de Jersey =

British actor

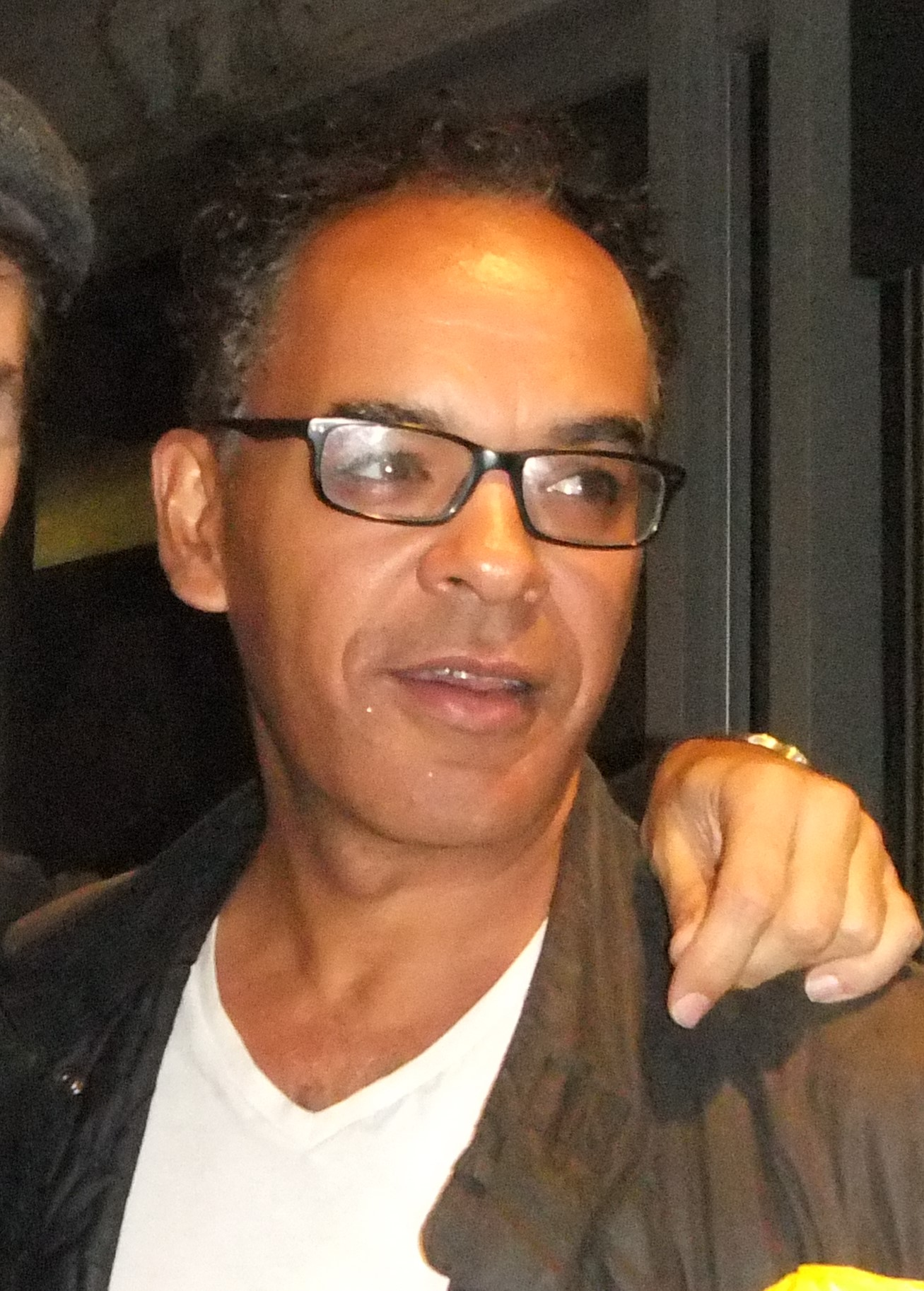
- de Jersey in 2016
- Born: 1965 (age 60–61); Southwark, London, England
- Education: Central School of Speech and Drama
- Occupation: Actor
- Years active: 1995–present

Peter de Jersey (born 1965) is a British actor. He has played roles in television, including the long-time recurring role of "Jerome Taylor" in The Bill, and roles in Broadchurch and Warrior Nun.

== Career ==
From 2000 to 2003, de Jersey played Steve Waring in Holby City, until the character was involved in a car crash and subsequently died in hospital. Other television appearances include Doctors and Dalziel and Pascoe. In the New Tricks episode "Father's Pride", he appeared alongside fellow Holby City actor Jeremy Sheffield. He played Frances Tomelty’s murdered husband in a 2020 episode of Death in Paradise.

He appeared with the Royal Shakespeare Company in 2008–09, where his parts included Orlando to Samantha Bond's Rosalind, Horatio to David Tennant's Hamlet, and Oberon in A Midsummer Night's Dream. Having performed with the National Theatre in Helen Edmundson's adaptation of Leo Tolstoy's War and Peace, de Jersey was praised highly for his portrayal of Antiochus in Believe In What You Will. He also acted in Rough Crossings, the theatre adaptation by Caryl Phillips from Simon Schama's book.

His work involves a supporting role in the 2008 film The Bank Job, in which he portrayed Michael X, and playing the general Cominius in the Donmar Warehouse's 2013–14 production of Coriolanus. Peter de Jersey played Gooper in Tennessee Williams´ Cat on a Hot Tin Roof at the Novello Theatre, London, performing alongside James Earl Jones, Phylicia Rashad and Adrian Lester.

Peter de Jersey played Androgar in the Doctor Who 50th Anniversary episode "The Day of the Doctor" broadcast on 23 November 2013.

In 2023, de Jersey starred as Voltaire in The Score at the Theatre Royal, Bath. In May 2024, de Jersey starred as Vet in The Book of Grace, staged at the Arcola Theatre.
