= Zayats =

Zayats (Ukrainian: За́яць, Russian: Заяц, Belarusian: Заяц, meaning "hare") is a gender-neutral East Slavic surname. Notable people with the surname include

- Anatoly Zayats (born 1963), Ukrainian-British experimental physicist
- Elena Zaiatz or Zayats (born 1969), Belarusian-Russian chess player
- Mikhail Zayats (born 1981), Russian mixed martial artist
- Yaroslav Zayats (born 1960), Soviet and Ukrainian footballer
- Vadym Zayats (born 1974), Ukrainian footballer
- Igor Zayats (born 1999), Belarusian footballer

== See also ==
- Zayat (surname)
