= Waguih Ghali =

Egyptian writer

Waguih Ghali (25 February 1927/1928/1929 – 5 January 1969) was an Egyptian writer, best known for his novel Beer in the Snooker Club (André Deutsch, 1964). Fearing political persecution, Ghali spent his adult years impoverished, living in exile in Europe. He died on 5 January 1969, after a fatal overdose of sleeping pills taken 10 days before.

== Biography ==
Waguih Ghali was born in Alexandria, Egypt to a Coptic family. According to Ghali's friend and editor, Diana Athill, Ghali carefully obscured details about his past. Ghali's diary confirms his birthdate (25 February), but not his birth year. He was probably born between 1927 and 1929. When he was young, his father died, and his mother (née Ibrahim) remarried. In his diary Ghali writes about his family's financial struggles. Homeless, he shuttled among friends and relatives in both Alexandria and Cairo. Yet, members of his extended family were wealthy and influential, and there are details of a life of privilege in his writings as well.

Ghali attended Victoria College, variously at the Alexandria and Cairo campuses, from 1944 to 1947. He studied in the Faculty of Medicine at Cairo University, and was present when the students staged a demonstration on 4 December 1948 that left the police chief, Selim Zaki, dead. Ghali started but did not complete medical studies in at the Sorbonne in Paris. He left Paris in 1953. He also lived in London in the mid-1950s.

One report suggests that he left Egypt for good in 1958. However, personal narrative essays he published in The Guardian (Manchester) between 1957 and 1959 about life in exile suggest that Ghali was already living in Europe by that time. After living in Stockholm, Ghali moved to West Germany in 1960. According to Athill he picked up whatever work he could find, including at the docks in Hamburg, as a labourer in factories, and as a clerk. From 1964 until 1966, he was employed by the British Army Royal Pay Corps in Rheydt, West Germany. In May 1966 Ghali returned to London, where he continued to pick up odd jobs.

On 26 December 1968, Ghali swallowed a bottle of sleeping pills in Diana Athill's apartment. He died on 5 January 1969. Athill published a fictionalized account of her relationship with Ghali entitled After a Funeral (1986).

== Writings ==
=== Essays in The Manchester Guardian ===
Between 1957 and 1959 Ghali published six short personal narrative essays in The Manchester Guardian (renamed The Guardian in 1959). These essays are Ghali's first known published works. The first article, “My Friend Kamal,” recounts Ghali's political activism in Cairo in the late 1940s. This piece reappears in fictionalized form in Beer in the Snooker Club. The remaining essays, along with another piece also published in The Guardian in 1965, recount his experiences living in exile in Europe: “My Friend Kamal,” 5 Jun 1957; “Lessons for Mr. Luigi,” 21 Apr 1958; “Culture for Daimler,” 24 Nov 1958; “The Writers,” 29 Jan 1959; “An Indian Courier,” 16 March 1959; “Captains of My Ship,” 12 Nov 1959; “The Roses are Real,” 20 Feb 1965.

=== Beer in the Snooker Club ===
Ghali began composing the novel Beer in the Snooker Club while living in Stockholm and he completed it in West Germany. The novel was first published by Andre Deutsch in London in 1964. It was reprinted by Penguin in 1968 and by Serpent's Tail in 1987 and 2010. Beer in the Snooker Club has been translated into French, Hebrew, Dutch, Arabic, Italian, and Spanish.

Beer in the Snooker Club is about a young Copt named Ram, who, like the author, has little money, but has benefited from a life of privilege. A politically savvy novel set in the 1950s, the narrative critiques both the British colonial enterprise and the regime of Gamal Abdel Nasser. Ram and his equally impoverished Coptic friend Font meet and befriend a Jewish communist from a wealthy family named Edna. At the time, the two boys were students at the university and involved in demonstrations against the continued British presence in the Suez Canal Zone. A romance develops between Ram, a Coptic Christian, and Edna, an Egyptian Jew. Edna encourages Ram and Font to round out their education, and helps support sending them to London. Ram and Font's visit to London is cut short by the 1956 Suez Crisis. Upon his return to Cairo, Ram is struck by the brutality of the Nasser regime.

The novel portrays two societies in transition. Following the 1956 Suez Crisis, Egypt's foreign minority communities began leaving, and the cosmopolitan character of Egypt's cities began to wane. The Suez Crisis also signaled the end of Great Britain's reign as a colonial power. Beer in the Snooker Club captures both of these transitions.

=== The Diaries of Waguih Ghali: An Egyptian in the Swinging Sixties, ed. May Hawas ===
Ghali's handwritten diaries were transcribed, edited and published in 2016 and 2017 in two volumes. The Diaries cover the last few years of his life. Ghali spent much of the period between 1964 and 1968 working for the British Army corps in the small town of Rheydt (Mönchengladbach), West Germany. He often feels suffocated in the town but writes that Germany was one of the only places which had given him refuge. He often dreams of moving to London, where he feels there is much more intellectual and economic opportunity for him. He finally moves there in 1966, to live in the house (and on the resources) of his friend, editor and occasionally lover, Diana Athill. From there, Ghali describes his turbulent life with Athill and his unabating struggles with alcohol dependency and depression, even as he shares insights about and sharp critique of the intellectual life in 1960s London. The Diaries also include a blow by blow account of his visit to Israel a few days after the 1967 War, the reasons that pushed him to go, and the people he met. A little before his painful suicide note, he describes the moment in which he found out that he had been stripped of his Egyptian passport. The Diaries include a preface, and interviews with Athill and one of Ghali's relatives.

=== Unpublished writings ===
Ghali was at work on a second novel when he died on 5 January 1969. In his diary, Ghali referred to the work in progress as the “Ashl novel.” Upon his death, he left behind fragments of this unfinished novel as well as six notebooks of diaries. Cornell University Library has digitized this archive of unpublished work.

== Critical reception of Beer in the Snooker Club ==
Ahdaf Soueif wrote that “Waguih Ghali’s excellent novel Beer in the Snooker Club was published by André Deutsch in 1964. It attracted attention and enthusiastic reviews. The same happened when it was reissued in the Penguin New Writers Series in 1968.” The novel was positively reviewed in both The Times and The New York Times, as well as in The Guardian, the New Statesman, The Times Literary Supplement, and The New Yorker, and elsewhere. In his contemporaneous review of the novel Martin Levin calls the book “a small masterpiece of a novel that does several things with astonishing virtuosity. It gives an Egyptian’s view of Nasser’s Egypt that brilliantly communicates the texture of this experience. It depicts political conflicts before and after Suez in terms of imagery that transcend journalistic platitudes. And it creates an original and complex protagonist.”

Two years prior to the third reissue of Beer in the Snooker Club, in a letter to the editors of the London Review of Books, novelist Gabriel Josipovici wrote, “Beer in the Snooker Club is the best book ever written about Egypt (better even than my grandfather’s Goha le Simple) and it is a crying shame that it is out of print.”

Each subsequent reissue generated additional positive reviews, attesting to the continued importance of the novel.

The novel was cited in some cultural analyses following the overthrow of President Hosni Mubarak in February 2011. Helen Stuhr-Rommereim wrote that the novel's “themes echo a similar discourse that fills Cairo today.” Negar Azimi also wrote that Beer in the Snooker Club “presents uncanny parallels to today’s Egypt, where artists, intellectuals and youth at large are beginning to fashion a new cultural republic of sorts even as they also struggle to find their bearings.”

== Travel to Israel ==
Following the 1967 Arab–Israeli war, Ghali visited Israel as a freelance journalist. During his stay, which lasted for six weeks from July through September 1967, he filed two articles for The Times. In December 1967, he recorded a longer reflection on his visit for the BBC, the transcript of which was published in January 1968.

Ghali had already been denied renewal of his Egyptian passport, so he had little to lose politically by visiting the state with which his native country had recently been at war. Personally, however, he suffered from the criticism he received from fellow Egyptians.
