= The Bank Job =

2008 film by Roger Donaldson

- Theatrical release poster
- Directed by: Roger Donaldson
- Written by: Dick Clement; Ian La Frenais
- Produced by: Charles Roven; Steven Chasman
- Starring: Jason Statham
- Cinematography: Michael Coulter
- Edited by: John Gilbert
- Music by: J. Peter Robinson
- Production companies: Mosaic Media Group; Relativity Media LLC; Skyline (Baker St.) Productions
- Distributed by: Lionsgate (United States and United Kingdom); Paramount Pictures (Australia)
- Release dates: 19 February 2008 (Glasgow Film Festival); 29 February 2008 (UK)
- Running time: 112 minutes
- Countries: United States; United Kingdom; Australia
- Language: English
- Budget: $20 million
- Box office: $66.1 million

The Bank Job is a 2008 heist thriller film directed by Roger Donaldson and written by Dick Clement and Ian La Frenais. It is based on the 1971 burglary of Lloyds Bank safety deposit boxes in Baker Street. It stars Jason Statham.

The producers allege that the story was prevented from being told in 1971 because of a D-Notice, to protect Princess Margaret, a prominent member of the British royal family. According to the producers, this film is intended to reveal the truth for the first time, although it apparently includes significant elements of fiction.

The premiere was held in London on 18 February 2008, and it was released in the UK on 29 February 2008 and in the US on 7 March 2008. It received mostly positive reviews from critics and grossed $66 million worldwide.

== Plot ==
In 1971, British Security Services (MI5) want a safety deposit box secured in a Lloyds Bank branch. Belonging to Black militant gangster Michael X, it contains compromising photos of Princess Margaret, insurance to keep the British authorities off Michael's back. Martine, an ex-model sleeping with MI5 agent Tim Everett, is caught smuggling drugs into the country; to avoid going to jail, she makes a deal with Tim to retrieve the photos so MI5 can finally arrest Michael.

MI5 has the idea to stage the retrieval as a robbery so Martine approaches her ex-boyfriend Terry Leather, who has criminal contacts. Terry is now a struggling car salesman but happily married with two kids. She tells him he will be richly rewarded if they pull off the robbery but does not tell him about the photos. Terry's team includes his close friends Eddie, Dave, and Kevin, as well as trusted criminal associates Bambas and Guy. While scouting the bank, Dave runs into gangster Lew Vogel, for whom he'd made pornographic films.

The gang rents a shop near the bank, tunnels below the vault, and breaks in. During the robbery prep, Martine, who is still in love with Terry, kisses him and they sleep together. They loot the safety deposit boxes, but Terry discovers Princess Margaret's photos and learns that Martine lied to them. The police are alerted to the robbery by ham radio operator Eric Addey, who overhears the gang's walkie-talkie communications, but the gang has fled. The robbery rattles important figures who kept incriminating items, including Vogel, who has a ledger of police payoffs and bribes inside, and Incriminating photographs of government officials who secretly frequented Sonia Bern's brothels. Vogel realizes Dave's presence outside the bank was not a coincidence, and has him kidnapped and tortured for information. Dave gives in, and Vogel has Gerald and Nick—two policemen on his payroll—kidnap Eddie. Terry discovers the explicit photographs of government officials in Sonia's brothels among their loot. Knowing Tim will let the gang take the fall once MI5 has Princess Margaret's photos, Terry uses the brothel photos to secure passports and new identities for the gang in exchange for Princess Margaret's photos.

Vogel's men murder Bambas and Guy. Vogel kills Dave and threatens to kill Eddie unless Terry surrenders the ledger. Terry agrees to meet with Vogel at Paddington Station to exchange the ledger for Eddie. He arranges for the meeting to happen at the same time he will be picking up the new passports and written immunity from prosecution from MI5, delivered by Lord Mountbatten. Terry also sends Kevin to honest straight cop Roy Given with a page from the ledger to ask for his help. Vogel tries to flee at the sight of MI5, but Terry attacks him—only for him and Eddie to be arrested. Tim has Terry, Eddie and Kevin released and Given uses the ledger they turned in to arrest Vogel, Gerald and Nick. Michael deduces that Gale Benson—an MI5 agent and lover of his associate Hakim Jamal—is spying on him for MI5, and murders her. With Princess Margaret's photos secured, Tim arrests Michael and discovers Gale's body, with whom he was friends. He burns down Michael's house in response. The surviving gang gets together one last time to mourn Dave. Terry hands over his car dealership to Eddie. Martine asks Terry to leave with her but he refuses, choosing his wife and kids. Terry and his family leave England with their share of the money.

Vogel's ledger causes Scotland Yard to undergo a major corruption purge in the police force. The activities in Sonia's brothels make several senior officials resign. Michael X is hanged in 1975 for Gale's murder and his file in the British National Archive remains classified until 2054. Vogel is sentenced to 8 years in prison. The murders of Bambas and Singer are never solved. The loot taken from the robbery consists of £4 million which was never recovered..

== Cast ==
- Jason Statham as Terry Leather
- Saffron Burrows as Martine Love
- Richard Lintern as Tim Everett
- Stephen Campbell Moore as Kevin Swain
- Daniel Mays as Dave Shilling
- Peter Bowles as MI5 Executive Director Miles Urquhart
- Keeley Hawes as Wendy Leather
- Colin Salmon as Hakim Jamal
- Peter de Jersey as Michael Abdul Malik/Michael X
- James Faulkner as "Major" Guy Arthur Singer
- Sharon Maughan as Sonia Bern
- Don Gallagher as Det. Con. Gerald Pyke
- Gerard Horan as Det. Sgt. Roy Given
- Craig Fairbrass as Det. Con. Nick Barton
- Alistair Petrie as Philip Lisle
- David Suchet as Lew Vogel
- Michael Jibson as Eddie Burton
- Georgia Taylor as Ingrid Burton
- Alki David as Bambas
- Hattie Morahan as Gale Benson
- Julian Lewis Jones as Agent Snow
- Andrew Brooke as Agent Quinn
- Rupert Frazer as Lord Drysdale
- Christopher Owen as Lord Mountbatten
- Taelor Samways as Catherine Leather
- Kasey Baterip as Julie Leather
- Robert Whitelock as Alfie Hook
- Jamie Kenna as Perky
- Angus Wright as Eric Addey
- Mark Phoenix as Mr. Brown
- Julian Firth as Lawyer
- Rupert Vansittart as Sir Leonard Plugge
- Bronson Webb as Waiter
- Ursula Mohan as Mrs. Leather
- Alan Swofford as John Lennon
- Louise Chambers as Princess Margaret
- The Storys as Wedding Band
- Trevor Coppola as Leonard (uncredited)
- Mick Jagger as Bank Employee (uncredited)

== Historical background ==
The film is in part based on historical facts about the Baker Street robbery. A gang tunnelled into a branch of Lloyds Bank at the junction of Baker Street and Marylebone Road in London on the night of 11 September 1971 and robbed the safety deposit boxes that were stored in the vault. The robbers had rented a leather goods shop named Le Sac two doors down from the bank, and tunnelled approximately 40 feet (12 metres), passing under the Chicken Inn restaurant that was located between the shop and the bank. The tunnelling took three weeks, working on weekends.

Ham radio operator Robert Rowlands overheard conversations between the robbers and their rooftop lookout. He contacted police and tape-recorded the conversations, which were subsequently made public. The film includes lines recorded by Rowlands, such as the lookout's comment that "money may be your god, but it's not mine, and I'm fucking off."

The film's producers said that they have a source, identified in press reports as George McIndoe, who was an executive producer. McIndoe claimed that he had talked with two of the gang, who even visited the film set. The film's plot includes a fictional issue of a D-Notice by MI5, requesting no further press reports on grounds of national security because of a safe deposit box holding sexually compromising pictures of Princess Margaret. The possible connection to Michael X is based on material from McIndoe, who said he had spoken to two men who claimed they were involved robbers. The Daily Mirror interviewed a convicted robber who claims to be a perpetrator, and he indicated that embarrassing photos were found but deliberately left behind for the police, including child pornography. The film-makers acknowledged that they made up the character Martine Love (Saffron Burrows). David Denby wrote in The New Yorker that it is "impossible to say how much of the film's story is true".

The fictional character of Lew Vogel (David Suchet) may allude to pornographer and racketeer Bernie Silver, a major figure in Soho in the 1960s and early 1970s who was imprisoned in 1975 for the 1956 murder of Tommy "Scarface" Smithson, and also to later events surrounding his associate pornographer James Humphreys. The Sunday People published photographs in 1972 of Commander Kenneth Drury, the head of the Metropolitan Police Flying Squad, spending a luxurious two-week holiday with Humphreys in Cyprus, and a police raid on Humphreys' house uncovered a diary cataloguing itemised payments to 17 police officers. Humphreys was imprisoned for eight years in 1974 for wounding his wife Rusty's former lover. He then turned Queen's Evidence, testifying against some of Scotland Yard's most senior officers in two major corruption trials in 1977, for which he received a Royal Pardon and was released from prison. In 1994, Humphreys was imprisoned for 12 months for living off the earnings of prostitutes.

The introduction of Michael X (Peter de Jersey)'s character showing him leading landlord Mr. Brown (Mark Phoenix) locked in a slave collar is based on a historical incident. A passing glance at a photo of John Lennon (Alan Swofford) found in Michael X's safety deposit box is inspired by Lennon's support for Michael X's "Black House" headquarters depicted in the film, and Lennon posting his bail.

== Production ==
Screenshot illustrating how a special outdoor set was constructed for production of the film.

Part of the filming took place on location at the offices of Websters, 136 Baker Street, where the rooftops were used for lookout locations. The exterior scenes of the bank and adjacent shops were done at Pinewood Studios on a specially constructed set of Baker Street, to retain an authentic feel of the period and to allow for greater control. This partial set was extended using visual effects.

The production also shot on location inside the Aldwych Underground station, and at Paddington station. The crew used Chatham Historic Dockyard to shoot the sequence at the side entrance of Paddington, where the final showdown between Terry and Lew Vogel takes place.

== Reception ==
=== Box office ===
The Bank Job grossed $30.1 million in the United States and Canada, as well as $36.1 million in other territories (including $8.1 million in the UK), for a worldwide total of $66.1 million.

The film opened at No. 4 in North America and grossed US$5.9 million in 1,603 cinemas in its opening weekend.

=== Critical response ===
The review aggregator Rotten Tomatoes reports that 79% of 144 critics gave the film a positive review, with an average rating of 6.8/10. The website's critics consensus reads: "Well cast and crisply directed, The Bank Job is a thoroughly entertaining British heist thriller." Metacritic reports the film has a weighted average score of 69 out of 100 based on 32 critics, indicating "generally favorable reviews". Audiences polled by CinemaScore graded the film an average "B+" on an A+ to F scale.
