= Maxwell Staniforth =

British soldier, railwayman, clergyman and scholar (1893–1985)

John Hamilton Maxwell Staniforth (23 June 1893 – 26 December 1985), known to his family as Max, was a British soldier, railwayman, radio presenter, clergyman and scholar.

== Early life and education ==
Staniforth born in Hinderwell, Yorkshire, on 23 June 1893 to John William Staniforth and Mary Jane Dobbin Maxwell. He was named after his maternal great-grandfather, the writer William Hamilton Maxwell. He was educated at Charterhouse and Christ Church, Oxford, where he held a classical scholarship. His intended academic career was foiled by the onset of World War I.

== Military service ==
Staniforth served as an infantry officer with the Prince of Wales's Leinster Regiment (Royal Canadians) of the 16th Irish Division on the Western Front from 1914-1918. He was awarded the 1914-15 Star, the British War Medal, and the British Victory Medal. Following his service, he married Ruby Di Stephens in 1922.

== Railways ==
Staniforth became a railwayman on the British railways in Argentina, rising to the rank of Assistant Traffic Manager. During his time in Argentina he had a daughter, Rosamund Ann Staniforth, on 4 April 1928; she would go on to marry Charles Edward Byron Du Cane, son of Charles Henry Copley Du Cane, and grandson of Charles Du Cane.

== Radio presenter ==
Staniforth returned from Argentina, and became the first full-time presenter for Radio Normandy (a commercial English-language service) in 1931. In November 1932 he transferred to Radio Toulouse before taking up a position at the International Broadcasting Company headquarters in London. He then left radio to enter the church.

== Clerical life ==
Staniforth took Holy Orders, and spent twenty five years as a parish priest. He was vicar of the Dorset villages of Pentridge and Sixpenny Handley from 1952 to 1963. He retired as Rural Dean of Blandford, in Dorset.

== Translation ==
Staniforth translated Marcus Aurelieus' Meditations for Penguin Classics, and later worked on their Early Christian Writings.
