= Gale Benson =

British model (1944–1972)

- Born: Gale Ann Mildred Plugge; 4 November 1944; London, England
- Died: 2 January 1972 (aged 27); Arima, Trinidad and Tobago
- Other name: Hale Kimga
- Occupations: Model; socialite
- Known for: Victim of murder
- Spouse: Jonathan Benson (m. 1964; div. 1970)
- Partner: Hakim Jamal (1970–1972)
- Parents: Leonard Plugge (father); Ann Plugge (née Muckleston) (mother)

Gale Ann Mildred Benson (née Plugge; 4 November 1944 – 2 January 1972), later known as Hale Kimga, was a British model, socialite and daughter of politician Leonard Plugge. She was a supporter of the black power movement through her relationship with the activist Hakim Jamal. Benson was stabbed and buried alive by associates of Michael X while she attended his compound in Trinidad and Tobago.

== Life ==
Benson was born on 4 November 1944 in Middlesex Hospital, London, alongside her twin brother Greville. Her father, Leonard Plugge, was a millionaire, scientist and Conservative MP. Benson once worked as a model.

On 12 December 1964, Benson married Jonathan Benson. The actor Corin Redgrave was their best man. Her husband was a socialite film director and Benson developed a social conscience through interactions with his acquaintances. Benson maintained friendships with film stars, business tycoons and international celebrities.

Benson met Michael X and developed an infatuation with him. She changed her clothing style from expensive frocks to scruffy jeans and attended black power demonstrations. Benson provided secretarial and organisational assistance to Michael X in addition to helping him establish connections through her social network. Jonathan described Benson's actions as "rebelling against her totally conformist English background." Benson and her husband divorced in 1970.

Benson was eventually spurned by Michael X once she no longer had any use to him. She met Hakim Jamal through their mutual connection with Redgrave. Benson was lonely and depressed at the time; she promptly fell in love with Jamal and subsequently experienced a resurgence of her confidence. She helped to write Jamal's 1971 autobiography From the Dead Level: Malcolm X and Me.

Benson converted to Islam; she adopted the Muslim name Hale Kimga which was an anagram of his and her first names. Benson was considered to be in worship of Jamal; Jamal proclaimed to be a God which was believed by Benson. Benson referred to herself as his handmaiden and said that he "created" her. Their interracial relationship made them the target of threats and insults.

At the end of 1971, Benson and Jamal arrived in Guyana where Jamal sought to establish a publishing house but the government refused to renew his visa. On 9 December, the couple flew to Trinidad and visited the commune Michael X had established earlier that year. Benson and Jamal rented their own residence nearby but made almost nightly visits to the commune.

Benson became a "familiar figure" in Arima where she stood out as one of its few white residents. She was often adorned in an African-style dashiki and walked barefoot.

== Murder ==
Benson is believed to have died on the morning of 2 January 1972. Her death was ordered by Michael X because she was causing "mental strain" to Jamal. She was stabbed at least 10 times after she stepped into a grave that had been dug for her. Benson was also partially strangled but there was evidence that she had been buried alive.

Trina Simmonds was staying on the commune at the time of Benson's death. She recounted that she had a conversation with Jamal that morning where he claimed that Benson had left him and had no awareness of her whereabouts.

On 20 February 1972, Michael X's home was destroyed by fire in a suspected arson attack. Police conducted a search for weapons that they believed to be buried on the grounds of the property. On 22 February, they uncovered the body of 25-year-old local barber Joseph Skerritt. Two days later, police discovered the body of Benson.

Adolphus Parmassar, who was accused of involvement in the murders of Benson and Skerritt, had proceedings dropped against him to testify for the prosecution. Steve Yeates was alleged to have inflicted the final wound to Benson before she was covered in the grave; he allegedly drowned on February 10, 1972, although his body was never discovered. Two men, Stanley Abbott and Edward Chadee, were sentenced to death for their involvement in her murder. They claimed that they acted in fear of Michael X.

In 1977, Abbott lost his last bid to escape the death penalty; he was hanged in 1979. Chadee's death sentence was commuted to life imprisonment. Michael X was charged with Benson's murder but never tried; he was sentenced to death for the murder of Skerritt on 21 August 1972, and hanged in 1975.

In a March 1972 interview with The Daily Telegraph, Jamal said of Benson: "Knowing what Gale has done for black people, I find it hard to believe that any black man would have done her any harm. She was a saint to us, and the black people should see that a statue to her memory is erected in Hyde Park." Jamal was murdered in the United States in 1973, just over a year after Benson's own death.

== Cultural references ==
The movie The Bank Job (2008) portrays Michael X as having been in possession of indecent photographs of Princess Margaret stored in a bank vault, and using them to blackmail the British establishment. Hattie Morahan plays Benson, whom the film portrays as a spy whose role is to find any additional photos or negatives Michael X may have.

Benson is a central character in Diana Athill's memoir of her friendship with Gale's lover, Hakim Jamal, Make Believe: A True Story.
