= Enayat al-Zayyat =

Egyptian writer

- Born: 23 March 1936; Dokki, Egypt
- Died: 5 January 1963 (aged 26)
- Cause of death: Suicide
- Resting place: Cairo, Egypt
- Notable work: Love and Silence

Enayat al-Zayyat (Arabic: عنايات الزيات; 23 March 1936 – 5 January 1963) was an Egyptian writer born in Cairo. She was considered one of Egypt's most prominent women writers who committed suicide. She wrote a single novel that impressed many Egyptian critics and writers, Love and Silence (original: al-Ḥubb wa-al-ṣamt) (1967), which was presented by writer Mustafa Mahmoud.

== Life ==
Her mysterious suicide at a young age and the release of her posthumous novel gave rise to her name in the Arab world at the time. In addition, a film and a radio drama inspired by the novel were also produced. The name Enayat al-Zayyat resurfaced after an absence when the Mahrousa Center For Publishing reprinted her novel in 2019. In November 2019, poet Iman Mersal wrote a book about her, trying to trace her lineage, uncover her biography, and the secret behind her suicide, titled In the Wake of al-Zayyat (original: Fī athar ʻInāyāt al-Zayyāt). The second edition of In the Wake of al-Zayyat was published in January 2020, while the third was published in March 2020.

== Al-Musawar interview ==
The interview published on 16 May 1967 in Al-Musawar magazine titled "Nadia Lutfi Tells the Secret of al-Zayyat's Suicide," is one of the best sources of information available about the author, in which Lutfi points out that al-Zayyat was her early childhood colleague, that she sat next to her at school and found out that she loved painting like she did. In this interview, Lutfi states that they used to study and go to the movies together. Lutfi also points out that al-Zayyat sent her novel Love and Silence to the publishers, who first failed to respond and later rejected the book, claiming it was not fit for publication.

=== Education and marriage ===
She went to school but stopped attending it in 1955. She married Kamal Ben-Shaheen in 1956. Lutfi also points out that al-Zayyat began to have trouble in her married life. After her divorce, al-Zayyat faced a harsh reality and regretted not completing her studies and marriage. According to information available, al-Zayyat had a son, Abbas Shaheen, who graduated from the Faculty of Archaeology, married, and died young, as mentioned in In the Wake of al-Zayyat. Moreover, al-Zayyat had left a speech to her son apologizing to him for her inability to endure a cruel and dark life.

On 18 March 1967, Anis Mansour published "But Her Book was Published Years After Her Death," an article in Al-Qahariya newspaper, in which he referred to her presentation of her literary output of articles, a short story project, and reflections as "humble". In her book, Iman Mersal points out that writer Anis Mansour dedicated most of the article to the presentation of the novel's plot and excerpts, but in the meantime gave scattered information about what he knew about al-Zayyat, including that he gave her his observations on the draft of her novel, which she refused to follow, and that the writer barely knew Arabic and that all her studies were in German.
