= Diana Athill =

British literary editor, novelist and memoirist (1917–2019)

- Born: 21 December 1917; Kensington, London, England
- Died: 23 January 2019 (aged 101); London, England
- Education: Lady Margaret Hall, University of Oxford
- Occupations: Literary editor, author, publisher
- Relatives: Philip Athill (nephew)
- Writing career
- Genres: Novels and memoirs
- Notable works: After a Funeral, Somewhere Towards the End
- Notable awards: OBE, PEN/Ackerley Prize, Costa Book Award, National Book Critics Circle Award
- Diana Athill's voice from the BBC programme Front Row, 26 April 2013.

Diana Athill OBE (21 December 1917 – 23 January 2019) was a British literary editor, novelist and memoirist who worked with some of the greatest writers of the 20th century at the London-based publishing company André Deutsch Ltd.

== Early life ==
Diana Athill was born in Kensington, London, during a World War I Zeppelin bombing raid, daughter of Major Lawrence Francis Imbert Athill (1888–1957) and Alice Katharine (1895–1990), whose father was the biographer William Carr (1862–1925). Diana had a brother, Andrew, and a sister, Patience. Her maternal grandmother was the daughter of James Franck Bright (1832–1920), a Master of University College, Oxford. She was brought up at Ditchingham Hall in Norfolk, a country house owned by her mother's family.

Athill graduated from Lady Margaret Hall, Oxford, in 1939 and worked for the BBC throughout the Second World War.

== Career ==
After the war, Athill helped her friend André Deutsch establish the publishing house Allan Wingate, and five years later, in 1952, she was a founding director of the publishing company that was given his name. She worked closely with many Deutsch authors, including Philip Roth, Norman Mailer, John Updike, Mordecai Richler, Simone de Beauvoir, Jean Rhys, Gitta Sereny, Brian Moore, V. S. Naipaul, Molly Keane, Stevie Smith, Jack Kerouac, Charles Gidley Wheeler, Margaret Atwood, and David Gurr.

Athill retired from Deutsch in 1993 at the age of 75, after more than 50 years in publishing. She continued to influence the literary world through her revealing memoirs about her editorial career.

The first book of her own writing to appear was the short story collection An Unavoidable Delay (1962), and she published two further works of fiction: a novel entitled Don't Look at Me Like That (1967) and in 2011 another volume of stories, Midsummer Night in the Workhouse. She was best known, however, for her books of memoirs, the first of which was Instead of a Letter in 1963. These memoirs were not written in chronological order, Yesterday Morning (2002) being the account of her childhood. She also translated various works from French.

She appeared on Desert Island Discs in 2004, at the age of 86, and selected a recording of Haydn's The Creation as the most valued of the eight records and Thackeray's Vanity Fair as the book.

In June 2010, she was the subject of a BBC documentary, Growing Old Disgracefully, part of the Imagine series. In 2013, she was listed as one of the 50 best-dressed over-50s by The Guardian.

In 2011, Granta Books published Instead of a Book: Letters to a Friend, a collection of letters from Athill to the American poet Edward Field chronicling their intimate correspondence spanning more than 30 years (he kept all her letters, she kept none of his). Granta Books published two further titles by her: Alive, Alive Oh!: And Other Things That Matter in 2015 and A Florence Diary in 2016.

=== Honours and awards ===
In 2008, she won the Costa Book Award for her memoir Somewhere Towards The End, a book about old age. For the same book, she also received the National Book Critics Circle Award in 2009.

Athill was appointed an Officer of the Order of the British Empire (OBE) in the 2009 New Year Honours for services to literature.

== Personal life ==
According to journalist Mick Brown, "She attributes her flight from convention to her first love, Tony Irvine, an RAF pilot with whom she fell in love at the age of 15, and who was blessed, she says, 'with a very open approach to life.'" The failure of her relationship with Irvine (referred to as Paul in Instead of a Letter), her "great love", "blighted" many years: "My affairs after that, I kept them trivial if I possibly could. I was frightened of intensity, because I knew I was going to be hurt." Irvine went to war in Egypt, and eventually stopped replying to Athill's letters, then two years later requested an end to their engagement. At the age of 43, Athill suffered a miscarriage.

She called herself a "sucker for oppressed foreigners", an inclination she characterized as a "funny kink" in her maternal instinct: "I never particularly wanted children, but it came out in liking lame ducks." One lover, the Egyptian author Waguih Ghali, a depressive, committed suicide in her flat. Her most remarkable affair, about which she later wrote a book, was "a fleeting, and distinctly odd" relationship with Hakim Jamal, an American Black radical who asserted he was God and who was a cousin of Malcolm X. Jamal's other lover, Gale Benson, was murdered by Trinidadian Black Power leader Michael X. Jamal was killed by others a year later. Athill's account of these events was published in 1993 as Make Believe: A True Story.

Her longest relationship was with the Jamaican playwright Barry Reckord. The affair lasted eight years, but he shared her flat for forty. She described it as a "detached" sort of marriage.

She moved into a flat in a north London residence for the "active elderly" at the end of 2009, saying about this decision: "Almost at once on arrival at the home I knew that it was going to suit me. And sure enough, it does. A life free of worries in a snug little nest...." Even during her old age, she reemphasized that she had no regrets about not having her own children, saying: "I dearly love certain young people of my acquaintance and am happy to have them in my life, but am I sorry that they are not my descendants? No, I much prefer thinking of them as surprising and very gratifying friends."

Athill died at a hospice in London on 23 January 2019, aged 101, following a short illness.

Her nephew and heir, the art historian Philip Athill, is managing director of the dealership and gallery, Abbott and Holder.

== Selected bibliography ==
=== Fiction ===
- 1962: An Unavoidable Delay, short stories
- 1967: Don't Look at Me Like That: A Novel. London: Chatto & Windus. New edition, Granta Books, 2001. ISBN 978-1862074415
- 2011: Midsummer Night in the Workhouse, short stories. London: Persephone Books. ISBN 978-1903155820

=== Autobiography ===
- 1963: Instead of a Letter. London: Chatto & Windus. New edition, Granta Books, 2001. ISBN 978-1862074545
- 1986: After a Funeral – winner of the J. R. Ackerley Prize for Autobiography. London: Jonathan Cape. ISBN 978-1847086334
- 1993: Make Believe. London: Sinclair-Stevenson. Reprinted, Granta Books, 2012. ISBN 978-1847086327
- 2000: Stet: A Memoir, London: Granta Books. ISBN 1-86207-388-0
- 2002: Yesterday Morning: A Very English Childhood. London: Granta Books. ISBN 978-1847084262
- 2008: Somewhere Towards the End – winner of Costa Prize for Biography. London: Granta Books. ISBN 978-1-84708-069-1
- 2009: Life Class: The Selected Memoirs of Diana Athill. London: Granta Books. ISBN 1-84708-146-0
- 2011: Instead of a Book: Letters to a Friend. London: Granta Books. ISBN 978-1-84708-414-9
- 2015: Alive, Alive Oh!: And Other Things That Matter. London: Granta Books. ISBN 978-1783782543
- 2016: A Florence Diary. London: Granta Books. ISBN 978-1-78378-316-8
