= Paraptila pseudogamma =

Scientific classification
- Kingdom: Animalia
- Phylum: Arthropoda
- Clade: Pancrustacea
- Class: Insecta
- Order: Lepidoptera
- Family: Tortricidae
- Genus: Paraptila
- Species: P. pseudogamma

Binomial name
- Paraptila pseudogamma Brown, 1991 (Note: The nominal year of publication is 1990, but Tortricidae.net/Catalogue of Life give 1991, indicating that the issue in question only appeared in print in 1991 rather than in 1990.)

Species of moth

Paraptila pseudogamma is a species of moth of the family Tortricidae. It is found in El Salvador.

== Description ==
The length of the forewings is 6 mm for males and 8.5 mm for females.
