= Paraptila biserrata =

Scientific classification
- Kingdom: Animalia
- Phylum: Arthropoda
- Clade: Pancrustacea
- Class: Insecta
- Order: Lepidoptera
- Family: Tortricidae
- Genus: Paraptila
- Species: P. biserrata

Binomial name
- Paraptila biserrata Brown, 1991

Species of moth

Paraptila biserrata is a species of moth of the family Tortricidae. It is found in Costa Rica.

== Description ==
The length of the forewings is about 5 mm.
