= Paraptila cornucopis =

Scientific classification
- Kingdom: Animalia
- Phylum: Arthropoda
- Clade: Pancrustacea
- Class: Insecta
- Order: Lepidoptera
- Family: Tortricidae
- Genus: Paraptila
- Species: P. cornucopis

Binomial name
- Paraptila cornucopis (Walsingham, 1914)

Synonyms
- Enarmonia cornucopis Walsingham, 1914; Paraptila equadora Brown, 1991

Species of moth

Paraptila cornucopis is a species of moth of the family Tortricidae. It is found in Mexico (Oaxaca, the Federal District, San Luis Potosí, Colima, and Veracruz), Colombia, and Ecuador.

The length of the forewings is 6.9–10 mm for males and 6.8–9.5 mm for females.
