= Paraptila bloomfieldi =

Scientific classification
- Kingdom: Animalia
- Phylum: Arthropoda
- Clade: Pancrustacea
- Class: Insecta
- Order: Lepidoptera
- Family: Tortricidae
- Genus: Paraptila
- Species: P. bloomfieldi

Binomial name
- Paraptila bloomfieldi Brown, 1991 (Note: The nominal year of publication is 1990, but Tortricidae.net/Catalogue of Life give 1991, indicating that the issue in question only appeared in print in 1991 rather than in 1990.)

Species of moth

Paraptila bloomfieldi is a species of moth of the family Tortricidae. It is found along the western coast of central Mexico (Colima, Jalisco, Guerrero).

The length of the forewings is 4.9–5.9 mm (0.19–0.23 in) for males and 5.5–6.5 mm (0.22–0.26 in) for females.
