= Malator =

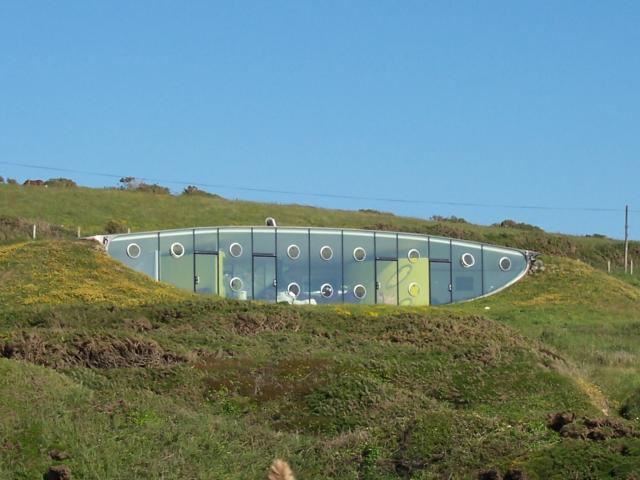
- Malator in 2005
- Interactive map of the Malator area

General information
- Architectural style: Earth house
- Location: Druidston, Pembrokeshire, Wales
- Coordinates: 51.8123°N 5.1015°W
- Completed: 1998
- Client: Bob Marshall-Andrews
- Owner: Bob Marshall-Andrews

Design and construction
- Architecture firm: Future Systems

Malator is a house in Druidston, Pembrokeshire, Wales, built in the Earth house architectural style. It was built for, and owned by, former Member of Parliament Bob Marshall-Andrews. The architectural firm who designed the building was Future Systems. Malator has appeared on television series such as the More4 programme Homes by the Sea, and has been received positively by critics with Architectural Digest listing it as one of the most innovative houses of the 20th century.

== Description ==
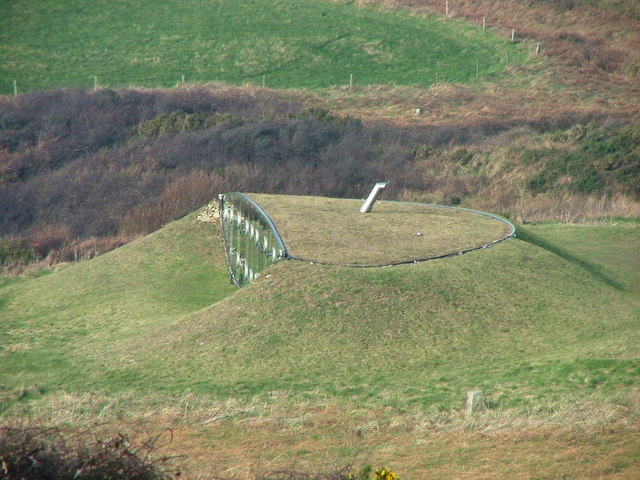
View of Malator from above

Malator is an Earth house, built with an exterior glass wall facing Druidston Haven and looking out over St Brides Bay, Pembrokeshire. It is sunk into the ground to have a minimal impact on the landscape. Inside, the building has an open-plan format in a style compared to that of a medieval hall. An open log fire is a centrepiece to the room, with communal seating located around it. Multi-coloured pods in that large room divide the space.

== History ==
It was built in 1998 for Bob Marshall-Andrews, QC, who was MP for the constituency of Medway from 1997 to 2010, and his wife Gill Marshall-Andrews. The architects on the project were Future Systems, a design company. The design of the building has resulted in it locally being referred to as the "Teletubby house" in reference to the building from the BBC children's television series. It was built as an earth house for design reasons rather than as part of any ecological requirement.

The building appeared in the first episode of the property television show Homes by the Sea, broadcast on the More4 channel on 16 October 2014. In the show, Marshall-Andrews gave a tour to presenter Charlie Luxton.

The history of the Malator's conception, design and construction is described in an interview of Ivan Margolius with Gill Marshall-Andrews in Jan Kaplický - For the Future and For Beauty book.

== Reception ==
In the dual language book Y Tu Mewn i Gartrefi Cymru / Inside Welsh Homes by Rachael Barnwell and Richard Suggett, Malator was described as representing an experiment that "will continue to change our ideas about the arrangement of our domestic space." Architectural Digest magazine included Malator in a list of the most innovative houses of the 20th century. In the Pembrokeshire volume of The Buildings of Wales series by Thomas Lloyd, Julian Orbach and Robert Scourfield, the authors called Malator a "success, the more shining amid the general failure of house design of the later [20th century]".
