= Ernest Young (politician) =

British Liberal politician

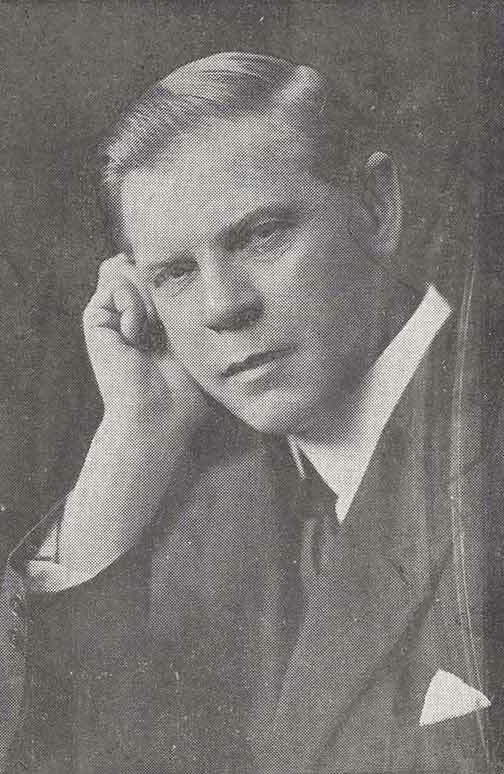
- Young circa 1917

Member of Parliament for Middlesbrough East
- In office 27 October 1931 – 25 October 1935
- Preceded by: Ellen Wilkinson
- Succeeded by: Alfred Edwards

Personal details
- Born: 28 July 1880 Sussex, England
- Died: 21 October 1953 (aged 73) Hove, England
- Party: Liberal

Ernest James Young (28 July 1880 – 21 October 1953) was a Liberal politician. He was a Councillor in Portslade and Member of Parliament for Middlesbrough East for one term in the 1930s. He was the first Headmaster of Harrow County School for Boys, Harrow, Middlesex from 1911 to 1919.

== Background ==
He was born in Sussex, a son of Trayton Young. He was educated privately. He started his career working on a farm. He then became a Builder. In 1908 he married Emily Phoebe Terry of Portslade. During World War One he served as a Sapper in the Royal Engineers. Phoebe died in 1919 aged 39. He became a lecturer, writer and journalist. His published works included 'Speech Building'.

== Political career ==
Young started his parliamentary career in 1917 when he was adopted as prospective Liberal candidate for the newly created division of Hammersmith South. However he did not contest the 1918 general election. He was elected to Portslade-by-Sea Urban District Council. He ran unsuccessfully for Parliament as the Liberal candidate at Jarrow in 1922 and at Rossendale in 1923 and 1924. He also ran in the Scottish constituency of Bothwell in Lanarkshire in March 1926, and in Middlesbrough East in 1929.

In 1931 an economic crisis led to the formation of a National Government led by Labour prime minister Ramsay MacDonald which was initially supported by the Conservative and Liberal parties. Young was elected as Liberal MP for Middlesbrough East at the 1931 general election as a supporter of the government and a member of the official Liberal party led by Sir Herbert Samuel, defeating the well-known local Labour MP, Ellen Wilkinson in a straight fight. Samuel and the Liberals, although agreeing to go into the 1931 general election supporting the government became increasingly concerned about the government's abandonment of the traditional Liberal policy of Free Trade and worried about the predominance of the Conservatives in the coalition, soon withdrew from the National Government. Some Liberals, led by Sir John Simon remained in the government and became known as the Liberal Nationals. Young refused to join this group and stuck with the Samuelite Liberals.

At the 1935 general election therefore, the coalition mantle had passed from Young to the Conservative candidate, Chetwynd-Talbot. In an election where the main fight was between the National Government and a revived Labour Party, Young lost his seat to Labour candidate Alfred Edwards who narrowly beat off the National government challenge. Young finished a poor third place in a three-cornered contest.

Young remained active in the Liberal Party, and was their election agent in Worthing in the 1945 general election. He died in Hove in 1953 aged 73.

=== Electoral record ===
General election 1922: Jarrow
Party	Candidate	Votes	%	±%
Labour	Robert John Wilson	17,208	53.9	+14.9
Unionist	Charles Harrie Innes-Hopkins	10,166	31.9	new
Liberal	Ernest James Young	4,522	14.2	−46.8
Majority		7,042	22.0	n/a
Turnout		31,896	82.2	+27.2
Registered electors		38,808		
Labour gain from Liberal		Swing	+30.9	

General election 1923: Rossendale
Party	Candidate	Votes	%	±%
Unionist	Robert Waddington	11,362	37.6	−5.0
Liberal	Ernest James Young	9,592	31.8	+10.9
Labour	Norman Angell	9,230	30.6	−5.9
Majority		1,770	5.8	−0.3
Turnout		30,184	83.8	−1.2
Unionist hold		Swing	-8.0	

General election 1924: Rossendale
Party	Candidate	Votes	%	±%
Unionist	Robert Waddington	12,836	41.7	+4.1
Labour	James Bell	9,951	32.4	+1.8
Liberal	Ernest James Young	7,958	25.9	−5.9
Majority		2,885	9.3	+3.5
Turnout		30,745		
Unionist hold		Swing		

Bothwell by-election, 1926
Party	Candidate	Votes	%	±%
Labour	Joseph Sullivan	14,830	59.7	+3.4
Unionist	Alexander Morrice Mackay	8,740	35.2	−8.5
Liberal	Ernest James Young	1,276	5.1	new
Majority		6,090	24.5	+11.9
Turnout		24,846	74.2	−5.1
Registered electors		33,505		
Labour hold		Swing	+6.0	

General election 1929: Middlesbrough East
Party	Candidate	Votes	%	±%
Labour	Ellen Wilkinson	12,215	41.3	+2.8
Liberal	Ernest James Young	9,016	30.6	+3.8
Unionist	John Wesley Brown	8,278	28.1	−6.6
Majority		3,199	10.7	+6.9
Turnout		29,509	80.8	−2.9
Labour hold		Swing	-0.5	

General election 1931: Middlesbrough East
Party	Candidate	Votes	%	±%
Liberal	Ernest James Young	18,409	60.4	+29.8
Labour	Ellen Wilkinson	12,080	39.6	−1.7
Majority		6,329	20.8	31.5
Liberal gain from Labour		Swing	+15.7	

General election 1935: Middlesbrough East
Party	Candidate	Votes	%	±%
Labour	Alfred Edwards	12,699	44.0	+4.4
Conservative	Benjamin Chetwynd-Talbot	12,632	43.7	new
Liberal	Ernest James Young	3,565	12.3	−48.1
Majority		67	0.3	n/a
Labour gain from Liberal		Swing	n/a	

Parliament of the United Kingdom
Preceded by Ellen Wilkinson	Member of Parliament for Middlesbrough East; 1931–1935	Succeeded by Alfred Edwards
