= Paraptila =

Scientific classification
- Kingdom: Animalia
- Phylum: Arthropoda
- Clade: Pancrustacea
- Class: Insecta
- Order: Lepidoptera
- Family: Tortricidae
- Tribe: Euliini
- Genus: Paraptila; Meyrick, 1912

Species
- 7 species (see text)

Genus of tortrix moths

Paraptila is a genus of moths belonging to the family Tortricidae. They occur in the Americas, from Mexico to northern South America.

== Species ==
There are seven recognized species:

- Paraptila argocosma Meyrick, 1912
- Paraptila biserrata Brown, 1991
- Paraptila bloomfieldi Brown, 1991
- Paraptila cornucopis (Walsingham, 1914)
- Paraptila gamma (Walsingham, 1914)
- Paraptila pseudogamma Brown, 1991
- Paraptila symmetricana Brown, 1991
