= Charles Warde =

British politician (1845–1937)

Warde in 1895.

Sir Charles Edward Warde, 1st Baronet (20 December 1845 – 12 April 1937) was a Conservative Party politician in England who served as a member of parliament (MP) from 1892 to 1918.

He was born in Ireland, the son of General Sir Edward Warde and his wife Jane Lane.

He was elected to the House of Commons at his first attempt, at the 1892 general election, for the Medway constituency, and held that seat until the constituency was abolished for the 1918 general election. He did not stand for Parliament again.

He was an officer in the 4th (Queen's Own) Hussars, and on 13 September 1899 was appointed Lieutenant Colonel in command of the West Kent Yeomanry (Queen's Own). He was granted the honorary rank of colonel on 31 January 1900.

In 1908, he was appointed a deputy lieutenant of Kent. He was made a baronet on 11 September 1919, of Barham Court in the Parish of Teston in the County of Kent.

He died in 1937 in Barham Court, after which the baronetcy became extinct. He had married Helen Caroline de Stern.

Parliament of the United Kingdom
Preceded by John Gathorne-Hardy	Member of Parliament for Medway; 1892 – 1918	Constituency abolished
Baronetage of the United Kingdom
New creation	Baronet (of Barham Court); 1919–1937	Extinct
