= Rochester and Chatham =

Former UK Parliament constituency

Coordinates: 51°23′N 0°31′E

- Former borough constituency for the House of Commons
- Rochester and Chatham in Kent, showing boundaries used from 1974 to 1983

1950–1983
- Seats: One
- Created from: Chatham
- Replaced by: Medway, Mid Kent

Rochester and Chatham was a parliamentary constituency in Kent which returned one Member of Parliament (MP) to the House of Commons of the Parliament of the United Kingdom from 1950 until it was abolished for the 1983 general election.

It largely replaced the former Chatham constituency, which had taken some of the previous Rochester seat in 1918. In turn it gave way to the Medway constituency in 1983, which was renamed Rochester and Strood in 2010.

== Boundaries ==
The Municipal Boroughs of Rochester and Chatham.

== History ==
This constituency was a Labour-Tory marginal seat throughout its 33-year existence.

The seat disappeared at the 1983 general election, and its territory was split between two new constituencies; 55.23% of it went to Medway, and 44.77% to Mid Kent.

== Members of Parliament ==
| Election | Member | Party |
|---|---|---|
| 1950 | Arthur Bottomley | Labour |
| 1959 | Julian Critchley | Conservative |
| 1964 | Anne Kerr | Labour |
| 1970 | Peggy Fenner | Conservative |
| Oct 1974 | Robert Bean | Labour |
| 1979 | Peggy Fenner | Conservative |
| 1983 | constituency abolished | |

== Election results ==
=== Elections in the 1950s ===
General election 1950: Rochester and Chatham
| Party | Candidate | Votes | % | ±% |
|---|---|---|---|---|
| Labour | Arthur Bottomley | 24,855 | 50.48 | |
| Conservative | Robert Mathew | 24,378 | 49.52 | |
| Majority | | 477 | 0.96 | |
| Turnout | | 49,233 | 84.17 | |
| Labour win (new seat) | | | | |

General election 1951: Rochester and Chatham
| Party | Candidate | Votes | % | ±% |
|---|---|---|---|---|
| Labour | Arthur Bottomley | 26,390 | 50.82 | |
| Conservative | Robert Mathew | 25,543 | 49.18 | |
| Majority | | 847 | 1.64 | |
| Turnout | | 51,933 | 85.52 | |
| Labour hold | | Swing | | |

General election 1955: Rochester and Chatham
| Party | Candidate | Votes | % | ±% |
|---|---|---|---|---|
| Labour | Arthur Bottomley | 26,645 | 52.41 | |
| Conservative | John D Campbell | 24,198 | 47.59 | |
| Majority | | 2,447 | 4.82 | |
| Turnout | | 50,843 | 82.24 | |
| Labour hold | | Swing | | |

General election 1959: Rochester and Chatham
| Party | Candidate | Votes | % | ±% |
|---|---|---|---|---|
| Conservative | Julian Critchley | 26,510 | 50.98 | |
| Labour | Arthur Bottomley | 25,487 | 49.02 | |
| Majority | | 1,023 | 1.97 | N/A |
| Turnout | | 51,997 | 80.76 | |
| Conservative gain from Labour | | Swing | | |

=== Elections in the 1960s ===
General election 1964: Rochester and Chatham
| Party | Candidate | Votes | % | ±% |
|---|---|---|---|---|
| Labour | Anne Kerr | 26,161 | 50.99 | |
| Conservative | Julian Critchley | 25,148 | 49.01 | |
| Majority | | 1,013 | 1.98 | |
| Turnout | | 51,309 | 76.42 | |
| Labour gain from Conservative | | Swing | | |

General election 1966: Rochester and Chatham
| Party | Candidate | Votes | % | ±% |
|---|---|---|---|---|
| Labour | Anne Kerr | 27,938 | 52.09 | |
| Conservative | Julian Critchley | 25,692 | 47.91 | |
| Majority | | 2,246 | 4.18 | |
| Turnout | | 53,630 | 78.11 | |
| Labour hold | | Swing | | |

=== Elections in the 1970s ===
General election 1970: Rochester and Chatham
| Party | Candidate | Votes | % | ±% |
|---|---|---|---|---|
| Conservative | Peggy Fenner | 30,263 | 54.84 | |
| Labour | Anne Kerr | 24,922 | 45.16 | |
| Majority | | 5,341 | 9.68 | N/A |
| Turnout | | 55,185 | 71.41 | |
| Conservative gain from Labour | | Swing | | |

General election February 1974: Rochester and Chatham
| Party | Candidate | Votes | % | ±% |
|---|---|---|---|---|
| Conservative | Peggy Fenner | 24,326 | 38.76 | |
| Labour | Roger R Kenward | 23,483 | 37.42 | |
| Liberal | C Fellowes | 14,945 | 23.83 | New |
| Majority | | 843 | 1.34 | |
| Turnout | | 62,754 | 79.33 | |
| Conservative hold | | Swing | | |

General election October 1974: Rochester and Chatham
| Party | Candidate | Votes | % | ±% |
|---|---|---|---|---|
| Labour | Robert Bean | 26,467 | 43.38 | |
| Conservative | Peggy Fenner | 23,049 | 39.27 | |
| Liberal | M Black | 9,035 | 15.39 | |
| National Front | G Hazelden | 1,150 | 1.96 | New |
| Majority | | 2,418 | 4.11 | N/A |
| Turnout | | 59,701 | 73.56 | |
| Labour gain from Conservative | | Swing | +2.7 | |

General election 1979: Rochester and Chatham
| Party | Candidate | Votes | % | ±% |
|---|---|---|---|---|
| Conservative | Peggy Fenner | 27,574 | 47.46 | |
| Labour | Robert Bean | 24,886 | 42.84 | |
| Liberal | M Black | 5,219 | 8.98 | |
| National Front | J King | 417 | 0.72 | |
| Majority | | 2,688 | 4.62 | N/A |
| Turnout | | 58,096 | 72.74 | |
| Conservative gain from Labour | | Swing | | |
