= Anne Kerr (politician) =

British politician

Anne Patricia Kerr

Member of Parliament for Rochester and Chatham
- In office 15 October 1964 – 29 May 1970
- Preceded by: Julian Critchley
- Succeeded by: Peggy Fenner

Personal details
- Born: Anne Patricia Bersey; 24 March 1925 Putney, Middlesex, England
- Died: 29 July 1973 (aged 48) London, England
- Party: Labour
- Spouses: James Doran Clark (m. 1944; div. 1952); Russell Kerr (m. 1960)
- Children: 1

Anne Patricia Kerr (née Bersey; 24 March 1925 – 29 July 1973) was a British Labour Party politician who was elected for two successive terms as a Member of Parliament.

== Early life ==
Born in Putney into a Methodist family, she spent most of her childhood in west London, attending St Paul's Girls School. She was evacuated to Budleigh Salterton in Devon, during the Second World War, and later joined the Women's Royal Naval Service. In 1944 she married James Doran Clark (subsequently TV and film scriptwriter James Doran) and in 1945 they had a son, Paddy. They were divorced in 1952.

Before entering politics she was an actress and television interviewer, using the name Anne Doran. She was elected in Putney at the 1958 London County Council election as Anne Clark, and held her seat until the council was abolished in 1965. She was an ardent opponent of capital punishment, a founder member of the Campaign for Nuclear Disarmament and was on the Committee of 100 set up by Bertrand Russell in 1960 to oppose nuclear weapons. She was married again in 1960 to fellow Labour politician Russell Kerr, who became MP for Feltham in 1966.

== Parliamentary career ==
She won the Rochester and Chatham seat at the 1964 general election, defeating the sitting Conservative MP Julian Critchley with a majority of 1,013 votes.

She defeated Critchley again at the 1966 general election, with an increased majority, but lost by over 5,000 votes at the 1970 election to Conservative Peggy Fenner.

Always passionately interested in human rights issues, Kerr was vocal in protesting against the executions of three black Rhodesians in 1968, the first since Rhodesia's Unilateral Declaration of Independence, placing a wreath of flowers outside the Rhodesian High Commission (Rhodesia House) in London on the day of the executions, on 6 March. She attended the 1968 Democratic National Convention in Chicago when she was detained and manhandled by police. She and her husband were also two of three British MPs who accompanied Gerry Fitt MP for West Belfast on the Civil Rights march in Derry on 5 October 1968, which is generally regarded as the starting point for the Troubles in Northern Ireland.

== Post-Parliamentary career and opposition to the Common Market ==
She was a staunch opponent of Britain's entry into Europe's Common Market, and after her 1970 defeat, she was a founder of Women Against the Common Market. In April 1972, she joined Women Against the Common Market in an anti-Europe protest on a ferry to Calais. When French riot police boarded the ferry, Kerr reportedly had to be pulled away from them, shouting "Let's have your gas."

== Death ==
Kerr died at her home at Twickenham of acute alcoholic poisoning on 29 July 1973, aged 48. At the inquest into her death, Russell Kerr said that she had never really recovered from being beaten by police at Chicago five years earlier.

Parliament of the United Kingdom
Preceded by Julian Critchley	Member of Parliament for Rochester and Chatham; 1964–1970	Succeeded by Peggy Fenner
