= Peggy Fenner =

British politician (1922–2014)

The Right Honourable Dame Peggy Fenner DBE
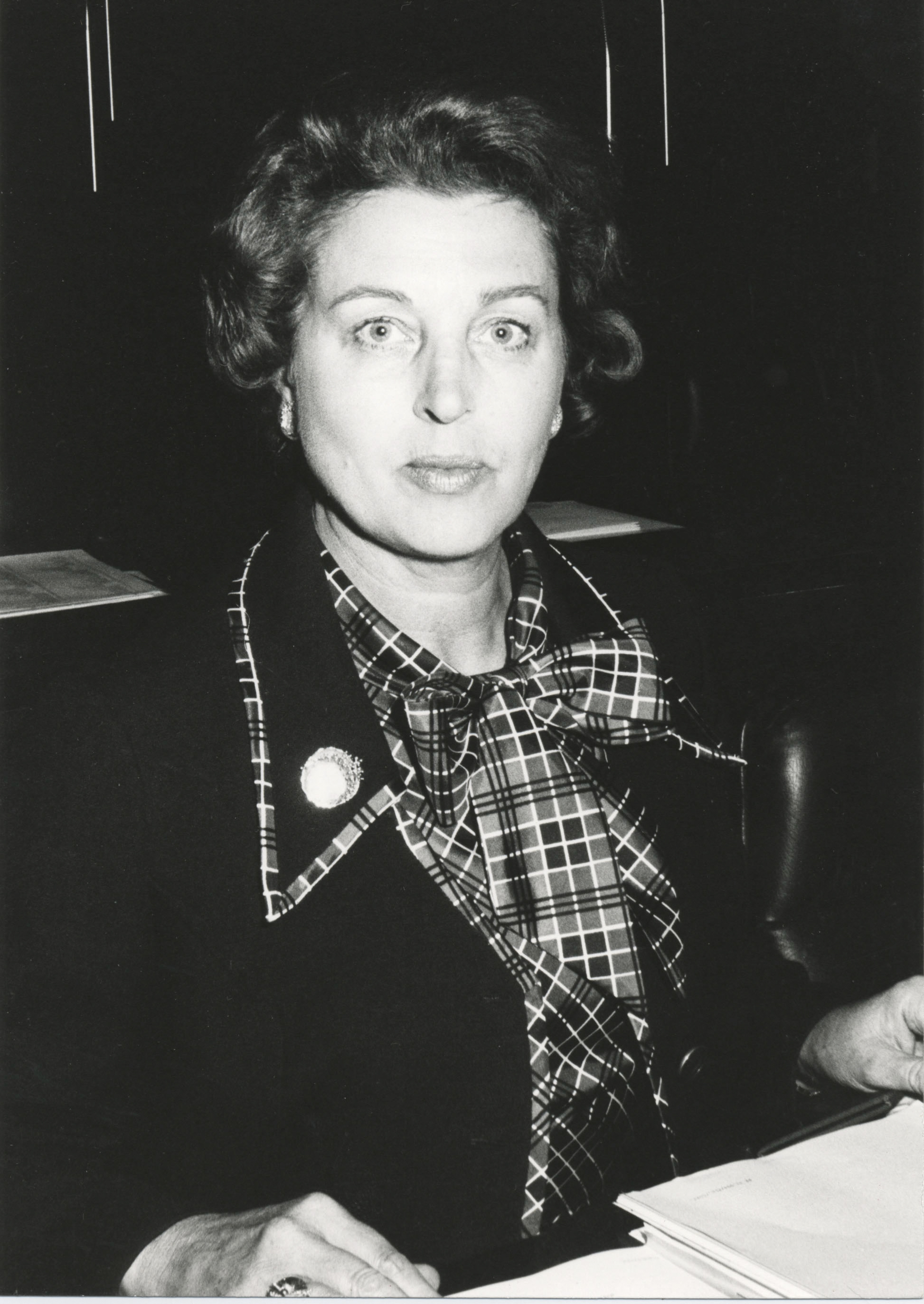

Member of Parliament for Medway Rochester and Chatham (1979 – 1983)
- In office 4 May 1979 – 8 April 1997
- Preceded by: Robert Bean
- Succeeded by: Bob Marshall-Andrews

Member of Parliament for Rochester and Chatham
- In office 19 June 1970 – 20 September 1974
- Preceded by: Anne Kerr
- Succeeded by: Robert Bean

British Delegate to the European Parliament 1974–1975
- In office 24 July 1974 – 28 February 1975

Personal details
- Born: Margaret Edith Webken; 12 November 1922 Lewisham, London, England
- Died: 15 September 2014 (aged 91) Pembury, Kent, England
- Party: Conservative
- Spouse: Bernard Fenner (m. 1940; died 2001)
- Children: 1 daughter

Dame Peggy Fenner, DBE (née Bennett; 12 November 1922 – 15 September 2014) was a British Conservative Party politician.

== Personal life ==
Fenner was born Margaret Edith Webken on 12 November 1922 in Lewisham, London. Her father, Henry Webken, a licensed victualler, changed the family's name by deed poll to Webb the following year. Fenner was cared for from infancy by her grandparents; her parents divorced when she was three and she never saw her father again, later taking her mother's maiden name of Bennett as her surname. Educated at a London County Council elementary school in Brockley (then in Kent), she went on to attend Ide Hill School in Sevenoaks, Kent, but left aged 14, going into domestic service. In 1940, aged 18. she married architect Bernard Fenner and went into wartime factory work. The couple had one daughter, Geraldine.

== Political career ==
Joining the Conservative Party in 1952, she was elected to Sevenoaks council five years later, chairing it in 1962 and 1963; she also served on the West Kent education executive. She made a strong impression among Kentish Tories, and in 1964 was shortlisted ahead of 104 applicants, almost all men, to succeed Harold Macmillan at Bromley. She missed out in the final selection, then again at Brighton Kemptown where the party was seeking — and would fail — to overturn a Labour majority of seven.

After unsuccessfully fighting Newcastle-under-Lyme in 1966, Fenner was elected MP for Rochester and Chatham at the 1970 general election. Rochester and Chatham Conservatives selected her to take on the Left-wing Labour MP Anne Kerr, and in 1970 she bettered the national swing to capture the seat by 5,341 votes. Both candidates bemoaned the fact that the other could not have found a man to defeat somewhere else, and when Peggy Fenner arrived in the Commons it was women's issues that she took up.

Her first success was to force the Royal Navy to scuttle a “dial a sailor” scheme for the public to befriend sailors docking away from their home port, after Navy wives complained. She joined other Tory women in trying to amend the recently liberalised divorce laws which ended the right of the “innocent party” to veto divorce after five years. Her work on the Expenditure Select Committee impressed, and in November 1972 Edward Heath appointed her Parliamentary Under-Secretary for Agriculture with responsibility for prices, which were becoming an issue as inflation set in. Peggy Fenner served as Parliamentary Secretary at the Ministry of Agriculture, Fisheries and Food, with responsibility for food, from November 1972 to February 1974 under Heath, and again from September 1981 to September 1986 under Margaret Thatcher. Upon leaving the government in 1986 she was appointed a Dame Commander of the Order of the British Empire.

At MAFF she took through the legislation obliging food producers to put sell-by dates on their products, but spent most of her time tackling a rising tide of complaints about higher meat prices, caused by a world shortage, and explaining a 48 per cent increase in food prices in three years. In the February 1974 election called by Heath over the miners’ strike, Peggy Fenner fought a tight battle with Roger Kenward, Labour, and her majority slumped to 843. In opposition, she joined Britain's contingent in the then-nominated European Parliament. She attended only a handful of sessions before Harold Wilson called another election and Labour's Bob Bean ousted her by 2,418 votes. She was out of the Commons for Thatcher's overthrow of Heath, and as the Tories regrouped for a return to government. She won back Rochester and Chatham in 1979, by 2,688 votes.

John Nott's decision to close Chatham dockyard was a blow to Peggy Fenner's constituents, many of whom took it out on their MP. Before she could launch a campaign against the closure, Mrs Thatcher, in September 1981, gave her back her old job at MAFF. Prices were now less of an issue, so she could address concerns over quality: the conditions in which veal calves and battery hens were kept, the amount of fat in mince and water in sausages, dyes in pet food, tighter curbs on pesticides, pesticide residues on lemons that were polluting gin-and-tonics, and the unsuitability of cling film for microwave cooking. She also presided over the first raising of the Thames Barrier.

At the 1983 election the Rochester and Chatham seat was abolished and Fenner was elected MP for the new constituency of Medway. She continued to hold the seat for the next fourteen years, being re-elected at the 1987 and 1992 general elections, until she lost it at the 1997 election to Labour's Bob Marshall-Andrews. On the death of Baroness Jeger in 2007, Fenner became the oldest living woman to have served as an MP in the United Kingdom.

Thatcher dropped her in September 1986 in a cull of junior ministers, compensating her with a DBE. Dame Peggy became a leading campaigner against the high speed link across Kent to the Channel Tunnel. For a decade from 1987 she returned to Strasbourg as a delegate to the Council of Europe and Western European Union. The 1997 election brought boundary changes and a heavy national swing to Labour. Dame Peggy, her 75th birthday approaching, went down by 5,354 votes to the colourful barrister Bob Marshall-Andrews.

== Death ==
Fenner died from a respiratory tract infection at a hospital in Pembury, Kent, on 15 September 2014, aged 91. Her husband and daughter both predeceased her. She was cremated on 16 October.

Parliament of the United Kingdom
| Preceded by Anne Kerr | Member of Parliament for Rochester and Chatham; 1970 – October 1974 | Succeeded by Robert Bean |
| Preceded by Robert Bean | Member of Parliament for Rochester and Chatham; 1979 – 1983 | Constituency abolished |
| New constituency | Member of Parliament for Medway; 1983 – 1997 | Succeeded by Bob Marshall-Andrews |
European Parliament
| New constituency | Part of the UK Delegation to the European Parliament 1974–1975 | UK Delegation |
