= Alfred Edwards (politician) =

British politician

Member of Parliament for Middlesbrough East
- In office 14 November 1935 – 3 February 1950
- Preceded by: Ernest Young
- Succeeded by: Hilary Marquand

Personal details
- Born: 23 March 1888
- Died: 17 June 1958 (aged 70)
- Party: Conservative (since 1949)
- Other political affiliations: Labour (until 1948)

Alfred Edwards (23 March 1888 – 17 June 1958) was a British politician who served for fifteen years as a Member of Parliament (MP). His origins were as a company director in the foundry industry in Middlesbrough, which led him into conflict with the Labour Party when it proposed to nationalise the iron and steel industries; profoundly unable to support the party, he crossed the floor and became an active Conservative Party supporter.

== Family and business ==
Edwards' father Thomas was from Middlesbrough and he was brought up in the town. He was only educated to elementary school level, leaving to work as a labourer in the Diamond grit works foundry. His obituary in The Times said that "by ability and sheer hard work he rose to become a director of an old-established local ironworks", this being Messrs. Harrison Bros. (England) Ltd. As a director, he had time to pursue other business interests in the town, and also farmed in Guisborough. He was also a frequent visitor to the United States on lecture tours.

== Middlesbrough politics ==
In 1931 Edwards joined the Labour Party, and the next year he was elected to Middlesbrough Town Council. He was chosen as the party's candidate for Middlesbrough East, and in the 1935 general election he fought a tense three-way contest against the sitting Liberal Party Member and a Conservative Party challenger. In the event the sitting Member's vote collapsed, and Edwards was elected with a tiny majority of 67 over the Conservative candidate.

== Parliament ==
Edwards began his Parliamentary career by moving a motion calling for the location of industry to be planned, in which he called for an area of 40 miles around London to be closed to new industry. He was concerned about a government proposal to help the iron and steel industry in Jarrow, arguing that it would become a competitor to his own constituency. In April 1937 he opposed the Conservative government's proposal for assistance to 'special areas', complaining that it had the deliberate intention of depriving Middlesbrough of the advantages other areas were to have. He made a failed attempt to get Middlesbrough included during the passage of the Bill, in which he was joined by the Middlesbrough West MP Frank Kingsley Griffith.

In 1937 he took up the issue of producing oil from coal, and claimed that the Falmouth Committee looking into the question had deliberately restricted its remit and sent an insulting letter to a company which might have helped it. Early in 1939 he protested against criticism of the police voiced in Parliament by Communist Party of Great Britain MP Willie Gallacher.

=== Second World War ===
Edwards greeted the threat of war with concern that the British Empire had supplied raw materials to enable Germany, Italy and Japan to build up vast armaments. He called for the United Kingdom and United States to join together to deny raw material to aggressive nations. When conscription was announced, Edwards pressed the Prime Minister to commit to conscription of wealth as well as man-power. He complained that "two gentlemen who are dictators in certain European countries" had a monopoly of the British press.

During the Second World War Edwards kept up pressure on the Government to assist industry. In 1941 he proposed that all import duties be abolished, and in December the same year he made a speech deploring the low rate of production placing the blame on the Treasury's "throttling hands". At the time when Sir Oswald Mosley was released from detention due to ill health, Edwards put down a question to ask how long it would take for him to get better before his return to prison. He called for the war-time coalition government to be broken up in January 1944, so that the country could benefit from "organized opposition". The issue of housing rebuilding concerned him, and in September 1944 he announced a scheme for a garden city to be built on the outskirts of Guisborough.

=== Excess profits tax ===
Re-elected in the 1945 general election with a majority of 8,075, Edwards raised the plight of some new Members of Parliament who were unable to find anywhere to stay in London. Edwards had been a critic of the Excess Profits Tax during the war, and called for its abolition after the end of the war, a campaign he continued despite Government resistance.

=== Christian Science ===
His faith as a Christian Scientist, which was said to be "unshakable", led Edwards to get involved in a prolonged dispute over whether Christian Science 'nurses' should be able to use that title despite not being State Registered Nurses. In 1945 he strongly opposed Conservative MP Hugh Linstead's motion to prevent them doing so, arguing that the Christian Science nurses did not compete with other nurses. When the Ministry of Health acquired the power to control the title 'nurse', he moved his own motion to allow the Christian Science use to continue, arguing that it had been stopped through a loophole in the law.

== Steel nationalisation ==
In 1948 Edwards hit trouble with his party over its proposal to nationalise the iron and steel industry. He spoke out against the proposal, based on his experience in the industry; which his local party felt was going back on election pledges to support it. In April 1948, the local party passed a resolution declaring that they had lost all confidence in him and calling on him to resign his seat. Edwards declared he would ignore the resolution. He intensified his criticism, describing the Civil service and efficiency as a contradiction in terms.

The Labour Party called Edwards before a board of the National Executive Committee to explain himself, and the party General Secretary Morgan Phillips wrote to him asking for a written undertaking about his future political conduct. Edwards failed to give a satisfactory response and was expelled from the party on 16 May 1948.

== Conservative Party ==
Edwards at first sat in Parliament as an Independent but he accepted invitations to speak from Conservative Party bodies. Speaking to the City of London Young Conservatives in July 1948 he apologised on behalf of his former party for Aneurin Bevan's attack on the Conservatives as "lower than vermin". Edwards began to argue against nationalisation as a whole, and claimed that few Labour Party MPs thought nationalisation was essential to socialism. When he suggested a campaign against steel nationalisation, the Steel Defence Campaign was established.

In August 1949, after his Parliamentary campaign against the Steel Bill had proved unsuccessful, Edwards announced that he had joined the Middlesbrough Conservative Association and applied for the Conservative Party whip in Parliament. He was immediately adopted as the Conservative candidate for his constituency, and made a speech praising private enterprise and denouncing Labour Party extremism.

== Defeat in 1950 ==
He experienced a turbulent campaign during the 1950 general election, at which he made steel nationalisation the main issue. The Times commented that "his meetings in Labour wards have the painful atmosphere of lessons in which the master is unteaching the last few years' work in one short period to a class unhampered by politeness". In the end, Edwards lost his seat by 16,783 votes to Hilary Marquand, the Minister of Pensions who had moved from his previous seat in Cardiff East.

== Conservative candidacies ==
Edwards was then picked as Conservative Party candidate for Newcastle-upon-Tyne East, which was still Labour held but more marginal. When steel nationalisation took effect, he was compelled to resign from the board of Gjers, Mills and Co. Ltd., of Ayresome Ironworks Middlesbrough, when the Iron and Steel Corporation informed him of a policy that only executive directors should hold office in nationalised companies. Edwards lost the 1951 election to Labour, but by only 2,771 votes.

In March 1953 Edwards was adopted as Conservative candidate for The Wrekin, a Shropshire division where Labour had a majority of 1,804. However, he was compelled to resign the candidacy in August 1954 owing to pressure of business commitments.

Parliament of the United Kingdom
| Preceded by Ernest Young | Member of Parliament for Middlesbrough East; 1935 – 1950 | Succeeded by Hilary Marquand |
