= Paraptila gamma =

Scientific classification
- Kingdom: Animalia
- Phylum: Arthropoda
- Clade: Pancrustacea
- Class: Insecta
- Order: Lepidoptera
- Family: Tortricidae
- Genus: Paraptila
- Species: P. gamma

Binomial name
- Paraptila gamma (Walsingham, 1914)

Synonyms
- Tortrix gamma Walsingham, 1914; Paraptila infusoria Meyrick, 1926

Species of moth

Paraptila gamma is a species of moth of the family Tortricidae. It is found in Mexico (Tabasco) and Costa Rica.

The length of the forewings is 6.5–7 mm for males and 10 mm for females.
