= Robert Bean (politician) =

British Labour politician (1935–1987)

Member of Parliament for Rochester and Chatham
- In office 10 October 1974 – 7 April 1979
- Preceded by: Peggy Fenner
- Succeeded by: Peggy Fenner

Personal details
- Born: 5 September 1935
- Died: 7 December 1987 (aged 52)
- Party: Labour
- Occupation: politician

Robert Ernest Bean (5 September 1935 – 7 December 1987) was a British Labour Party politician and polytechnic lecturer.

Having served as a councillor and fought Gillingham in 1970 and Thanet East in February 1974, Bean was elected Member of Parliament for the marginal Rochester and Chatham seat in the October of that year, ousting the Conservative incumbent Peggy Fenner. At the 1979 general election, when the Conservatives returned to government under Margaret Thatcher, Fenner regained the seat.

Bean was beaten by Fenner again at the new Medway seat in 1983, and he died in 1987 at the age of 52. He had a wife, with whom he had a daughter and son. He died before the births of two granddaughters and two grandsons.

Parliament of the United Kingdom
Preceded by Peggy Fenner	Member of Parliament for Rochester and Chatham; October 1974–1979	Succeeded by Peggy Fenner
