= Julian Critchley =

British journalist and Conservative Party politician (1930-2000)

Sir Julian Critchley

Member of Parliament for Aldershot
- In office 18 June 1970 – 8 April 1997
- Preceded by: Eric Errington
- Succeeded by: Gerald Howarth

Member of Parliament for Rochester and Chatham
- In office 8 October 1959 – 25 September 1964
- Preceded by: Arthur Bottomley
- Succeeded by: Anne Kerr

Personal details
- Born: Julian Michael Gordon Critchley; 8 December 1930 London, England
- Died: 9 September 2000 (aged 69) Hereford, England
- Party: Conservative (until 1999); Pro-Euro Conservative Party (after 1999)
- Spouses: Paula Baron (m. 1953; div. 1965); Heather Goodrick (m. 1965, separated)
- Children: 4
- Relatives: Macdonald Critchley (father)
- Education: Pembroke College, Oxford (BA)
- Occupation: Journalist; author; politician

Sir Julian Michael Gordon Critchley (8 December 1930 – 9 September 2000) was a British journalist, author and Conservative Party politician. He was the member of parliament for Rochester and Chatham from 1959 to 1964 and Aldershot from 1970 to 1997.

== Early life ==
Born in Islington, the son of distinguished neurologist Macdonald Critchley, CBE (1900–1997) and his first wife, midwife Edna Audleth (née Morris), Critchley was brought up in Swiss Cottage, North London, and in Shropshire, where he attended Brockhurst School, a preparatory school in Church Stretton, and later Shrewsbury School. He returned to London to take his Higher Certificate and was rejected from National Service after contracting polio. After a year living and studying at the Sorbonne in Paris he went up in 1951 to Pembroke College, Oxford, where he read Politics, Philosophy and Economics. In 1953 he was part of a team of Oxford undergraduates lobbying Vickers shipyard workers against nationalisation; the others were Michael Heseltine, Guy Arnold and Martin Morton. In 1955, he married Paula Baron, with whom he had two daughters.

== Political career ==
Critchley served as a Conservative Member of Parliament, first for Rochester and Chatham from 1959 to 1964 and then for Aldershot from 1970 until his retirement in 1997. While he was out of Parliament between 1964 and 1970 he worked as a journalist, including as a TV critic for The Times, and he continued to be active as a journalist and author throughout the remainder of his career. Having lost Rochester and Chatham in 1964, he stood again for the seat in the 1966 election, but was once again defeated by the Labour candidate Anne Kerr. In 1965, after his first marriage ended in divorce, he married Heather Goodrick, who was close friends with his first wife; they had two children.

Critchley was considered to be on the left wing of the Conservative Party (one of the "wets" in Thatcherite terminology) and never attained ministerial rank. He became identified as a prominent Tory critic of Margaret Thatcher. In 1980 he sparked controversy by writing an anonymous article in The Observer signed "by a Tory", in which he criticised Thatcher's "A level economics" and called her "didactic, tart and obstinate". He was later forced to admit authorship. He also memorably referred to Thatcher as "the great she-elephant" and claimed responsibility for the currency of the phrase "one of us", which she used privately to refer to any colleague whom she saw as loyal and supportive of her policies. (It was used by Hugo Young as the title of his biography of Thatcher.) Critchley was, however, supportive of Thatcher's stance at the time of the Falklands War.

Critchley was a long-standing friend of Michael Heseltine, having met him first at preparatory school. Both then went on to Shrewsbury and Pembroke College, Oxford, and Critchley was best man at Heseltine's wedding. Their friendship waned in the 1960s, but Critchley still supported Heseltine in the 1990 leadership election.

From the early 1990s Critchley became severely restricted in mobility from complications arising from the polio from which he had suffered as a young man. Still, he successfully re-contested Aldershot at the election in 1992. He then became an infrequent attender at the House of Commons until his retirement in 1997. He was knighted in 1995. By this time, his health was in further decline; he had been diagnosed with prostate cancer.

== Later life ==
After his retirement he was expelled from the mainstream Conservative party for backing the Pro-Euro Conservative Party in the 1999 European Parliament election. In later life he settled in Shropshire at Ludlow. Having separated from his second wife, he lived with Prue Bellak, with whom he had previously been in a relationship many years earlier, at the Sorbonne; they reunited by chance towards the end of his time as an MP. In 2000, he was further diagnosed with bone cancer and a brain tumour. His health declined steadily and he died in hospital at Hereford on 9 September 2000, at the age of 69. He was buried in the parish churchyard at Wistanstow near Craven Arms.

Critchley became highly regarded as a witty and acerbic political writer and journalist, increasingly so towards the end of his life. His 1994 volume of memoirs, A Bag of Boiled Sweets, was described by Jeremy Paxman as "the most entertaining set of political memoirs to have been published in years". He also wrote two mystery novels set in Parliament, Hung Parliament and Floating Voter, which feature an MP turned sleuth apparently based on Critchley himself along with a mixture of real and invented MPs, the latter providing the victims and suspects.

== Publications ==
- Westminster Blues: Minor Chords, Hamish Hamilton, 1985. ISBN 0-241-11387-3
- Heseltine: The Unauthorised Biography, André Deutsch, 1987. ISBN 0-233-98001-6; revised edition, 1994. ISBN 0-233-98902-1
- The Palace of Varieties: An Insider's View of Westminster, John Murray, 1989. ISBN 0-719-54729-6
- A Bag of Boiled Sweets. An Autobiography, Faber and Faber, 1994. ISBN 0-571-17496-5
- Collapse of Stout Party: The Decline and Fall of the Tories, Weidenfeld & Nicolson, 1997. (with Morrison Halcrow) ISBN 0-575-06277-0

Parliament of the United Kingdom
Preceded by Arthur Bottomley	Member of Parliament for Rochester and Chatham; 1959–1964	Succeeded by Anne Kerr
Preceded by Eric Errington	Member of Parliament for Aldershot; 1970–1997	Succeeded by Gerald Howarth
