= Hilary Marquand =

British politician (1901–1972)

The Right Honourable Hilary Marquand
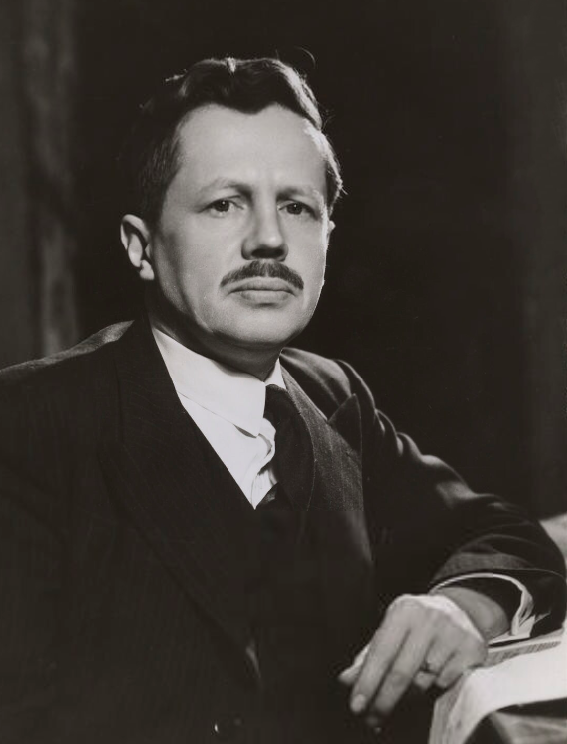
- Marquand in 1947

Minister of Health
- In office 17 January 1951 – 26 October 1951
- Monarch: George VI
- Prime Minister: Clement Attlee
- Preceded by: Aneurin Bevan
- Succeeded by: Harry Crookshank

Minister of Pensions
- In office 2 July 1948 – 17 January 1951
- Monarch: George VI
- Prime Minister: Clement Attlee
- Preceded by: George Buchanan
- Succeeded by: George Isaacs

Paymaster General
- In office 5 March 1947 – 2 July 1948
- Monarch: George VI
- Prime Minister: Clement Attlee
- Preceded by: Arthur Greenwood
- Succeeded by: The Viscount Addison
Shadow Cabinet positions
Opposition Chief Spokesman on Commonwealth Affairs
In office 1959–1961
Leader	Hugh Gaitskell
Shadowing	The Lord Ismay; The Marquess of Salisbury; Philip Cunliffe-Lister; Alec Douglas-Home; Duncan Sandys
Opposition Chief Spokesman on Pensions
In office 1951–1959
Leader	Clement Attlee; Hugh Gaitskell
Shadowing	Derick Heathcoat-Amory; Osbert Peake; John Boyd-Carpenter
Parliamentary Representation
Member of Parliament for Middlesbrough East
In office 23 February 1950 – 30 November 1961
Preceded by	Alfred Edwards
Succeeded by	Arthur Bottomley
Member of Parliament for Cardiff East
In office 5 July 1945 – 3 February 1950
Preceded by	James Grigg
Succeeded by	Constituency abolished

Personal details
- Born: Hilary Adair Marquand; 24 December 1901 Cardiff, Glamorganshire, Wales
- Died: 6 November 1972 (aged 70) Hellingly, Sussex, England
- Party: Labour
- Spouse: Rachel Eluned Rees (m. 1929)
- Children: 3, including David and Richard
- Education: University College, Cardiff

Hilary Adair Marquand, PC (24 December 1901 – 6 November 1972) was a British economist and Labour Party politician.

== Life and career ==
He was born in Cardiff, the son of Alfred Marquand of Saint Peter Port, Guernsey, a clerk in a coal exporting company and his wife Mary née Adair, who was of Scottish ancestry. He was educated at Cardiff High School and at University College, Cardiff (State Scholar) where he studied history and economics, completing his undergraduate studies in 1924. He subsequently spent two years in the United States as a Rockefeller Foundation Fellow: upon his return to the UK he was a lecturer in Economics at the University of Birmingham from 1926–1930, and Professor of Industrial Relations, University College, Cardiff, 1930–1945. At the time of his appointment in Cardiff he was 29 years old, making him the youngest Professor at a British university at the time.

He was Director of Industrial Surveys of South Wales, 1931 and 1936, and Member of the Cardiff Advisory Committee Unemployment Assistance Board. He spent a year in the USA in the study of industrial relations, 1932–1933 and was Visiting Professor of Economics at Wisconsin University in 1938–1939. He was an Acting Principal at the Board of Trade, 1940–1941, and Deputy Controller, Wales Division, of the Ministry of Labour, 1941–1942 and Labour Adviser to the Ministry of Production, 1943–1944.

Although he was from a staunchly Conservative family, Marquand joined the Labour Party in 1920 and the Fabian Society in 1936. He was elected as Member of Parliament for Cardiff East from 1945–1950, where he defeated the then War Secretary James Grigg to take the seat, and for Middlesbrough East from 1950–1961. He was Secretary for Overseas Trade from 1945–1947; Paymaster General, 1947–1948; Minister of Pensions, 1948–1951; and Minister of Health, January–October 1951. He was appointed a Privy Counsellor in 1949.

Following the defeat for Labour at the 1951 general election, Marquand was a prominent member of the Shadow Cabinet, serving as chief spokesman on pensions until 1959 and as chief spokesman on Commonwealth affairs under Hugh Gaitskell from 1959 to 1961.

He undertook lecture tours for the British Council in India, Pakistan and Ceylon, 1952–1953, in West Indies, 1954 and 1959 and in Finland, 1957, and was a representative at the Assemblies of the Council of Europe and Western European Union, 1957–1959. He was Deputy Chairman of the National Board for Prices and Incomes, 1965–1968. He was an Honorary Member of Phi Beta Kappa.

Increasingly unhappy with factional infighting within Labour, Marquand resigned his seat in Parliament in 1961, to take up the post of Director of the International Institute for Labour Studies, in Geneva. The consequent by-election was won by the Labour candidate Arthur Bottomley. He served in Geneva until 1965.

== Personal life ==
Hilary Marquand married Rachel Eluned Rees, a schoolteacher, on 20 August 1929. Their daughter Diana Marquand is an environmental campaigner and was a senior social worker. Their son David Marquand was also an academic and was a Labour MP from 1966 to 1977, while a younger son Richard Marquand became a notable Hollywood director.

Marquand died in 1972 at Hellingly Hospital, East Sussex, aged 70, and was buried at Cathays Cemetery, Cardiff.

Parliament of the United Kingdom
Preceded by James Grigg	Member of Parliament for Cardiff East; 1945–1950	Constituency abolished
Preceded by Alfred Edwards	Member of Parliament for Middlesbrough East; 1950–1961	Succeeded by Arthur Bottomley
Political offices
Preceded by Arthur Greenwood	Paymaster General; 1947–1948	Succeeded by Viscount Addison
Preceded by George Buchanan	Minister of Pensions; 1948–1951	Succeeded by George Isaacs
Preceded by Aneurin Bevan	Minister of Health; 1951	Succeeded by Harry Crookshank
