= List of members of the European Parliament for the United Kingdom (1973–1979) =

In this period, members of the European Parliament were not directly elected, but were chosen by and from among the members of the House of Commons and House of Lords as delegates. The total size of the United Kingdom delegation was 36 but the Labour Party refused to name its delegates because of the party's then policy of opposing British membership of the European Communities. After the 1975 referendum, Labour decided to take its seats.

Name	Party	Dates
== A ==
Lord Ardwick	Labour	3 July 1975 – 1979
== B ==
Guy Barnett	Labour	1 July 1975 – 24 May 1976
Sir Tufton Beamish	Conservative	1 January 1973 – 24 July 1974
Earl of Bessborough	Conservative	1 January 1973 – 1979
Lord Bethell	Conservative	10 March 1975 – 1979
Betty Boothroyd	Labour	1 July 1975 – 1 March 1977
Lord Brecon	Conservative	1 January 1973 – 24 October 1973
John Brewis	Conservative	1 January 1973 – 28 February 1975
Lord Brimelow	Labour	28 February 1977 – 30 June 1978
Ronald Brown	Labour	1 March 1977 – 1979
Lord Bruce of Donington	Labour	3 July 1975 – 1979
== C ==
Lord Castle	Labour	3 July 1975 – 1979
John Corrie	Conservative	28 February 1975 – 18 December 1975; 1 March 1977 – 1979
George Cunningham	Labour	13 March 1978 – 1979
== D ==
Tam Dalyell	Labour	1 July 1975 – 1979
Sir Geoffrey de Freitas	Labour	1 July 1975 – 1979
Sir Douglas Dodds-Parker	Conservative	1 January 1973 – 28 February 1975
Gwyneth Dunwoody	Labour	1 July 1975 – 1979
Hugh Dykes	Conservative	24 July 1974 – 1 March 1977
== E ==
Robert Edwards	Labour	1 March 1977 – 1979
Baroness Elles	Conservative	1 January 1973 – 3 July 1975
Tom Ellis	Labour	1 July 1975 – 1979
John Evans	Labour	1 July 1975 – 13 March 1978
Winnie Ewing	SNP	7 July 1975 – 1979
== F ==
Peggy Fenner	Conservative	24 July 1974 – 28 February 1975
Baroness Fisher of Rednal	Labour	3 July 1975 – 1979
Alan Fitch	Labour	13 March 1978 – 1979
Alex Fletcher	Conservative	18 December 1975 – 1 March 1977
Charles Fletcher-Cooke	Conservative	1 March 1977 – 1979
== G ==
Lord Gladwyn	Liberal	1 January 1973 – 3 July 1975; 8 July 1975 – 1 October 1976
Lord Gordon-Walker	Labour	3 July 1975 – 20 October 1976
== H ==
Willie Hamilton	Labour	1 July 1975 – 1979
James Hill	Conservative	1 January 1973 – 28 February 1975
John Hill	Conservative	1 January 1973 – 24 July 1974
Ralph Howell	Conservative	24 July 1974 – 1979
Mark Hughes	Labour	1 July 1975 – 1979
== J ==
Russell Johnston	Liberal	1 January 1973 – 7 July 1975; 1 October 1976 – 1979
== K ==
Elaine Kellett-Bowman	Conservative	28 February 1975 – 1979
Lord Kennet	Labour	28 February 1978 – 1979
Peter Kirk	Conservative	1 January 1973 – 17 April 1977
== L ==
Marquess of Lothian	Conservative	24 October 1973 – 3 July 1975
== M ==
Earl of Mansfield and Mansfield	Conservative	1 January 1973 – 10 March 1975
Bob Mitchell	Labour	1 July 1975 – 1979
William Molloy	Labour	24 May 1976 – 1 March 1977
Lord Murray of Gravesend	Labour	20 October 1976 – 28 February 1978; 30 June 1978 – 1979
== N ==
Tom Normanton	Conservative	1 January 1973 – 1979
== O ==
Lord O'Hagan	Cross-bencher	1 January 1973 – 3 July 1975
John Osborn	Conservative	28 February 1975 – 1979
== P ==
John Peel	Conservative	1 January 1973 – 24 July 1974
Rafton Pounder	Ulster Unionist	1 January 1973 – 24 July 1974
John Prescott	Labour	1 July 1975 – 1979
Christopher Price	Labour	1 March 1977 – 13 March 1978
== R ==
Lord Reay	Conservative	1 January 1973 – 1979
Sir Brandon Rhys Williams, Bt.	Conservative	1 January 1973 – 1979
Geoffrey Rippon	Conservative	6 May 1977 – 1979
== S ==
Lord St Oswald	Conservative	1 January 1973 – 1979
James Scott-Hopkins	Conservative	1 January 1973 – 1979
Michael Shaw	Conservative	24 July 1974 – 1979
James Spicer	Conservative	28 February 1975 – 1979
Michael Stewart	Labour	1 July 1975 – 19 November 1976
== T ==
Dick Taverne	Democratic Labour	4 April 1973 – 10 October 1974
Frank Tomney	Labour	19 November 1976 – 1 March 1977
== W ==
Sir Derek Walker-Smith	Conservative	1 January 1973 – 1979
Lord Walston	Labour	3 July 1975 – 28 February 1977

== See also ==
- Members of the European Parliament
