= Middlesbrough East =

Parliamentary constituency in the United Kingdom, 1918–1974

- Former borough constituency for the House of Commons
- County: North Riding of Yorkshire

1918–1974
- Seats: One
- Created from: Middlesbrough
- Replaced by: Middlesbrough

Middlesbrough East was a parliamentary constituency in the town of Middlesbrough in North East England. It returned one Member of Parliament (MP) to the House of Commons of the Parliament of the United Kingdom, elected by the first-past-the-post voting system.

The constituency was created for the 1918 general election, and abolished for the February 1974 general election.

== Boundaries ==
1918–1950: The County Borough of Middlesbrough wards of Exchange, Grove Hill, Ormesby, St Hilda's, and Vulcan.

1950–1964: The County Borough of Middlesbrough except the wards of Acklam, Ayresome, and Linthorpe.

1964–1974: The County Borough of Middlesbrough wards of Berwick Hills, Cannon, Clairville, Exchange, Grove Hill, Newport, North Ormesby, St Hilda's, Thorntree, and Tollesby.

== Members of Parliament ==
Year	Member	Party
1918	Penry Williams	Liberal
1922	John Wesley Brown	Unionist
1923	Penry Williams	Liberal
1924	Ellen Wilkinson	Labour
1931	Ernest Young	Liberal
1935	Alfred Edwards	Labour
1948	Alfred Edwards	Independent
1949	Alfred Edwards	Conservative
1950	Hilary Marquand	Labour
1962	Arthur Bottomley	Labour
1974	constituency abolished	

== Election results ==
=== Elections in the 1910s ===
General election 1918: Middlesbrough East
Party	Candidate	Votes	%
Liberal	Penry Williams*	8,470	69.2
Labour	Frederick William Carey	3,776	30.8
Majority		4,694	38.4
Turnout		12,516	48.4
Registered electors			
Liberal win (new seat)			

- Williams was issued with the Coalition Coupon, but repudiated it.

=== Elections in the 1920s ===
General election 1922: Middlesbrough East
Party	Candidate	Votes	%	±%
Unionist	John Wesley Brown	8,885	39.0	New
Labour	Martin Connolly	7,607	33.4	+2.6
Liberal	Penry Williams	6,295	27.6	−41.6
Majority		1,278	5.6	N/A
Turnout		22,787	78.8	+30.4
Registered electors				
Unionist gain from Liberal		Swing		

General election 1923: Middlesbrough East
Party	Candidate	Votes	%	±%
Liberal	Penry Williams	9,241	40.6	+13.0
Labour	Martin Connolly	7,712	33.9	+0.5
Unionist	James Reid	5,790	25.5	−13.5
Majority		1,529	6.7	N/A
Turnout		22,743	77.3	−1.5
Registered electors				
Liberal gain from Unionist		Swing		

General election 1924: Middlesbrough East
Party	Candidate	Votes	%	±%
Labour	Ellen Wilkinson	9,574	38.5	+1.6
Unionist	John Warde-Aldam	8,647	34.7	+9.2
Liberal	Penry Williams	6,688	26.8	−13.8
Majority		927	3.8	N/A
Turnout		24,909	83.7	+6.4
Registered electors				
Labour gain from Liberal		Swing		

General election 1929: Middlesbrough East
Party	Candidate	Votes	%	±%
Labour	Ellen Wilkinson	12,215	41.3	+2.8
Liberal	Ernest Young	9,016	30.6	+3.8
Unionist	John Wesley Brown	8,278	28.1	−6.6
Majority		3,199	10.7	+6.9
Turnout		29,509	80.8	−2.9
Registered electors				
Labour hold		Swing	-0.5	

=== Elections in the 1930s ===
General election 1931: Middlesbrough East
Party	Candidate	Votes	%	±%
Liberal	Ernest Young	18,409	60.4	+29.8
Labour	Ellen Wilkinson	12,080	39.6	−1.7
Majority		6,329	20.8	N/A
Turnout		30,489	84.5	+3.7
Registered electors				
Liberal gain from Labour		Swing		

General election 1935: Middlesbrough East
Party	Candidate	Votes	%	±%
Labour	Alfred Edwards	12,699	44.0	+4.4
Conservative	Benjamin Chetwynd-Talbot	12,632	43.7	New
Liberal	Ernest Young	3,565	12.3	−48.1
Majority		67	0.3	N/A
Turnout		25,331	81.14	−3.4
Registered electors				
Labour gain from Liberal		Swing		

=== Elections in the 1940s ===
General Election 1939–40:

Another General Election was required to take place before the end of 1940. The political parties had been making preparations for an election to take place from 1939 and by the end of this year, the following candidates had been selected;

- Labour: Alfred Edwards
- Conservative: Benjamin Chetwynd-Talbot

General election 1945: Middlesbrough East
Party	Candidate	Votes	%	±%
Labour	Alfred Edwards	17,427	65.1	+21.1
Conservative	Benjamin Chetwynd-Talbot	9,352	34.9	−8.8
Majority		8,075	30.2	+29.9
Turnout		26,779	76.7	−4.4
Registered electors				
Labour hold		Swing		

=== Elections in the 1950s ===
General election 1950: Middlesbrough East
Party	Candidate	Votes	%
Labour	Hilary Marquand	29,185	62.77
Conservative	Alfred Edwards	12,402	26.67
Liberal	Russell Thomas	4,540	9.76
Communist	N Levy	367	0.79
Majority		16,783	36.10
Turnout		46,494	82.90
Registered electors			
Labour win (new boundaries)			

General election 1951: Middlesbrough East
Party	Candidate	Votes	%	±%
Labour	Hilary Marquand	31,277	66.51	
Conservative	Ralph Meredyth Turton	15,749	33.49	
Majority		15,528	33.02	
Turnout		47,026	80.93	
Registered electors				
Labour hold		Swing		

General election 1955: Middlesbrough East
Party	Candidate	Votes	%	±%
Labour	Hilary Marquand	27,036	62.42	
Conservative	Bernard A Connelly	16,278	37.58	
Majority		10,758	24.84	
Turnout		43,314	72.72	
Registered electors				
Labour hold		Swing		

General election 1959: Middlesbrough East
Party	Candidate	Votes	%	±%
Labour	Hilary Marquand	29,391	61.54	
Conservative	Derek R Chapman	18,365	38.46	
Majority		11,026	23.08	
Turnout		47,756	76.21	
Registered electors				
Labour hold		Swing		

=== Elections in the 1960s ===
1962 Middlesbrough East by-election
Party	Candidate	Votes	%	±%
Labour	Arthur Bottomley	18,928	60.60	−0.94
Liberal	George Scott	7,145	22.87	New
Conservative	Frederick Wood	4,613	14.77	−23.69
Union Movement	Jeffrey Hamm	550	1.76	New
Majority		11,783	37.73	+14.65
Turnout		31,236	52.1	−24.1
Registered electors				
Labour hold		Swing		

General election 1964: Middlesbrough East
Party	Candidate	Votes	%	±%
Labour	Arthur Bottomley	29,432	69.50	
Conservative	Frederick Wood	12,917	30.50	
Majority		16,515	39.00	
Turnout		42,349	72.94	
Registered electors				
Labour hold		Swing		

General election 1966: Middlesbrough East
Party	Candidate	Votes	%	±%
Labour	Arthur Bottomley	28,404	75.10	
Conservative	Peter Darby	9,420	24.90	
Majority		18,984	50.20	
Turnout		37,824	68.27	
Registered electors				
Labour hold		Swing		

=== Elections in the 1970s ===
General election 1970: Middlesbrough East
Party	Candidate	Votes	%	±%
Labour	Arthur Bottomley	23,581	71.02	
Conservative	Nigel Neville Laville	9,623	28.98	
Majority		13,958	42.04	
Turnout		33,204	60.35	
Registered electors				
Labour hold		Swing		
