= Paraptila argocosma =

Scientific classification
- Kingdom: Animalia
- Phylum: Arthropoda
- Clade: Pancrustacea
- Class: Insecta
- Order: Lepidoptera
- Family: Tortricidae
- Genus: Paraptila
- Species: P. argocosma

Binomial name
- Paraptila argocosma Meyrick, 1912

Species of moth

Paraptila argocosma is a species of moth of the family Tortricidae. It is found in Colombia.

== Description ==
The length of the forewings is about 11.5 mm. The ground colour of the forewings is dark red brown in the basal area, narrowly bordered by white distally. There is a light purple-grey lateral band with light tan-orange striae. The ground colour of the remaining area are orange mixed with red brown and streaks of white. The hindwings are white with uniform light grey-brown overscaling.
