= Arthur Bottomley =

British politician (1907–1995)

The Right Honourable The Lord Bottomley OBE PC
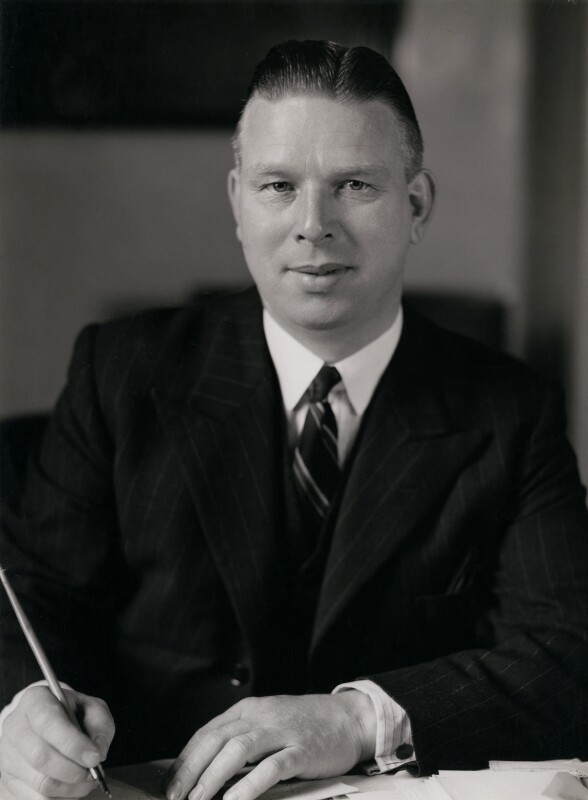
- Bottomley in 1946

Minister of Overseas Development
- In office 11 August 1966 – 29 August 1967
- Prime Minister: Harold Wilson
- Preceded by: Anthony Greenwood
- Succeeded by: Reg Prentice

Secretary of State for Commonwealth Relations
- In office 16 October 1964 – 1 August 1966
- Prime Minister: Harold Wilson
- Preceded by: Duncan Sandys
- Succeeded by: Herbert Bowden

Secretary for Overseas Trade
- In office 7 October 1947 – 26 October 1951
- Prime Minister: Clement Attlee
- Preceded by: Harold Wilson
- Succeeded by: Henry Hopkinson
Parliamentary offices
Member of Parliament for Middlesbrough Middlesbrough East (1962–1974)
In office 15 March 1962 – 13 May 1983
Preceded by	Hilary Marquand
Succeeded by	Stuart Bell
Member of Parliament for Rochester and Chatham Chatham (1945–1950)
In office 5 July 1945 – 18 September 1959
Preceded by	Leonard Plugge
Succeeded by	Julian Critchley

Personal details
- Born: Arthur George Bottomley; 7 February 1907 London, England
- Died: 3 November 1995 (aged 88) London, England
- Party: Labour
- Spouse: Bessie Wiles (m. 1936)

Arthur George Bottomley, Baron Bottomley, OBE PC (7 February 1907 – 3 November 1995) was a British Labour Party politician, Member of Parliament and minister.

== Early life ==
Before entering parliament he was a trade union organiser of the National Union of Public Employees (which later became part of UNISON). From 1929 to 1949 he was a councillor on Walthamstow Borough Council, and in 1945–1946 he was Mayor of Walthamstow. He was appointed an Officer of the Order of the British Empire (OBE) in the 1941 Birthday Honours.

== Parliamentary career ==
Bottomley was first elected to parliament in the 1945 general election for the Chatham division of Rochester and he held the seat (later renamed Rochester and Chatham) until losing it in the 1959 general election to the Conservative Julian Critchley. He returned to parliament by winning Middlesbrough East in a 1962 by-election and held the seat, and its successor Middlesbrough, until his retirement in 1983.

Bottomley was a junior minister in Clement Attlee's governments, being Parliamentary Under-Secretary of State for Dominion Affairs (1946–47), Parliamentary Under-Secretary of State for Commonwealth Relations (1947) and Secretary for Overseas Trade at the Board of Trade (1947–51). In Harold Wilson's governments, Bottomley was Secretary of State for Commonwealth Relations (1964–66) — during which time he sought to deal with the consequences of Rhodesia's Unilateral Declaration of Independence — and Minister of Overseas Development (1966–67).

Announced in the 1984 New Year Honours, he was created a life peer as Baron Bottomley of Middlesbrough in the County of Cleveland, on 31 January 1984.

Lord Bottomley died on 3 November 1995 at the age of 88.

== Family ==
His wife, Bessie Ellen Bottomley (née Wiles), JP, whom he married in 1936, was named a Dame Commander of the Order of the British Empire in 1970 "[f]or public and social services."

Bessie Ellen Bottomley died in 1998 in Redbridge, Essex.

== Publications ==
- The Use and Abuse of Trade Unions, London: Ampersand, 1963.
- With George Sinclair, Control of Commonwealth Immigration. An Analysis and Summary of the Evidence taken by the Select Committee on Race Relations and Immigration 1969–70. London: Runnymede Trust, 1970 (ISBN 9780902397033).
- Commonwealth, Comrades, and Friends, Somaiya Publications, 1986.

Parliament of the United Kingdom
Preceded by Leonard Frank Plugge	Member of Parliament for Chatham; 1945 – 1950	Constituency abolished
New constituency	Member of Parliament for Rochester and Chatham; 1950 – 1959	Succeeded by Julian Critchley
Preceded by Hilary Marquand	Member of Parliament for Middlesbrough East; 1962 – Feb 1974	Constituency abolished
New constituency	Member of Parliament for Middlesbrough; Feb 1974 – 1983	Succeeded by Stuart Bell
Political offices
Preceded by Duncan Sandys	Secretary of State for Commonwealth Relations; 1964–1966	Succeeded by Herbert Bowden as Secretary of State for Commonwealth Affairs
Preceded by Anthony Greenwood	Minister of Overseas Development; 1966–1967	Succeeded by Reg Prentice
