= Druidston =

Hamlet in Pembrokeshire, Wales

Coordinates: 51°48′27″N 5°05′31″W

Druidston is a hamlet within the community of Nolton and Roch on the St Brides Bay coast of Pembrokeshire, Wales. Druidston Cross is an eastern outlier of the hamlet. The coast is 1/2 mile to the west where cliffs up to 80m in height overlook a rocky shore platform and the sandy beach of Druidston Haven which is popular with swimmers and surfers. The Pembrokeshire Coast Path which has since 2012 formed a part of the longer Wales Coast Path passes north - south along the cliff tops. Malator is an innovative earth house which is built into the hillside overlooking the bay.
