= Bob Marshall-Andrews =

British politician & author (born 1944)

Bob Marshall-Andrews KC
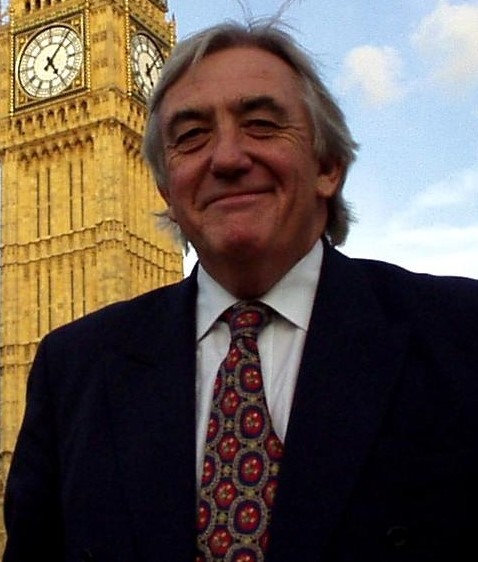

Member of Parliament for Medway
- In office 1 May 1997 – 12 April 2010
- Preceded by: Peggy Fenner
- Succeeded by: Mark Reckless (Rochester and Strood)

Personal details
- Born: 10 April 1944 (age 82) Willesden, London
- Party: Labour (1971–2017); Liberal Democrats (2017–)
- Spouse: Gill Marshall-Andrews
- Children: 2
- Education: University of Bristol
- Occupation: Politician
- Profession: Barrister

Robert Graham Marshall-Andrews KC (born 10 April 1944) is a British barrister, author, and retired politician, who was the Labour Member of Parliament (MP) for Medway from 1997 to 2010. He defected from his former party at the 2017 general election and endorsed the Liberal Democrats.

== Early life and career ==
Marshall-Andrews attended Mill Hill School before attending Bristol University where he read Law and was a resident of Wills Hall. He has prosecuted and defended most forms of serious crime and serious criminals, and specialises in commercial fraud. He is described in Chambers Legal Directory as "superb at commanding the attention of the jury" and "well prepared [...] proves brilliant in presentation". He is a member of the Criminal Bar Association and has been called to the Hong Kong Bar where he has been retained to prosecute serious cases. He was awarded an Honorary Doctorate of Laws from the University of Bristol in 2015.

Marshall-Andrews joined the Labour Party in 1971 and contested the constituency of Richmond, Surrey in October 1974. He was asked to stand for the Medway Constituency in 1992 which he lost to the incumbent Conservative, Dame Peggy Fenner. He is a member of the Association of Labour Lawyers, Greenpeace and the Woodland Trust.

== Parliamentary career ==
=== First terms (1997–2005) ===
Marshall-Andrews entered Parliament in the 1997 general election. He was perceived as being on the libertarian-left wing of the Labour Party, and was a member of the Socialist Campaign Group, but unlike other members of this group was not a trade-unionist by background. He was successfully re-elected in 2001, and tackled the immigration issue directly. "The difference between you and me is that you are a racist and I am not", he told a voter. "And under no circumstances are you allowed to vote for me. You will not vote for me!"

After a period of bedding down as a new MP, where he aided in the drafting of the banning of handguns, he became an irritant to the government front bench. He rebelled against the government on multiple occasions (20 of those rebellions being in the 2005 parliament), mainly on issues relating to civil liberty. In particular, he successfully opposed proposals to restrict the right to jury trial and to introduce 90 days executive detention without trial. He was in the vanguard of opposition to the Iraq War.

=== Later term (2005–10) ===
During the night of the 2005 general election, Marshall-Andrews appeared on national television to comment on his predicted defeat before it had been officially declared, remarking that it would be the only good news Tony Blair would get that night, while launching a scathing attack on the Prime Minister. However, he managed to hold on to the seat, with a narrow majority of 213 votes.

His penchant for rebellion, combined with his friendliness towards many Conservative MPs, led him to become unpopular within parts of his own party. According to The Times, senior Labour MPs demanded that the whip be withdrawn from him as an example to the 49 Labour MPs who rebelled against the government's plans to detain terror suspects for 90 days.

During a break in the Terror Bill debate on 9 November 2005, Marshall-Andrews was seen talking to Conservative MPs Andrew Mitchell, Greg Knight and Damian Green in the Commons lobby. Labour MP Barry Sheerman remonstrated with him. Fellow Labour MP Jim Dowd intervened and at one stage grabbed Marshall-Andrews by the lapels. Dowd and several observers believed they heard him saying of Dowd, "Here's another faggot". The near-scuffle was broken up by government whip Tom Watson, but was widely reported. Marshall-Andrews subsequently insisted that he had actually shouted "faccio", an Italian word meaning a menial assistant, from which the public school slang 'fag' is thought to derive. On 31 October 2006, Marshall-Andrews was one of 12 Labour MPs to back Plaid Cymru and the Scottish National Party's call for an inquiry into the Iraq War. Despite his leftist position, however, he nominated Gordon Brown (rather than John McDonnell) for the Labour Party leadership in 2007 and Peter Hain as deputy leader at the same time.

On 15 June 2008, with former Labour cabinet minister Tony Benn, Marshall-Andrews again rebelled in his support for Conservative MP David Davis' campaign to step down as an MP and force a by-election in his constituency over the bill for a maximum 42-day detention without charge for arrested suspects. Such an action would normally be against party rules, although he believed his withdrawal from the Labour Party whip was improbable because the party was unlikely to put up a candidate against Davis in the by-election. He felt through his action that "the voice of a substantial part of the Labour party may be heard", over a measure which gained strong resistance among Labour MPs and supporters.

In December 2008, Marshall-Andrews became the first Labour MP to publicly call for the resignation of Speaker Michael Martin over the arrest of Damian Green.

On 17 July 2007, he declared that he would stand down as a Labour MP at the next election, and he left the House of Commons at the 2010 general election.

=== Expenses ===
In 2009, it became known Marshall-Andrews had claimed £118,000 for expenses at his second home.

== Other activities and later life ==
Marshall-Andrews has written several novels, including The Palace of Wisdom (published by Hamish Hamilton and Penguin in 1989, also published in the US, France and a best-seller in Germany) and A Man Without Guilt (published by Methuen in 2002). More recently, Camille And The Lost Diaries of Samuel Pepys was published by Whitefox in 2016. His political memoir Off Message was published by Profile in 2011. He has written articles in the national newspapers (The Daily Telegraph, The Guardian, The Independent, The Sunday Times) and periodicals (New Statesman, parliament's The House magazine, and Tribune).

He is an honorary associate of the National Secular Society, a distinguished supporter of Humanists UK, trustee and chair of the development committee of the Geffrye Museum, chair of governors of the Grey Court School (1987–1994). With his wife, he owns "Malator", an innovative grass-roofed house, known locally as the "Teletubby house", in Druidston, Pembrokeshire. He is also founder and trustee of the George Adamson Wildlife Trust, currently operating in Mkomazi National Park, Tanzania.

On 20 April 2017, the day after parliament voted for an early general election, Marshall-Andrews defected to the Liberal Democrats, calling his former party a "basket-case" and citing its position on Brexit and the failure of his former party to stand down in the 2016 Richmond Park by-election in favour of the Liberal Democrats as reasons for his defection.

== Publications ==
- Bob Marshall-Andrews (1989). The Palace of Wisdom. Penguin Books Ltd. ISBN 978-0525248101.
- Bob Marshall-Andrews (2012). Off Message. Profile Books. ISBN 978-1846684425.
- Bob Marshall-Andrews (2016). Camille: And the Lost Diaries of Samuel Pepys. ISBN 978-1911195122
- Bob Marshall-Andrews (2018). Dump. Whitefox Publishing Ltd. ISBN 978-1911195597.

Parliament of the United Kingdom
Preceded by Peggy Fenner	Member of Parliament for Medway; 1997–2010	Succeeded by Constituency abolished
