= Medway (constituency) =

UK Parliament constituency (1983–2010)

Coordinates: 51°26′N 0°30′E

- Former county constituency for the House of Commons
- Boundary of Medway in Kent for the 2005 general election

- Location of Kent within England
- County: Kent
- Major settlements: Rochester, Strood

1983–2010
- Seats: One
- Created from: Rochester & Chatham and Gravesend
- Replaced by: Rochester and Strood, Chatham and Aylesford

1885–1918
- Seats: One
- Created from: West Kent
- Replaced by: Gravesend, Sevenoaks, Maidstone and Chatham

Medway was a county constituency represented in the House of Commons of the Parliament of the United Kingdom between 1983 and 2010. A previous constituency of the same name existed from 1885 to 1918.

== Boundaries ==
=== 1885–1918 ===
The Mid or Medway Division of Kent was created by the Redistribution of Seats Act 1885. It comprised a rural area consisting of the petty sessional divisions of Bearstead, Rochester and part of Malling PSD, but did not include the Medway Towns which were comprised in the parliamentary boroughs of Chatham and Rochester. It also surrounded, but did not include the town of Maidstone. It comprised these parishes:

- Addington
- Allhallows
- Allington
- Aylesford
- Bearsted
- Bicknor
- Birling
- Boughton Malherbe
- Boughton Monchelsea
- Boxley
- Bredhurst
- Broomfield
- Burham
- Chalk
- Chatham (rural)
- Chart Sutton
- Cliffe
- Cobham
- Cooling
- Cuxton
- Denton
- Ditton
- East Barming
- East Farleigh
- East Malling
- East Sutton
- Frindsbury (rural)
- Frinsted
- Gillingham (rural)
- Grange
- Halling
- Harrietsham
- Headcorn
- High Halstow
- Higham
- Hollingbourne
- Hoo Peninsula
- Hucking
- Ifield
- Ightham
- Isle of Grain
- Langley
- Leeds
- Lenham
- Leybourne
- Lidsing
- Linton
- Loose
- Luddesdown
- Meopham
- Mereworth
- Northfleet (rural)
- Nursted
- Offham
- Otterden
- Ryarsh
- St Mary Hoo
- Shorne
- Snodland
- Stansted
- Stockbury
- Stoke
- Strood (rural)
- Sutton Valence
- Teston
- Thurnham
- Trottiscliffe
- Ulcombe
- Wateringbury
- West Barming
- West Farleigh
- West Malling
- West Peckham
- Wichling
- Wormshill
- Wouldham
- Wrotham

The Rochester seat is an old one, going back to the 16th century, but it saw many changes in the 20th century. In 1918 it was split between Chatham and Gillingham. The Chatham seat became Rochester and Chatham in 1950, and then Medway in 1983.

=== 1983–2010 ===
The constituency was revived in 1983 by Parliament's acceptance of a Boundary Commission national review, and was defined as comprising thirteen wards of the then City of Rochester upon Medway: All Saints, Cuxton and Halling, Earl, Frindsbury, Frindsbury Extra, Hoo St. Werburgh, Rede Court, St. Margarets and Borstal, Temple Farm, Thames Side, Town, Troy Town and Warren Wood.

Boundaries were not changed at the next redistribution that followed the Fourth Review for the 1997 election.

In 1998, Rochester-upon-Medway was merged with the neighbouring Gillingham Borough Council to form the larger unitary Borough of Medway. The Medway constituency covered only part of the new unitary authority, which also encompassed the entirety of the (Gillingham constituency and the majority of the Chatham and Aylesford constituency. Because of this, the seat was renamed Rochester and Strood in 2010 to avoid confusion.

=== Boundary review ===
Following the boundary review of parliamentary representation in Kent between 2000 and 2008, the Boundary Commission for England renamed the Medway seat to Rochester and Strood, in order to avoid confusion with the larger unitary authority of Medway.

Upon its creation, the new Rochester and Strood constituency consisted of ten wards of the Borough of Medway: Cuxton and Halling, Peninsula, River, Rochester East, Rochester South and Horsted, Rochester West, Strood North, Strood Rural and Strood South.

== Members of Parliament ==
=== MPs 1885–1918 ===
| Election | Member | Party |
|---|---|---|
| 1885 | John Gathorne-Hardy | Conservative |
| 1892 | Charles Warde | Conservative |

=== MPs 1983–2010 ===
| Election | Member | Party |
|---|---|---|
| 1983 | Dame Peggy Fenner | Conservative |
| 1997 | Bob Marshall-Andrews | Labour |
| 2010 | Constituency abolished: see Rochester and Strood | |

== Election results 1885-1918 ==
=== Elections in the 1880s ===
General election 1885: Medway
| Party | Candidate | Votes | % | ±% |
|---|---|---|---|---|
| Conservative | John Gathorne-Hardy | 6,212 | 54.8 | |
| Liberal | Sydney Waterlow | 5,118 | 45.2 | |
| Majority | | 1,094 | 9.6 | |
| Turnout | | 11,330 | 84.0 | |
| Registered electors | | 13,482 | | |
| Conservative win (new seat) | | | | |

General election 1886: Medway
| Party | Candidate | Votes | % | ±% |
|---|---|---|---|---|
| Conservative | John Gathorne-Hardy | Unopposed | | |
| Conservative hold | | | | |

=== Elections in the 1890s ===
Steadman

General election 1892: Medway
| Party | Candidate | Votes | % | ±% |
|---|---|---|---|---|
| Conservative | Charles Warde | 6,337 | 59.1 | N/A |
| Lib-Lab | W. C. Steadman | 4,391 | 40.9 | New |
| Majority | | 1,946 | 18.2 | N/A |
| Turnout | | 10,728 | 74.1 | N/A |
| Registered electors | | 14,484 | | |
| Conservative hold | | Swing | N/A | |

Warde

General election 1895: Medway
| Party | Candidate | Votes | % | ±% |
|---|---|---|---|---|
| Conservative | Charles Warde | Unopposed | | |
| Conservative hold | | | | |

=== Elections in the 1900s ===
General election 1900: Medway
| Party | Candidate | Votes | % | ±% |
|---|---|---|---|---|
| Conservative | Charles Warde | Unopposed | | |
| Conservative hold | | | | |

Williams

General election 1906: Medway
| Party | Candidate | Votes | % | ±% |
|---|---|---|---|---|
| Conservative | Charles Warde | 6,167 | 50.4 | N/A |
| Liberal | Aneurin Williams | 6,061 | 49.6 | New |
| Majority | | 106 | 0.8 | N/A |
| Turnout | | 12,228 | 83.6 | N/A |
| Registered electors | | 14,628 | | |
| Conservative hold | | Swing | N/A | |

=== Elections in the 1910s ===
General election January 1910: Medway
| Party | Candidate | Votes | % | ±% |
|---|---|---|---|---|
| Conservative | Charles Warde | 8,093 | 60.5 | +10.1 |
| Liberal | Alexander Cairns | 5,285 | 39.5 | −10.1 |
| Majority | | 2,808 | 21.0 | +20.2 |
| Turnout | | 13,378 | 88.1 | +4.5 |
| Conservative hold | | Swing | +10.1 | |

General election December 1910: Medway
| Party | Candidate | Votes | % | ±% |
|---|---|---|---|---|
| Conservative | Charles Warde | Unopposed | | |
| Conservative hold | | | | |

General Election 1914–15:

Another General Election was required to take place before the end of 1915. The political parties had been making preparations for an election to take place and by July 1914, the following candidates had been selected;

- Unionist: Charles Warde
- Liberal:

== Elections 1983-2005 ==
=== Elections in the 2000s ===
General election 2005: Medway
| Party | Candidate | Votes | % | ±% |
|---|---|---|---|---|
| Labour | Bob Marshall-Andrews | 17,333 | 42.2 | −6.8 |
| Conservative | Mark Reckless | 17,120 | 41.7 | +2.5 |
| Liberal Democrats | Geoffrey Juby | 5,152 | 12.5 | +3.2 |
| UKIP | Bob Oakley | 1,488 | 3.6 | +1.1 |
| Majority | | 213 | 0.5 | −9.3 |
| Turnout | | 41,093 | 61.1 | +1.6 |
| Labour hold | | Swing | −4.6 | |

General election 2001: Medway
| Party | Candidate | Votes | % | ±% |
|---|---|---|---|---|
| Labour | Bob Marshall-Andrews | 18,914 | 49.0 | +0.1 |
| Conservative | Mark Reckless | 15,134 | 39.2 | +2.3 |
| Liberal Democrats | Geoffrey Juby | 3,604 | 9.3 | −0.9 |
| UKIP | Nikki Sinclaire | 958 | 2.5 | +1.6 |
| Majority | | 3,780 | 9.8 | −2.2 |
| Turnout | | 38,610 | 59.5 | −12.8 |
| Labour hold | | Swing | | |

=== Elections in the 1990s ===
General election 1997: Medway
| Party | Candidate | Votes | % | ±% |
|---|---|---|---|---|
| Labour | Bob Marshall-Andrews | 21,858 | 48.9 | +14.3 |
| Conservative | Peggy Fenner | 16,504 | 36.9 | −15.4 |
| Liberal Democrats | Roger D.C. Roberts | 4,555 | 10.2 | +0.6 |
| Referendum | Joseph Main | 1,420 | 3.2 | New |
| UKIP | Susan P. Radlett | 405 | 0.9 | New |
| Majority | | 5,354 | 12.0 | N/A |
| Turnout | | 44,742 | 72.3 | −7.9 |
| Labour gain from Conservative | | Swing | +14.9 | |

General election 1992: Medway
| Party | Candidate | Votes | % | ±% |
|---|---|---|---|---|
| Conservative | Peggy Fenner | 25,924 | 52.3 | +1.3 |
| Labour | Bob Marshall-Andrews | 17,138 | 34.6 | +4.8 |
| Liberal Democrats | Cyril L. Trice | 4,751 | 9.6 | −8.5 |
| Liberal | Mark Austin | 1,480 | 3.0 | New |
| Natural Law | Paul A. Kember | 234 | 0.5 | New |
| Majority | | 8,786 | 17.7 | −3.5 |
| Turnout | | 49,527 | 80.2 | +7.2 |
| Conservative hold | | Swing | −1.7 | |

=== Elections in the 1980s ===
General election 1987: Medway
| Party | Candidate | Votes | % | ±% |
|---|---|---|---|---|
| Conservative | Peggy Fenner | 23,889 | 51.0 | +2.1 |
| Labour | Vernon Hull | 13,960 | 29.8 | −0.3 |
| SDP | Jennifer Horne-Roberts | 8,450 | 18.1 | −2.0 |
| Green | June Rosser | 504 | 1.1 | New |
| Majority | | 9,929 | 21.2 | +2.4 |
| Turnout | | 46,803 | 73.0 | +0.4 |
| Conservative hold | | Swing | | |

General election 1983: Medway
| Party | Candidate | Votes | % | ±% |
|---|---|---|---|---|
| Conservative | Peggy Fenner | 22,507 | 48.9 | |
| Labour | Robert Bean | 13,851 | 30.1 | |
| SDP | Frederick Charles Winckless | 9,658 | 20.1 | |
| Majority | | 8,656 | 18.8 | |
| Turnout | | 46,016 | 72.6 | |
| Conservative win (new seat) | | | | |

== See also ==
- List of parliamentary constituencies in Kent
