= John Wesley Brown =

John Wesley Brown, JP (1873 – 8 November 1944) was Conservative Party member of the UK House of Commons for Middlesbrough East between the general elections of 1922 and 1923. He later unsuccessfully contested the seat in 1929.

A businessman, Brown was chairman of Hanson, Brown and Company Limited, general merchants and shipbrokers, Middlesbrough and Newcastle-on-Tyne. He was also director of various local companies. He was one of the founders of the Chartered Institute of Shipbrokers.

Brown was mayor of Middlesbrough for 1932–1933, a member of the town council and chairman of its finance committee, as well as chairman of its education committee. He was a member of The Tees Conservancy Commission and of the Tees Pilotage Commission. He was a vice-consul for Argentina.

He was a JP for Middlesbrough.

Parliament of the United Kingdom
Preceded by Penry Williams	Member of Parliament for Middlesbrough East; 1922–1923	Succeeded by Penry Williams
