= Chatham Dockyard =

Former Royal Navy Dockyard in Kent, England

HM Dockyard, Chatham
- Chatham, Kent
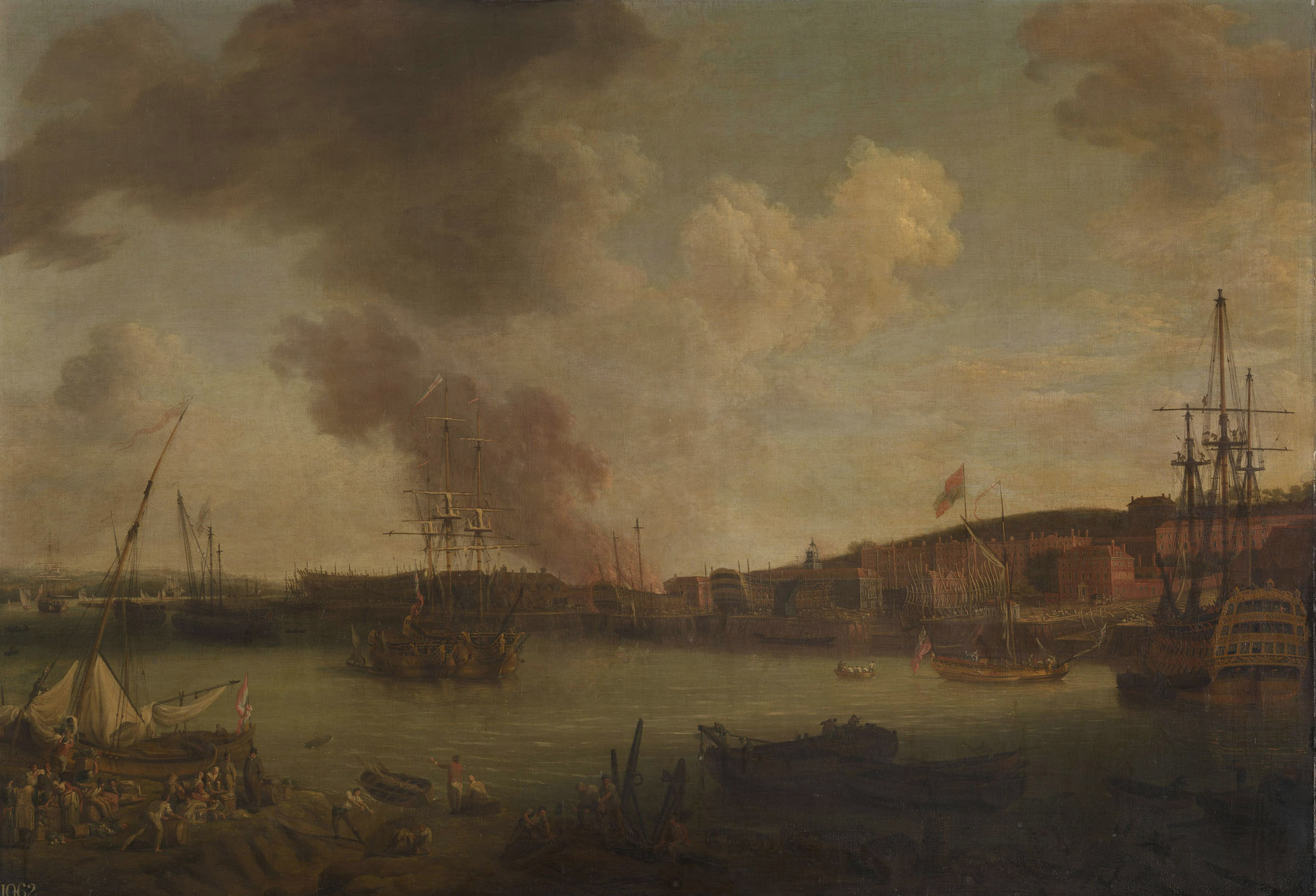
- c. 1770 painting of Chatham Dockyard by Richard Paton

Site information
- Operator: Royal Navy
- Controlled by: The Navy Board (until 1832); the Admiralty (1832–1964).
- Open to the public: as Chatham Historic Dockyard
- Other site facilities: Military barracks and fortifications
- Website: Chatham Historic Dockyard

Location
- Chatham Dockyard (Kent)
- Coordinates: 51°23′50″N 00°31′40″E

Site history
- In use: 1567–1984
- Fate: Preserved as a maritime heritage visitor attraction
- Events: Raid on the Medway, 1667

Chatham Dockyard was a Royal Navy Dockyard located on the River Medway in Kent. Established in Chatham in the mid-16th century, the dockyard subsequently expanded into neighbouring Gillingham; at its most extensive (in the early 20th century) two-thirds of the dockyard lay in Gillingham, one-third in Chatham.

It came into existence at the time when, following the Reformation, relations with the Catholic countries of Europe had worsened, leading to a requirement for additional defences. Over 414 years Chatham Royal Dockyard provided more than 500 ships for the Royal Navy, and was at the forefront of shipbuilding, industrial and architectural technology. At its height, it employed over 10,000 skilled artisans and covered 400 acres (1.6 km^{2}). Chatham dockyard closed in 1984, and 84 acres (34 ha) of the Georgian dockyard is now managed as the Chatham Historic Dockyard visitor attraction by the Chatham Historic Dockyard Trust.

== Overview ==
Joseph Farington (1747–1821) was commissioned by the Navy Board to paint a panoramic view of Chatham Dockyard (as part of a project to create a visual record of all six home yards) in 1785. The painting, now in the National Maritime Museum, provides a detailed illustration of the yard as it was in the Age of Sail; many of the buildings and structures illustrated survive:

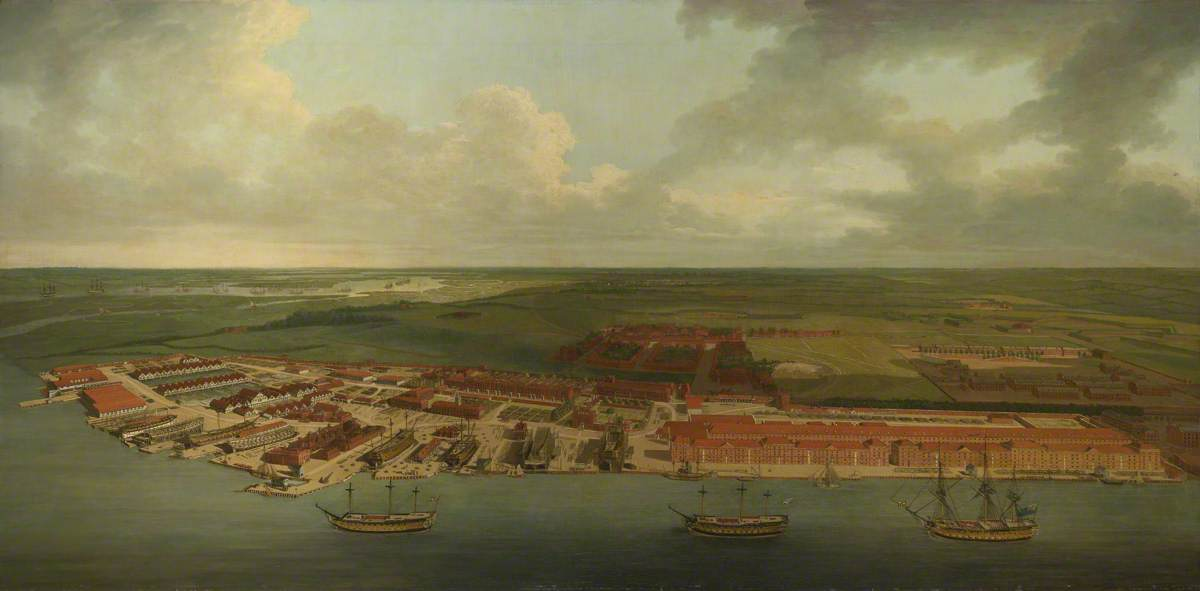
Looking from right to left (i.e. south to north) along the river bank can be seen: the two Anchor Wharf Storehouses (with the Rope House and associated buildings behind); two shipbuilding slips (between which can be seen the Commissioner's House with its large garden, beyond which is the Sail and Colour Loft); two dry docks (with Clock Tower Storehouse behind them, and the Officers' Terrace beyond); the old Smithery (later demolished); two more dry docks (beyond which can be seen the Masthouses and Mouldloft); further building slips (with the two Mast Ponds beyond them); and some Boat Houses (later demolished). In the distance (far left) St Mary's Island can be seen, and ships at anchor on Gillingham Reach. In the centre of the painting, beyond the walls of the Dockyard, is the town of Brompton and, to the right, Chatham Barracks.

=== Descriptions of the working dockyard ===
William Camden (1551–1623) described Chatham dockyard as

...stored for the finest fleet the sun ever beheld, and ready at a minute’s warning, built lately by our most gracious sovereign Elizabeth at great expense for the security of her subjects and the terror of her enemies, with a fort on the shore for its defence.

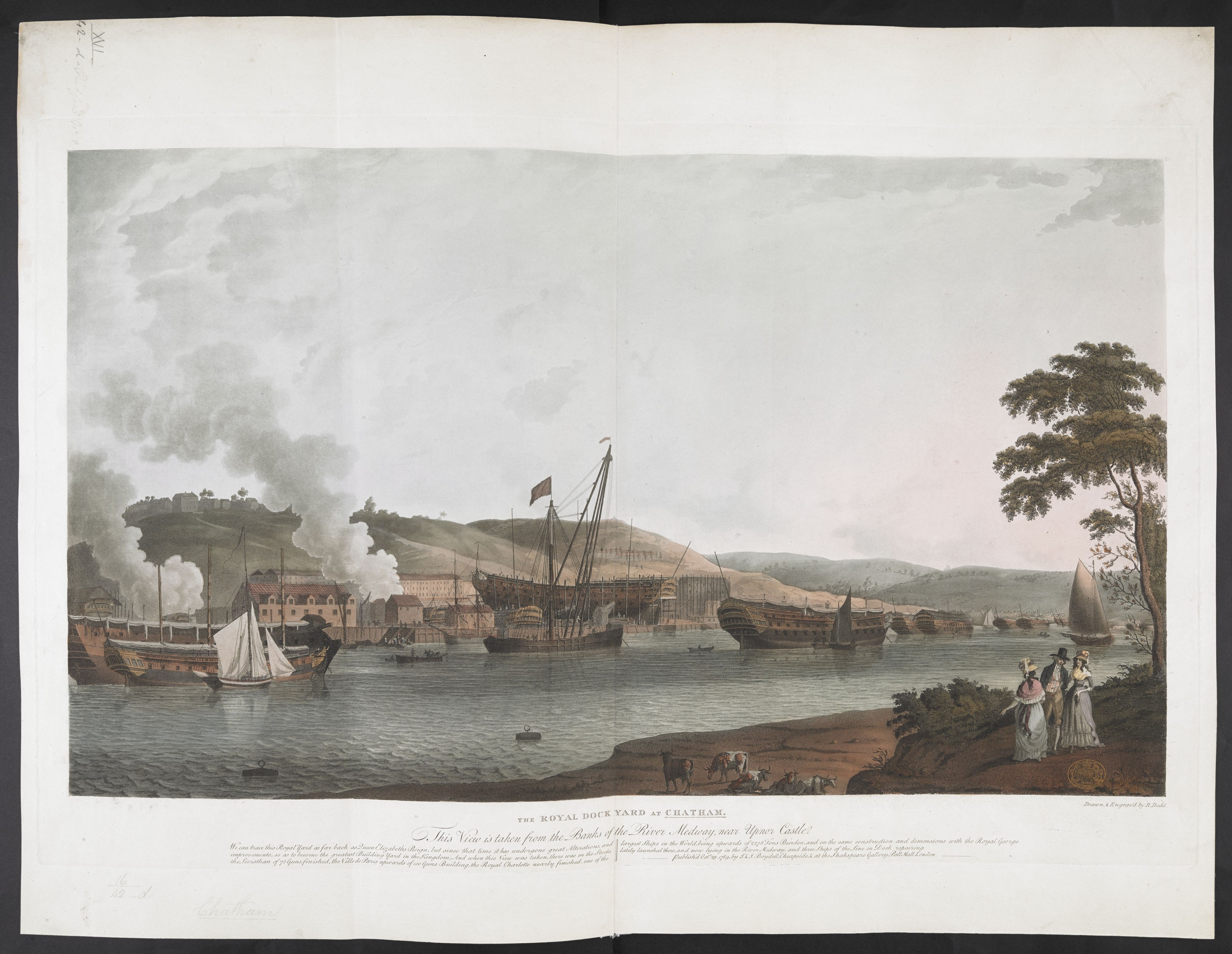
The Dockyard as depicted by Robert Dodd in 1789

Daniel Defoe (c. 1660 – 1731), visiting the yard in 1705, also spoke of its achievements with an almost incredulous enthusiasm:

So great is the order and application there, that a first-rate vessel of war of 106 guns, ordered to be commissioned by Sir Cloudesley Shovell, was ready in three days. At the time the order was given the vessel was entirely unrigged; yet the masts were raised, sails bent, anchors and cables on board, in that time.

Charles Dickens (1812–1870), who had grown up in Chatham, returned in later life and described in 1861 the novel sight (and sounds) of a ship being built for the first time of iron (rather than wood):

Twelve hundred men are working at her now; twelve hundred men working on stages over her sides, over her bows, over her sterns, under her keel, between her decks, down in her hold, within her and without, crawling and creeping into the finest curves of her lines wherever it is possible for men to twist. Twelve hundred hammerers, measurers, caulkers, armourers, forgers, smiths, shipwrights; twelve hundred dingers, clashers, dongers, rattlers, clinkers, bangers, bangers, bangers!

== History ==
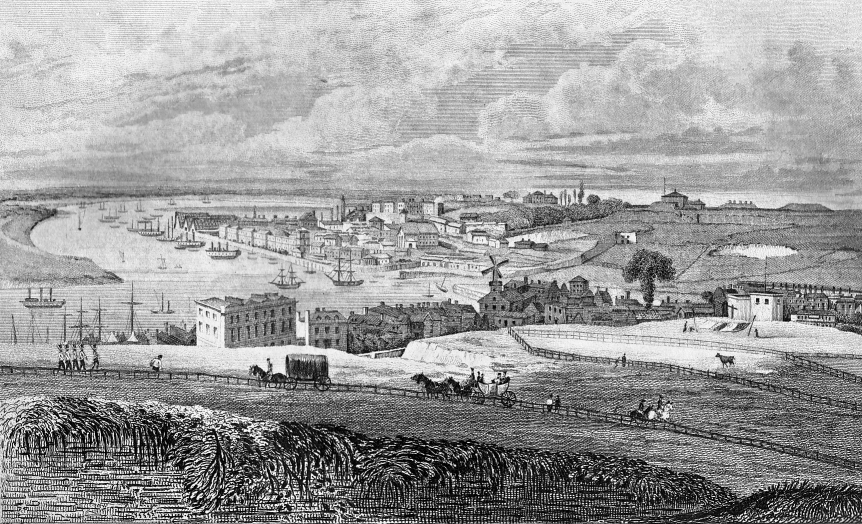
Engraving of "Chatham Dockyard from Fort Pitt" from Ireland's History of Kent, Vol. 4, 1831. Facing p. 349. Drawn by G. Sheppard, engraved by R. Roffe.

=== Gillingham Water ===
Chatham's establishment as a naval dockyard was precipitated by the use of the Medway as a safe anchorage by the ships of what became (under King Henry VIII) England's permanent Royal Navy. In 1550, a decree was issued to the Lord High Admiral that:

all the Kinges shippes should be harborowed in Jillyngham Water – saving only those that be at Portsmouth

Even prior to this, there is evidence of certain shore facilities being established in the vicinity for the benefit of the King's ships at anchor: there are isolated references from as early as 1509 to the hiring of a storehouse nearby and from 1547 this becomes a fixed item in the Treasurer's annual accounts. (At around the same time a victualling store was also established, in nearby Rochester, to provide the ships and their crews with food.) The storehouse would have furnished ships with such necessary consumables as rope, pulleys, sailcloth and timber. Careening took place on the river, according to a Privy Council instruction of 1550; for more specialised repairs and maintenance, however, ships would have had to travel to one of the purpose-built royal dockyards (the nearest being those on the Thames: Deptford and Woolwich).

=== The early dockyard ===
1567 is generally seen as the date of Chatham's establishment as a Royal Naval Dockyard. In the years that followed the ground was prepared, accommodation was secured and in 1570 a mast pond was installed. The following year a forge was built for anchor-making. At around the same time a large house was leased (the Hill House) for administrative purposes including meetings of the Council of Marine Causes. (Hill House would serve as the dockyard's Pay Office for the next 180 years; the Royal Marine Barracks were later built on its site).

The renowned Tudor shipwright Mathew Baker was appointed to Chatham in 1572 (though he was primarily based at Deptford). Under his supervision the site was developed to include sawpits, workshops, storehouses and a wharf with a treadmill crane (completed in 1580). Most significantly, Chatham's first dry dock was opened in 1581 (for repairing naval galleys). The first ship to be built at the dockyard, a 10-gun pinnace named HMS Merlin (or Merlyon), was launched in 1579.

The dockyard received its first royal visit, from Elizabeth I, in 1573; later, in 1606, James I used Chatham dockyard for a meeting with Christian IV of Denmark.

=== Relocation ===
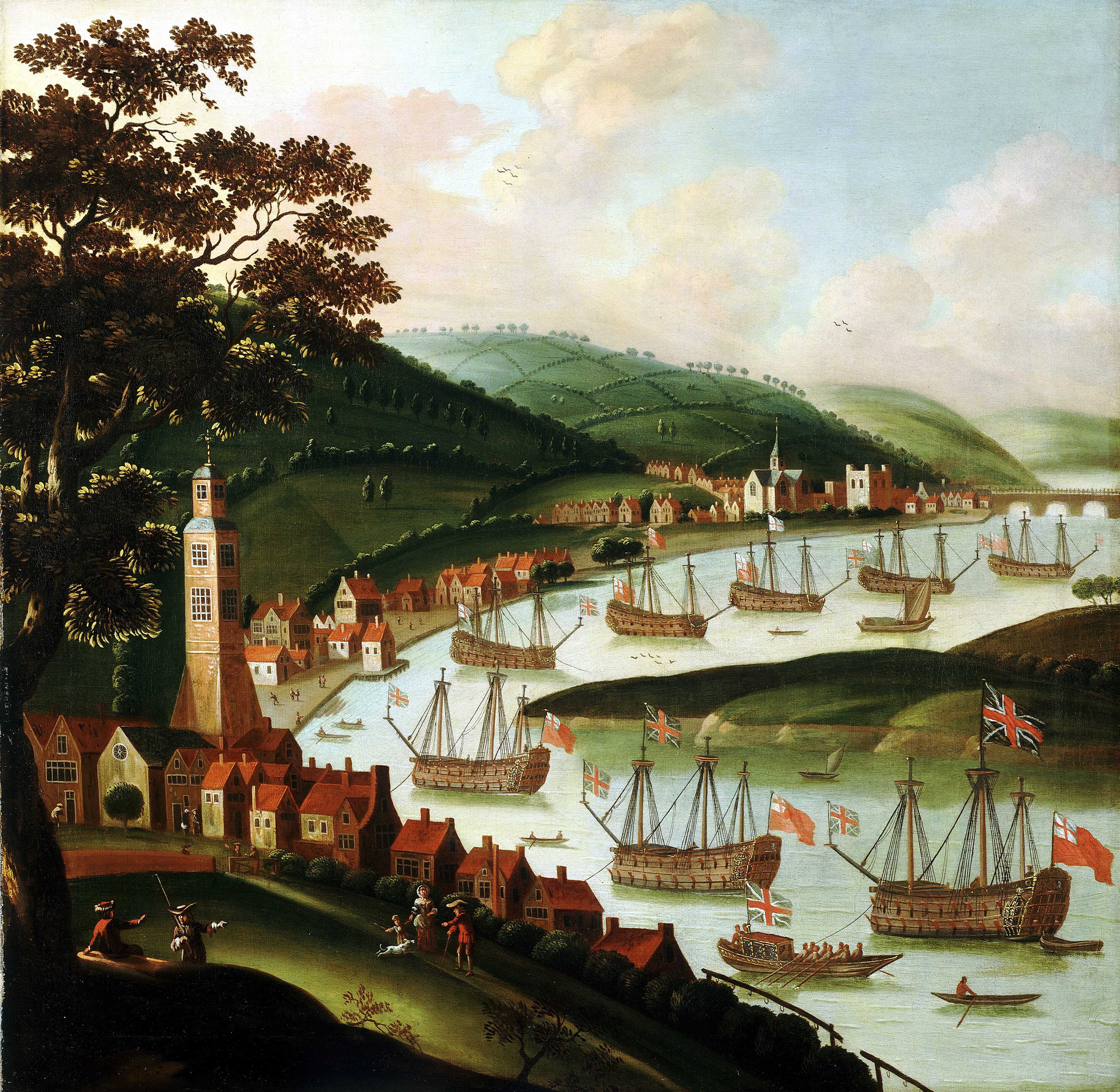
17th-century painting of naval vessels moored on the River Medway, viewed from Chatham with Rochester Bridge in the background.

In the early 17th century the government resolved to invest in a new specialised facility for refitting and repairing warships. By 1611 Chatham had been chosen as its location (in preference to Deptford, which at the time was the nation's principal naval shipbuilding yard; this led to speculation that Deptford was going to be sold off). The decision established Chatham as the country's premier naval industrial complex; nevertheless, concerns were already being raised over its river being prone to silting.

The decision required the dockyard to move from its original location, which was too constricted, to a new (adjacent) site to the north. (The old site was in due course transferred to the Ordnance Board, who established the gun wharf there.) By 1619, the new dockyard consisted of a new dry dock and wharf with storehouses, all enclosed within a brick perimeter wall. The growing importance of the dockyard was illustrated with the addition soon afterwards of a mast pond, and the granting of additional land on which a second (double) dry dock was constructed, along with a sail loft, a ropery and residences for the dockyard officers: all of which were completed by 1624.

Peter Pett, of the family of shipwrights whose history is closely connected to the Chatham dockyard, became commissioner in 1649. In 1686 two new dry docks were built, in addition to the old single and double dry docks; all four were rebuilt and expanded at various points in subsequent centuries (the double dock having been converted into a single dock in 1703). Although the yard focused mainly on refitting and repairs, some shipbuilding continued to take place. It made do with a single shipbuilding slip for much of the 17th century (a second slip, dating from the same period, had fallen out of use; it was replaced in the 1730s). Also in 1686 a 'Great Long Store-house' was built, alongside the ropery on what is now Anchor Wharf; and two new mast ponds were constructed, in what was then the northernmost part of the yard, in 1697 and 1702.

==== Sheerness ====
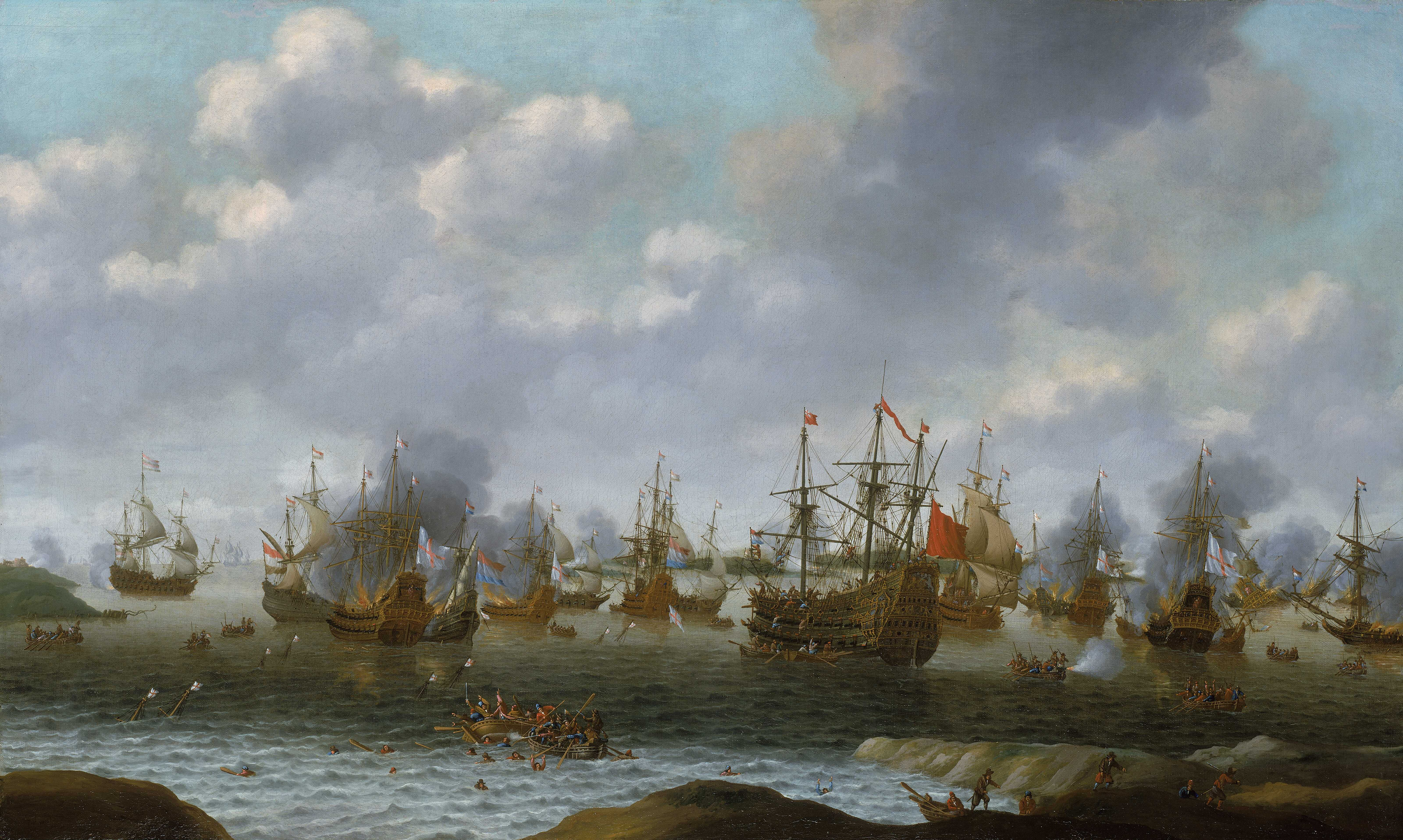
Dutch Attack on the Medway, June 1667 by Pieter Cornelisz van Soest, painted c. 1667. The captured ship Royal Charles is right of centre.

One of the disadvantages of Chatham (and also of the Thames-side yards) was their relative inaccessibility for ships at sea (including those anchored in The Nore). Therefore, rather than risk being constrained by wind, tide and draught on a journey upriver, ships would seek as often as possible to do running repairs and maintenance while at anchor, and would only travel to the dockyard when necessary. Thus deliveries of victuals, ordnance and other supplies were made by small boats, sailing regularly between Chatham and The Nore.

Seeking to alleviate this less-than-satisfactory situation, the Navy Board explored options for developing a shore facility with direct access from the open water of the Thames Estuary. The escalating Anglo-Dutch wars forced their hand, however: several temporary buildings were hastily erected in Sheerness, at the mouth of the Medway, to enable ships to re-arm, re-victual and (if necessary) be repaired as quickly as possible. In 1665, the Navy Board approved Sheerness as a site for a new dockyard, and building work began; but in 1667 the still-incomplete Sheerness Dockyard was captured by the Dutch Navy and used as the base for an attack on the English fleet at anchor in the Medway itself. Sheerness remained operational as a royal dockyard until 1959, but it was never considered a major shore establishment and in several respects it operated as a subsidiary yard to Chatham.

=== Consolidation ===
By the late 17th century a number of prestigious new buildings were erected (including the officers' residences, the clocktower storehouse and the main gatehouse), several of which are still in place. At the same time, the nearby village of Brompton began to be developed to provide housing for the dockyard's growing workforce.

From the very start of the 18th century, however, Chatham began to be superseded in both size and importance, first by Portsmouth, then Plymouth, when the main naval enemy became France, and the Western approaches the chief theatre of operations. In addition, the Medway had begun to silt up, making navigation more difficult (especially as the Navy's ships were getting larger). As a result, it was acknowledged by 1771 that Chatham had no future as a front-line fleet base; nevertheless, following a visit by the Admiralty Board in 1773, the decision was taken to invest further in Chatham, and to develop it as a building yard rather than a refitting base.

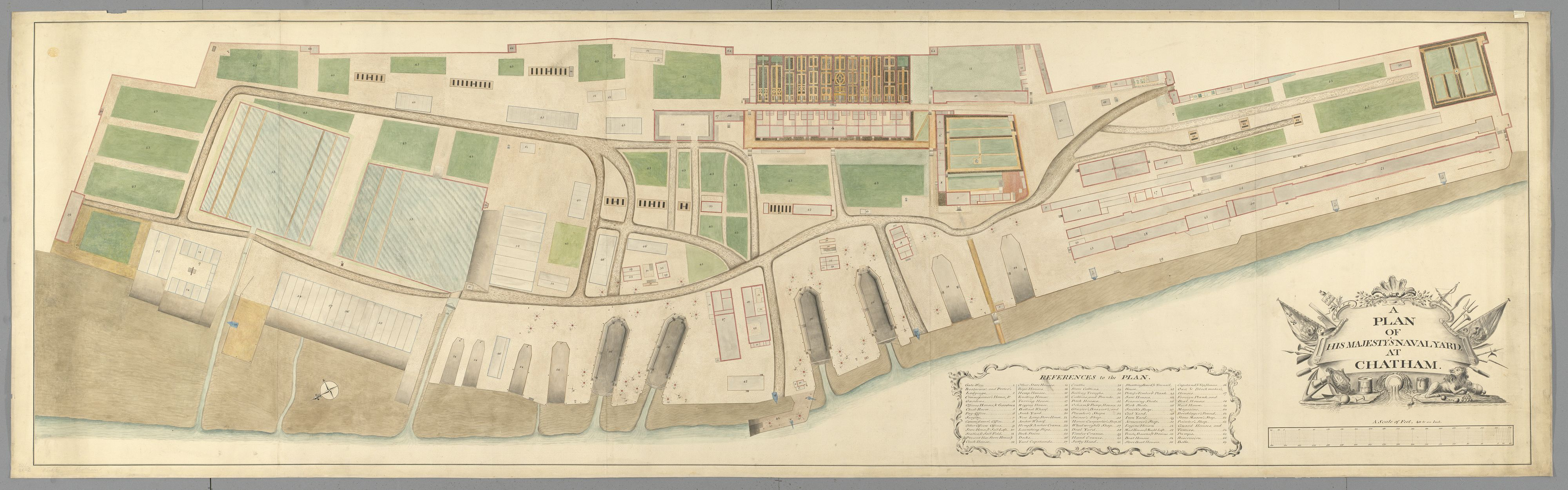
A detailed plan of the Dockyard, published in 1774.

By this time the establishment, including the gun wharf, stretched one mile (1.6 km) in length, and included an area of in excess of 95 acres (380,000 m^{2}). Alongside the four dry docks it now had a total of six shipbuilding slips (equalling Deptford and outnumbering the other yards in this regard), albeit three of the six were under 150 ft (46 m) in length and suitable only for building smaller warships. The docks varied from 160 ft (49 m) to 186 ft (57 m) in length. The officers and men employed in the yard had also increased, and by 1798 they numbered 1,664, including 49 officers and clerks and 624 shipwrights. Additionally required were the blockmakers, caulkers, pitch-heaters, blacksmiths, joiners and carpenters, sail makers, riggers, and ropemakers (274), as well as bricklayers, labourers and others. Building works at Chatham did not compare with the substantial expansions underway at Portsmouth and Plymouth at this time; but the southern part of the yard was significantly redeveloped, with construction of two new storehouses on Anchor Wharf and a major reconfiguration of the ropery.

Among the vessels built in this Dockyard which still exist are HMS Victory (launched in 1765 and now preserved at Portsmouth Historic Dockyard) and HMS Unicorn (a Leda-class frigate), launched in 1824 and now preserved afloat at Dundee).

=== Mechanisation ===
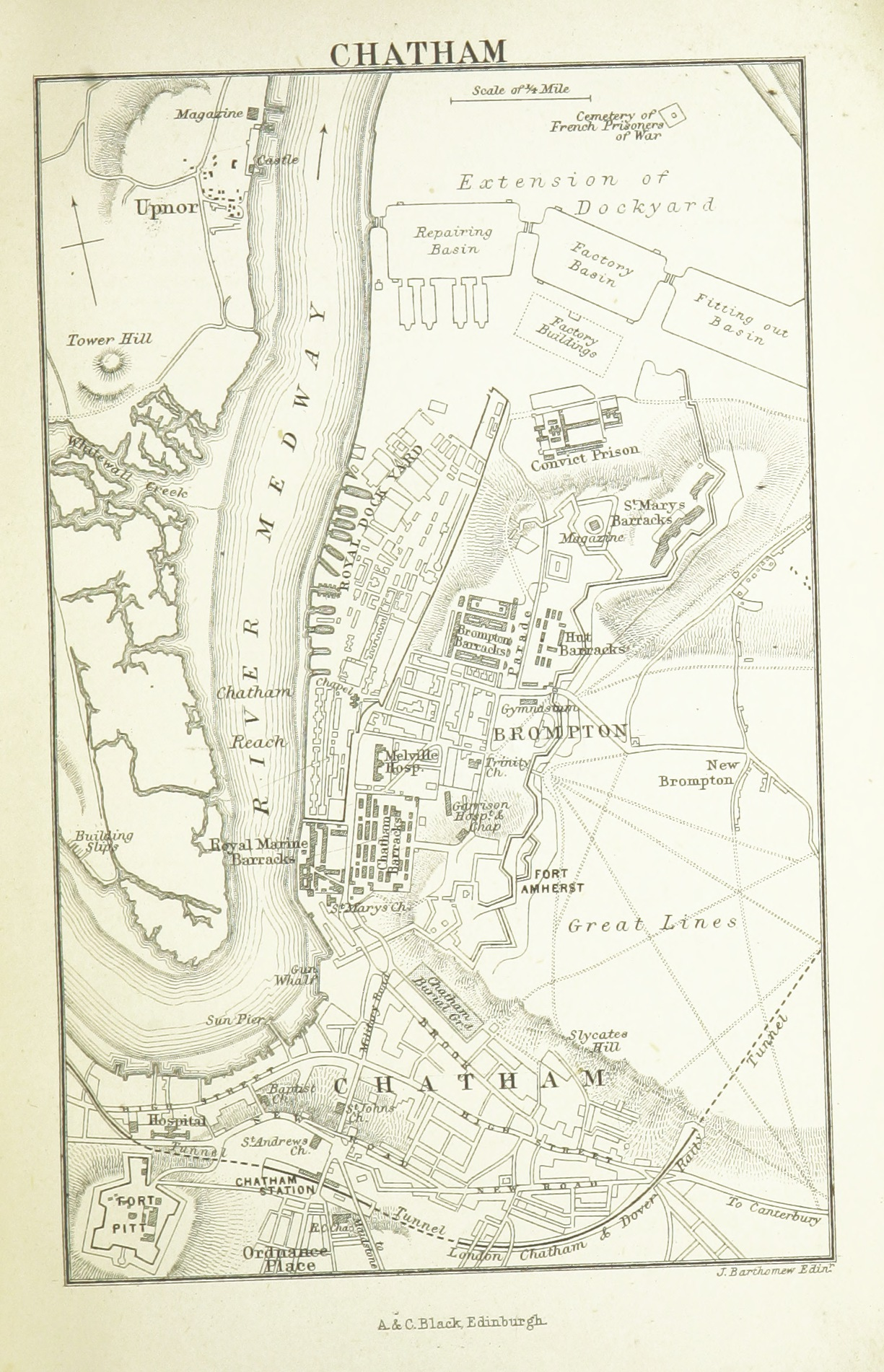
1884 map, showing the 'Royal Dock Yard' (centre) with the river to the west, new extension to the north, barracks and fortifications to the east.

Following the appointment of Robert Seppings as Master Shipwright in 1804, iron began to be introduced into the structure of ships being built at Chatham; the following year work began on a new, much larger smithery, commissioned by Samuel Bentham, designed by Edward Holl and fitted out by John Rennie. Among other things, the use of iron in ship construction enabled larger vessels to be built, and between 1836 and 1851 Chatham gained five new covered slipways, much larger in scale than the ones they replaced. (The covering of Chatham's slipways and dry docks, to protect the woodwork of ships as they were built or repaired, had begun with No.2 Slip and No.1 Dock in 1817).

In 1811, Marc Brunel recommended the installation of steam-powered sawmills in the royal dockyards, to replace the manual labour of the saw pits. Money was only made available for one such installation, however, and Chatham (as the principal building yard at this time) was chosen as its location. Land was purchased to the northeast for its construction, and the new saw mill began operation in 1814. The following year, John Rennie was engaged to build an entirely new dry dock (following his own recommendations) which was the first in the dockyard to be built entirely of stone; it was built on the site of the old smithery. Unlike the earlier timber docks, which were drained using gravity, this new dock (No.3 Dock) was pumped dry using a Boulton & Watt steam engine. After completion of the new dock in 1821, reconstruction of the other docks in stone followed (with the exception of the northernmost, which was converted into a slipway); they were likewise emptied using steam power, provided by the same engine and pumps (which were also linked to a network of pipes installed across the whole dockyard site for firefighting purposes). Another novel application of steam power was embarked on in 1817, with the building of a 'Lead and Paint Mill', in which a single beam engine powered a rolling mill and a series of devices for grinding pigment and mixing paint; the plant was operational from 1819. It was not until 1837, however, that steam power was first introduced into the ropery, and the smithery received its first engine (for blowing the forges and powering tilt hammers) in 1841.

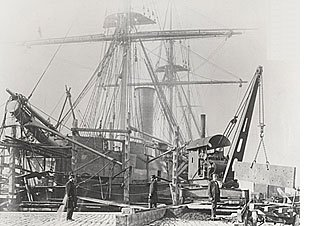
Armour plating being fitted to HMS Royal Oak at Chatham, c. 1862.

At the same time, moves were being made towards the application of steam power to ship propulsion. The first steam-powered ship to be laid down at Chatham was HMS Phoenix, one of four paddle steamers built concurrently across the royal dockyards in the early 1830s, each designed by a different leading shipwright. HMS Bee, launched at Chatham in 1842, was an experimental vessel fitted with both paddles and a propeller, each of which could be driven independently from the same engine for comparison. Following the success of such early trials with screw propulsion, several older sailing ships were taken into dry dock and retro-fitted with propellers, beginning with HMS Horatio. Another hint of changes to come was seen in the launch of HMS Aetna, the first armour-plated vessel to be built at Chatham, in 1856. All these developments were to come together with the construction of HMS Achilles, in a newly expanded No.2 Dock, between 1860 and 1864: the first true iron-hulled battleship to be launched in a royal dockyard.

To meet the new demands of building in iron, metal mills were built alongside the smithery in 1845, containing rolling machinery and furnaces for reprocessing iron. Holl's smithery was itself enlarged with the addition of a foundry in the 1850s, and its courtyard was roofed over for a steam hammer shop in 1865. By 1861, No.1 Dock had been filled in and a machine shop constructed in its place for heating, bending and planing armour plate for HMS Achilles which was being built alongside. For the time being, however, marine steam engines were not manufactured on site but were ordered from Thames-based private contractors (along with other associated equipment). In 1860 the dockyard's policing was also transferred to the new No.4 Division of the Metropolitan Police, which remained in that role until 1932.

=== Expansion ===
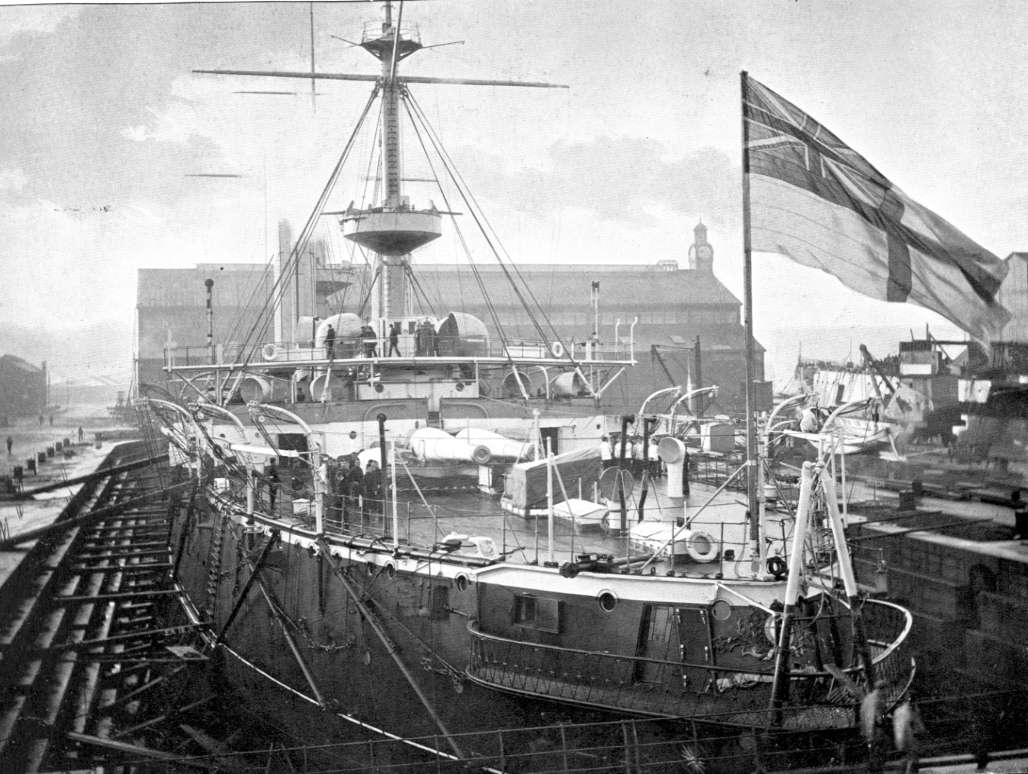
HMS Empress of India in No 8 Dock, with No 1 Boiler Shop in the background, c. 1897.

A significant disadvantage for Chatham was that fitting out had always taken place on the river. When Achilles, for example, had been completed and floated out of dry dock, she spent almost a year moored in Gillingham Reach, where not only her engines, boilers, funnels and a 2.5-long-ton (2.54 t) propeller were fitted, but also masts, sails, rigging, guns, coal, food, ammunition and furnishings were either loaded or installed. It was partly to address this problem that the Admiralty undertook a huge building programme at Chatham. Between 1862 and 1865, the size of the yard quadrupled and provided specialist facilities for steam-powered ships with metal hulls. Three basins were constructed along St. Mary's creek, from west to east: No.1 Basin (of 28 acres (110,000 m^{2})), No.2 Basin (20 acres (81,000 m^{2})) and No.3 Basin (21 acres (85,000 m^{2})). Along the southern edge of No.1 Basin four new dry docks were built (Nos.5–8), each 420 ft (130 m) long. Initially a purpose-built 'steam factory' was planned, but following the closure of Woolwich Dockyard in 1869 a number of slip covers were removed from that site and re-erected at the head of the new dry docks to serve as factories for building and fitting engines and for boilermaking.

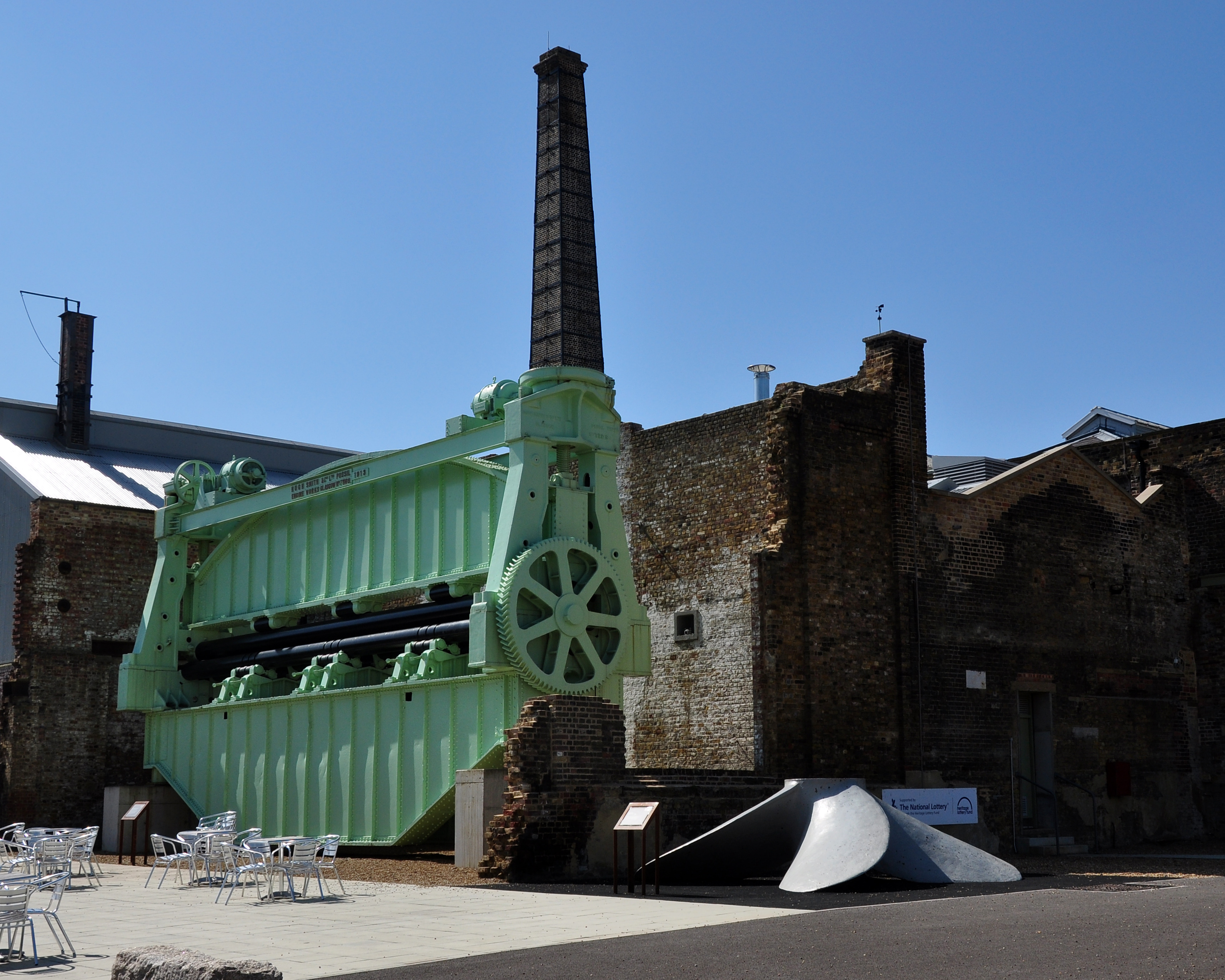
Plate-bending roller, installed in No 5 Machine Shop in 1913 and now preserved at the Historic Dockyard.

No.1 Basin was officially opened in 1871, with HMS Invincible being brought into No.5 Dock for repairs, with great ceremony. Work on the other docks and basins followed, with No.3 Basin finally being completed in 1883. Two years later the project was largely complete, with facilities provided alongside for gun mounting and mast rigging, as well as a victualling depot and a coaling area. Much of the excavation and building work had been done by convict labour (the Chatham Convict Prison having been built to the north of the dockyard, with the expansion project in mind, in 1853). In 1897 a naval barracks was built on the site of the prison to provide crew accommodation for ships anchored in The Nore; for the next sixty years it served as the headquarters of Nore Command, whose Commander-in-Chief was accommodated in the adjacent Admiralty House.

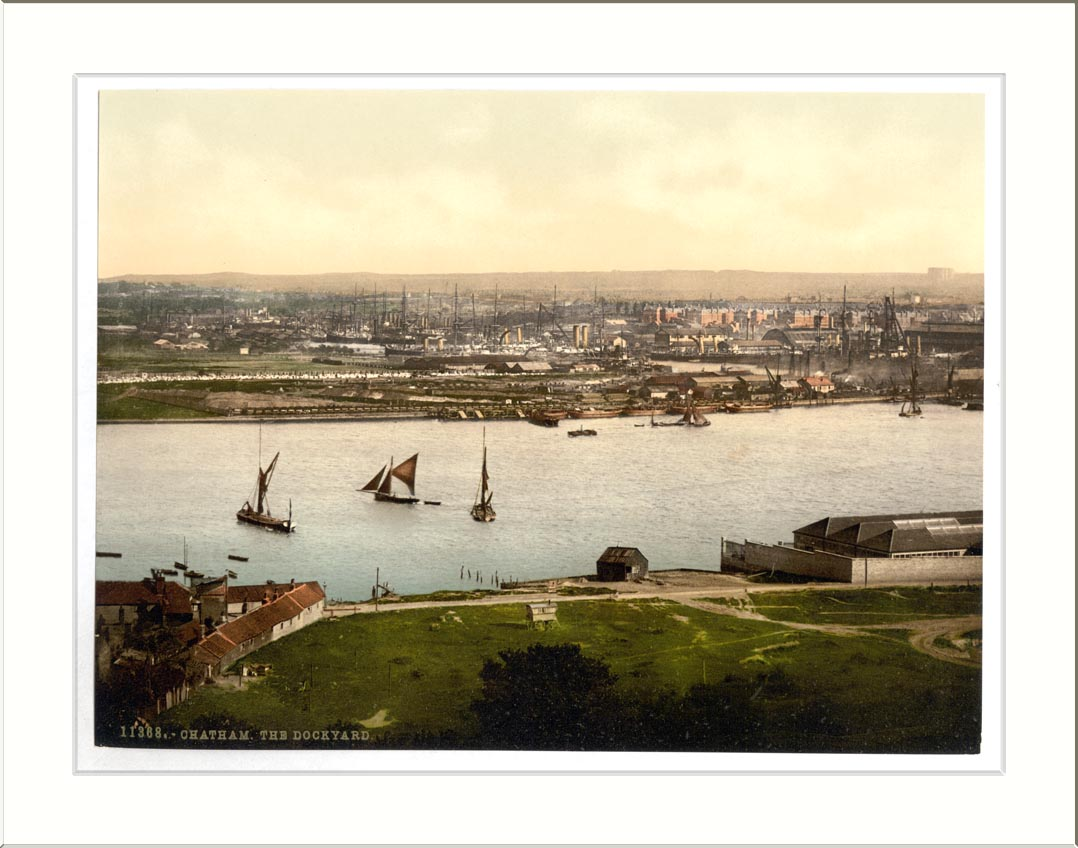
The Dockyard extension viewed from Upnor, c.1910.

In 1897 a new, even longer dry dock was opened on the north side of No.1 Basin: at its opening, this (No.9 Dock) was the largest in the world at 650 ft (200 m) long by 84 ft (26 m) wide. At around the same time, in the older part of the dockyard, No.7 Slip was extended to accommodate the building of HMS Prince of Wales (launched in 1902), and a new (uncovered) slipway was built a little to the north (No.8 Slip, completed in 1900); at 616 ft (188 m) this was one of the longest slips in the world and was designed for building battleships. (The older slipways, by contrast, were proving much too small and they were mostly filled in around this time, their covered areas being put to alternative uses.) The first battleship to be built on the new No.8 Slip was HMS Africa, launched in 1905; however it also proved to be the last, as it was announced (controversially) that Chatham Dockyard would be unable to accommodate Dreadnoughts. Proposals were made for a fourth Basin of 57 acres (230,000 m^{2}), together with additional large docks of up to 800 ft (240 m), to cover the remaining land on St Mary's Island; but these were soon superseded by plans to build an entirely new dockyard at Rosyth.

Nevertheless, Light cruisers and other smaller vessels continued to be built at Chatham during the first half of the 20th century. Also with the 20th century came the submarine. The first submarine to be built at a royal dockyard was HMS C17, launched from the covered No.7 Slip in 1908 and then fitted out in No.2 Dock; five more of the same class followed, C18, C19, C20, C33 and C34. During World War I, twelve submarines were built here, but when hostilities ceased, uncompleted boats were scrapped and five years passed before a further ship was launched. In the interwar years, eight S-class submarines as well as X1 were built at Chatham but this was a period of decline. Production ramped up during World War II with HMS's Umpire, Una, Splendid, Sportsman, Shalimar, Tradewind, Trenchant, Turpin, Thermopylae and Acheron being constructed.

=== Last years ===
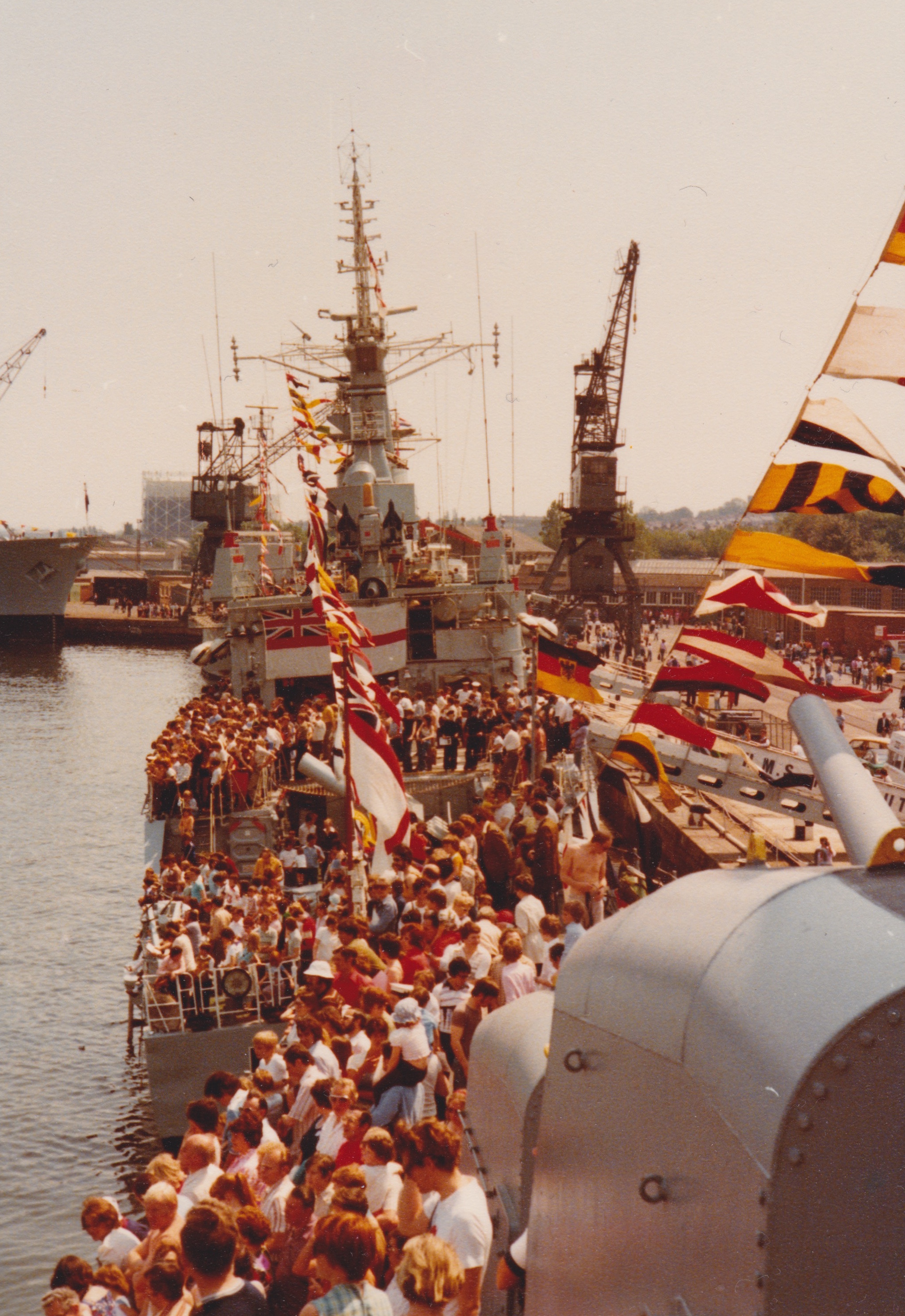
Navy Day at HMNB Chatham, c.1977

In February 1958 it was announced in Parliament that Sheerness Dockyard would close in 1960, with Nore Command (and its Chatham-based Commander-in-Chief) to be abolished the following year. At the same time, it was made clear that at Chatham "the dockyard will be retained; but the barracks and other naval establishments will be closed". (In the event, the barracks were reprieved and repurposed rather than being closed at this stage.)

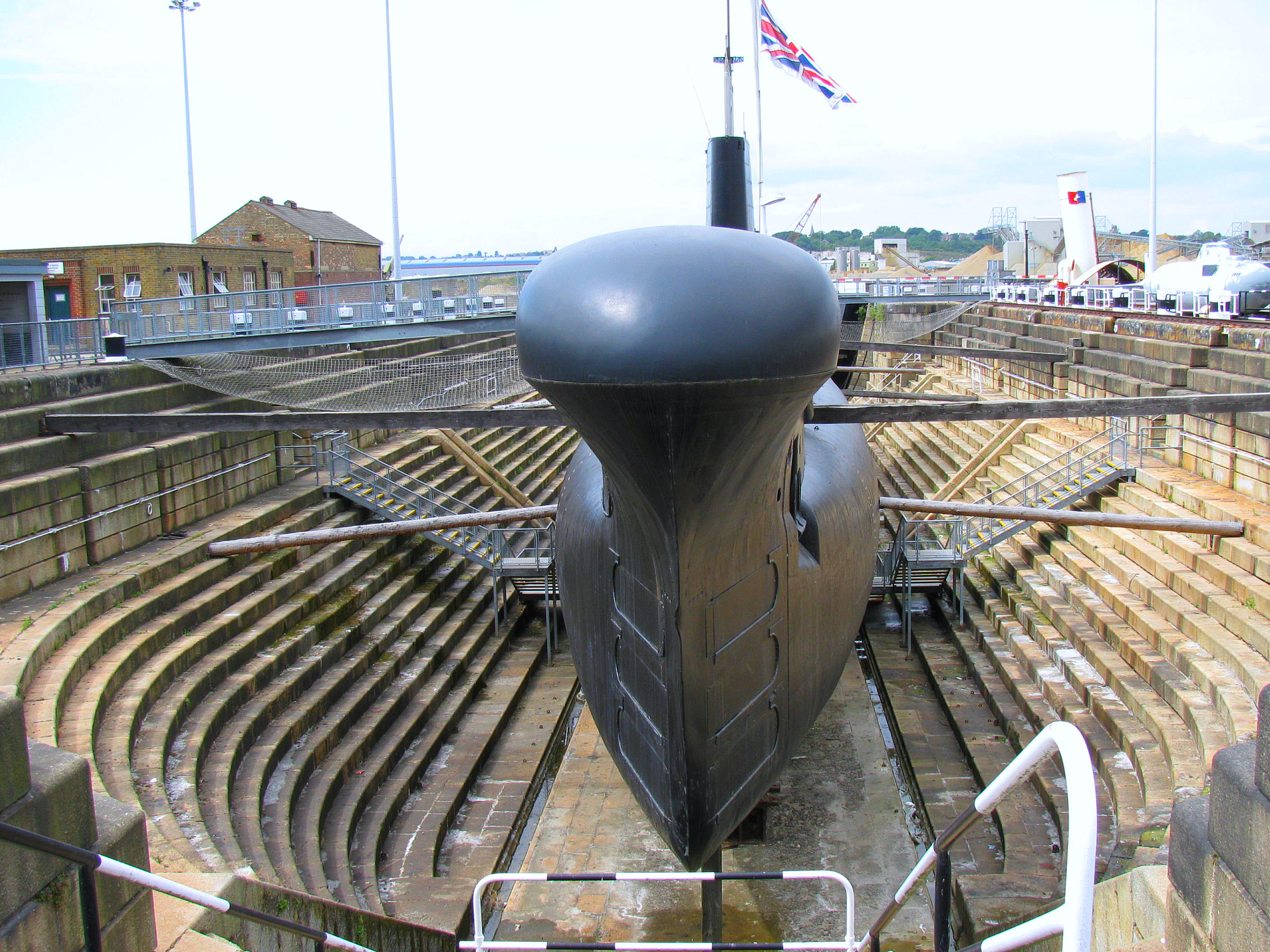
Rennie's No 3 Dock of 1816–21; today it contains HMS Ocelot, the last Royal Navy vessel built at Chatham.

The final boats constructed in Chatham were Oberon-class submarines – Ocelot was the last vessel built for the Royal Navy, and the final vessel was Okanagan built for the Royal Canadian Navy and launched on 17 September 1966. In 1968, a nuclear submarine refitting complex was built between Nos 6 and 7 dry docks, complete with refuelling cranes and health physics building. In spite of this in June 1981, it was announced to Parliament that the dockyard would be run down and closed in 1984.

==== Closure ====
The closure of Chatham Dockyard (along with the adjacent Naval Barracks) was announced in Parliament in June 1981 and scheduled to take place in 1984. Redundancy notices were served, but then abruptly withdrawn following the 1982 invasion of the Falkland Islands; the dockyard was heavily involved in preparing ships for the South Atlantic, and in repairing damaged vessels on their return. Nonetheless, the dockyard closed, as planned, on 31 March 1984.

=== Regeneration ===
At the time of its closure the dockyard covered 400 acres (1.6 km^{2}). Thereafter this was divided into three sections:

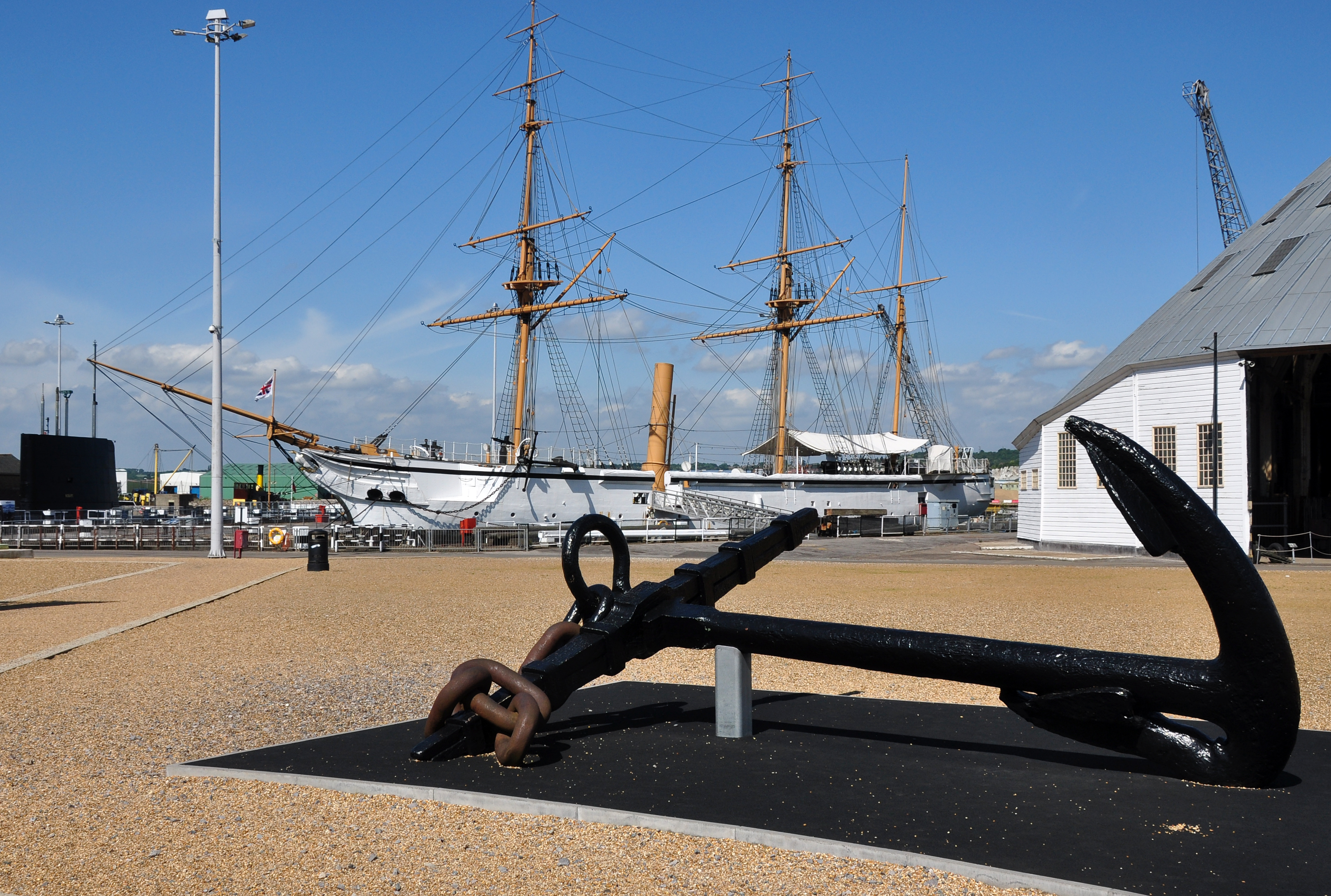
HMS Gannet at Chatham Historic Dockyard

80 acres (0.32 km^{2}), the 18th century core of the site, was transferred to a charity called the Chatham Historic Dockyard Trust. The Georgian site is now a visitor attraction under the care of the Trust: Chatham Historic Dockyard. The Trust is preparing an application for the dockyard and its defences to become a World Heritage Site.

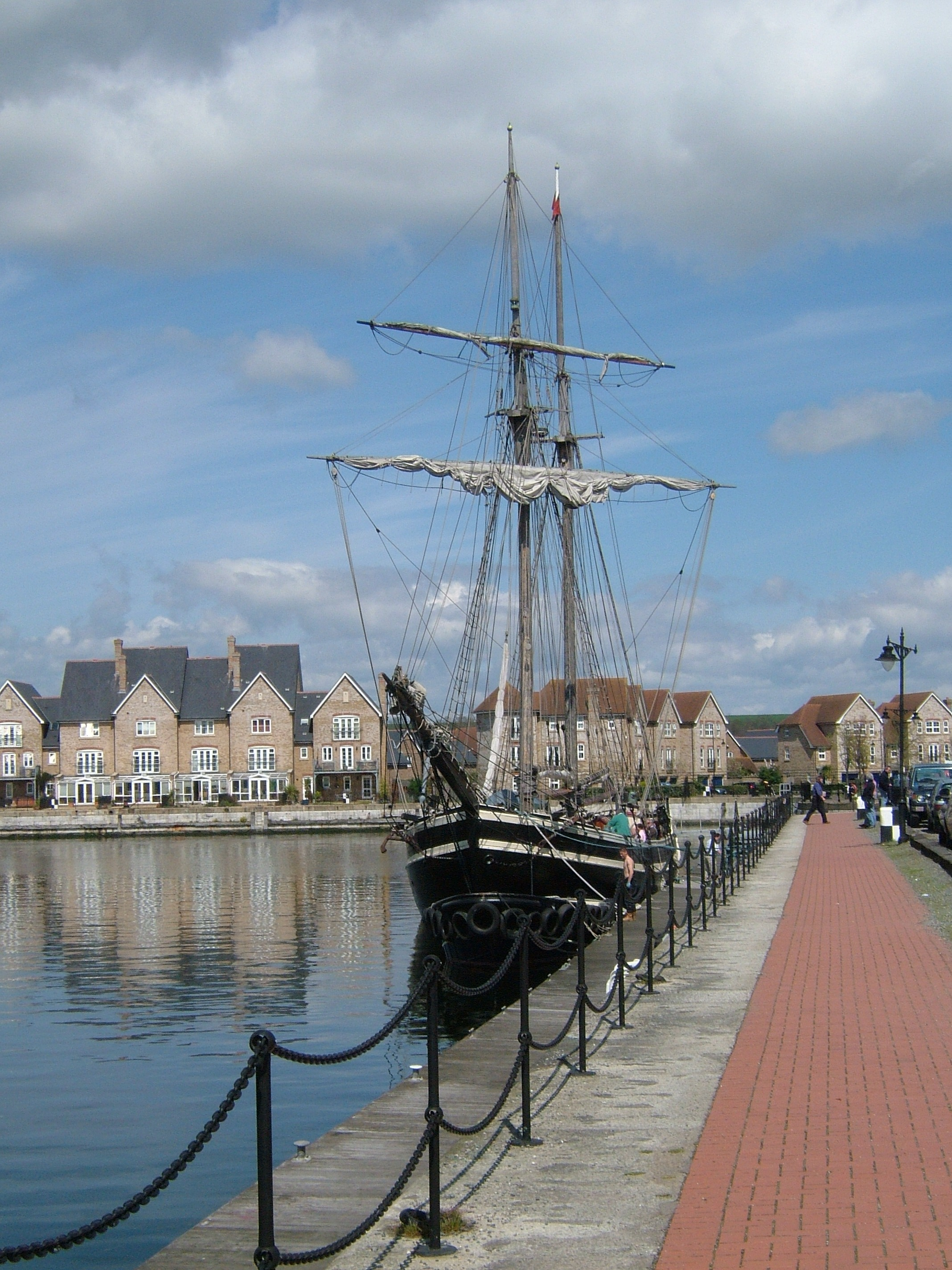
The topsail schooner Julia visiting the middle basin in 2006; behind her is the St Mary's Island housing estate

The easternmost basin (Basin No.3) was handed over to the Medway Ports authority and is now a commercial port (Chatham Docks). It includes Papersafe UK and Nordic Recycling Ltd. In 2013 Peel Ports, which owns and runs Chatham Docks, announced that it was set to convert a 26-acre (0.11 km^{2}) portion of the commercial port into a mixed-use development (incorporating offices, an education facility, apartments, town houses and a food store (Asda), as well as landscaped public areas). The development is called "Chatham Waters". In 2019 Peel announced that Chatham Docks would close in 2025 with the loss of 800 jobs.

The remaining 350 acres (1.4 km^{2}) were transferred to the government's urban regeneration agency (later English Partnerships). Under its remit, the westernmost (No.1) Basin was turned into a marina, part of the former factory area to the south was transformed into an entertainment and retail complex ('Chatham Maritime') and the former Barracks (HMS Pembroke) became Universities at Medway. St Mary's Island, a 150-acre (0.61 km^{2}), largely undeveloped area to the north of the three basins, was transformed into a residential community for some 1,500 homes. It has several themed areas with traditional maritime buildings, a fishing (though in looks only) village with its multi-coloured houses and a modern energy-efficient concept. Many homes have views of the River Medway. A primary school (St. Mary's C of E) and a medical centre provide facilities for the residents and there are attractive walks around the Island.

==== Filming ====
Chatham Dockyard has become a popular location for filming, due to its varied and interesting areas such as the cobbled streets, church and over 100 buildings dating from the Georgian and Victorian periods. Productions that have chosen to film at Chatham Dockyard include: Les Misérables, Call the Midwife, Mr Selfridge, Sherlock Holmes: A Game of Shadows, Oliver Twist, The World Is Not Enough and Grantchester.

== Detailed descriptions ==
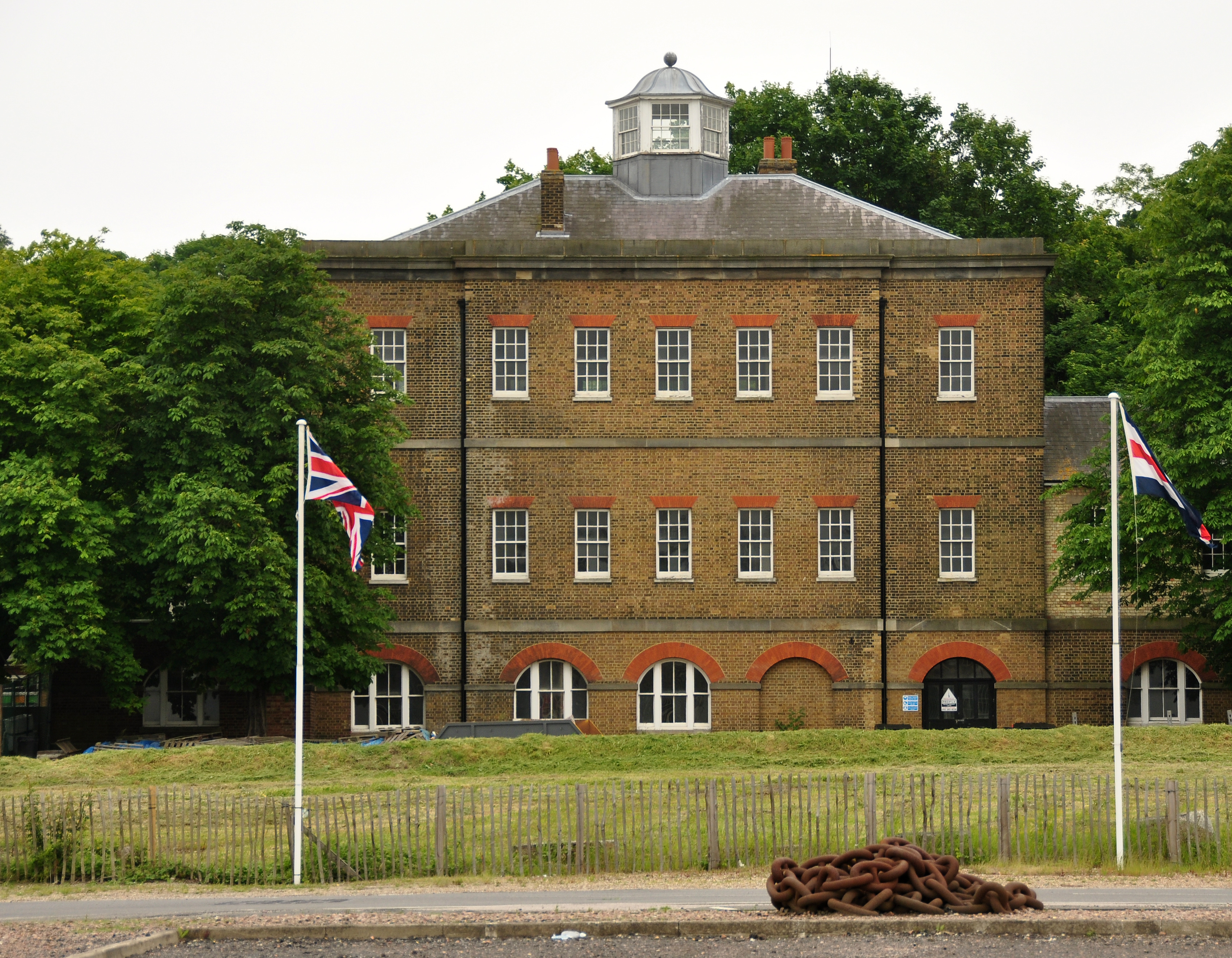
Police Section House, one of the Dockyard's many listed buildings

=== Significant buildings within the Georgian Dockyard ===
==== Wood and canvas ====
- The Mast Ponds. 1697, 1702. Fir logs were seasoned by immersing them in salt water while the sap died back.
  - South Mast Pond, 1697. Now a car park.
  - North Mast Pond, 1702. The ponds were connected by canal.
- Clocktower building 1723. The oldest surviving naval storehouse in any Royal Dockyard. The building functioned as a "present use store" except for the upper floor, which was a mould loft, and six bays at the northern end of the ground floor, which were open and contained saw pits. The upper floors had timber cladding until 1802 when it was replaced by brick. In the 20th century the building was used for offices; it was adapted in 1996–1997 to become the University of Kent's Bridge Warden's College.
- Sail and Colour Loft 1723. Constructed from timber recycled from warships probably from the Dutch Wars. Lower floors were for storage, and the upper floor is a large open space for sail construction. In 1758 there were 45 sailmakers. They sewed 2 ft (0.61 m) strips of canvas into the sails using 170–190 stitches per yard (5 stitches per inch), remembering that there would be two rows of stitching to each seam. Flags denoting nationality and for signals were made here. The flags used by Nelson in his "England expects..." message would have been made here. Flag-making continued here, even after the closure of the dockyard, until 2001.
- House Carpenter's Workshop c. 1740 House carpenters and joiners were responsible for the fittings and furnishings of warships, and also for building and maintaining various structures within the dockyard itself. The small courtyard to the west contained workshops.
- Masthouses and Mouldloft 1753–1755. Grade I listed since August 1999. These were used to make and store masts. Here there are seven interlinking masthouses; they were originally connected to the adjacent South Mast Pond by a wide slipway. Above them is the mould loft where the lines of HMS Victory were laid down: the lines of each frame of a ship would be taken from the plan and scribed, full size, into the floor by shipwrights; from this, patterns or moulds would be built using softwoods, and from these the actual frames would be built and shaped. This building houses the "Wooden Walls Exhibition".
- Timber Seasoning Sheds 1774. These were built to a standard design with bays 45 by 20 feet (13.7 by 6.1 m). These are the first standardised industrial buildings. There were 75 bays erected at Chatham Dockyard, to hold three years worth of timber.
- Wheelwrights' shop circa 1780. This three bay building was originally built as a mast house using timber "reclaimed" from dismantled ships. The east bay was used by the wheelwrights, who constructed and repaired the wheels on the dockyard carts, and may have made ships' wheels. The middle bay was used by the pump makers and the coak and treenail makers. Pumps were simple affairs, made of wood with iron and leather fittings. Coaks were the bearings in pulley blocks, and treenails were the long oak pins, made on a lathe (or 'moot'), that were used to pin the planking to the frames. The west bay was used by the capstan makers, capstans were used to raise the anchor. Since 2017 this building has been linked to the Masthouses and Mouldloft (qv) by a new entrance building for Chatham Historic Dockyard.
- Joiners' Shop c. 1790 originally to make treenails, but later used by the yards joiners. The Resolute Desk (the Oval Office desk) was constructed here by Dockyard Joiners from the timbers of HMS Resolute.
- Brunel Saw Mill 1814. Until 1814 timber was cut by pairs of men, one above and one below the log. In 1758, there were 43 pairs of sawyers working in the yard. In 1812, the sawmill was designed by Marc Brunel, father of Isambard Kingdom Brunel. The mill was driven by steam. The mill was linked to the mast ponds by a mechanical timber transport system, and underground canals. Later the basement was converted into a steam laundry.
- Lower Boat House circa 1820 built as a storehouse for squared timber, and later to store ship's boats.
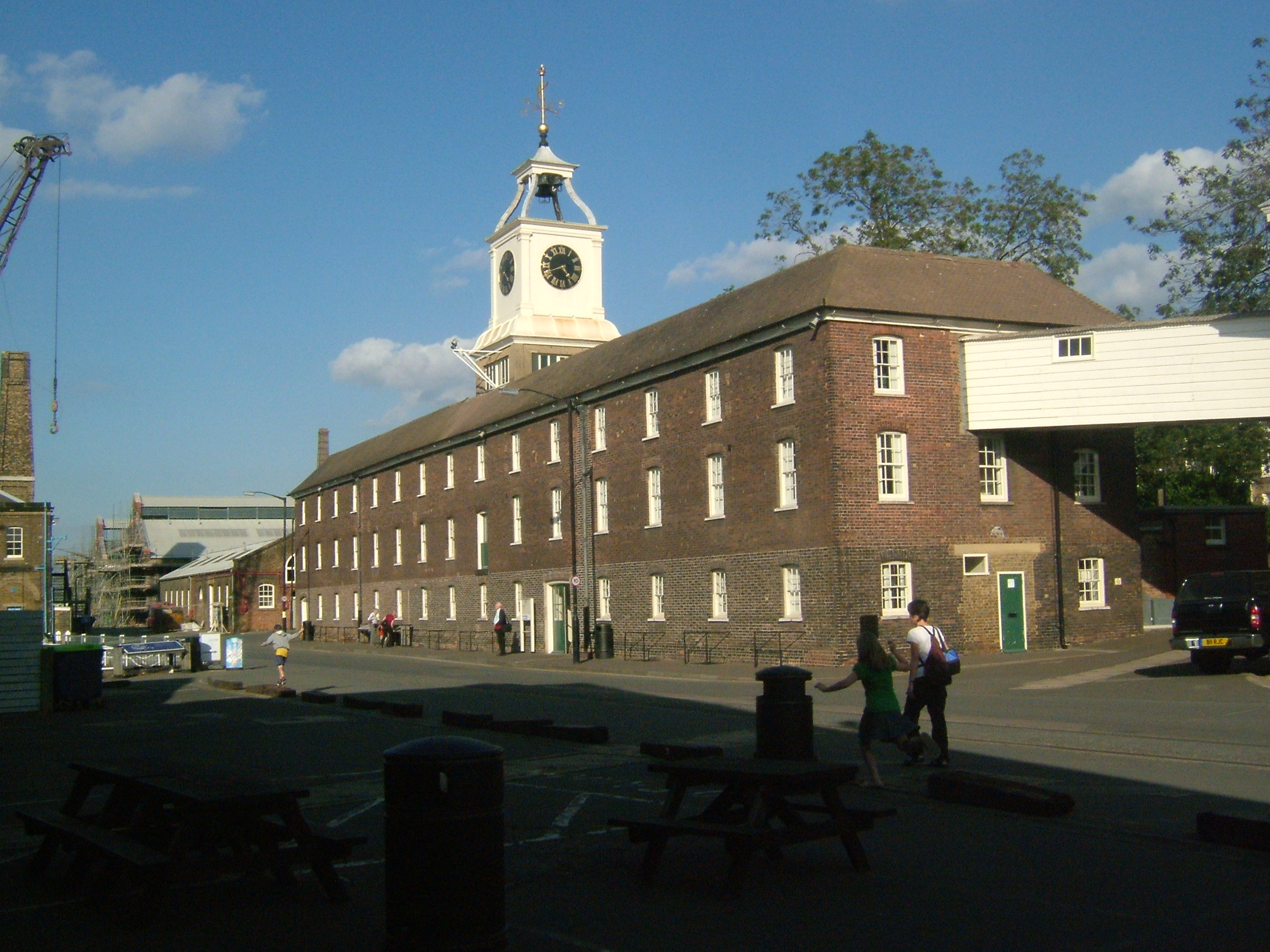
The Clocktower Building

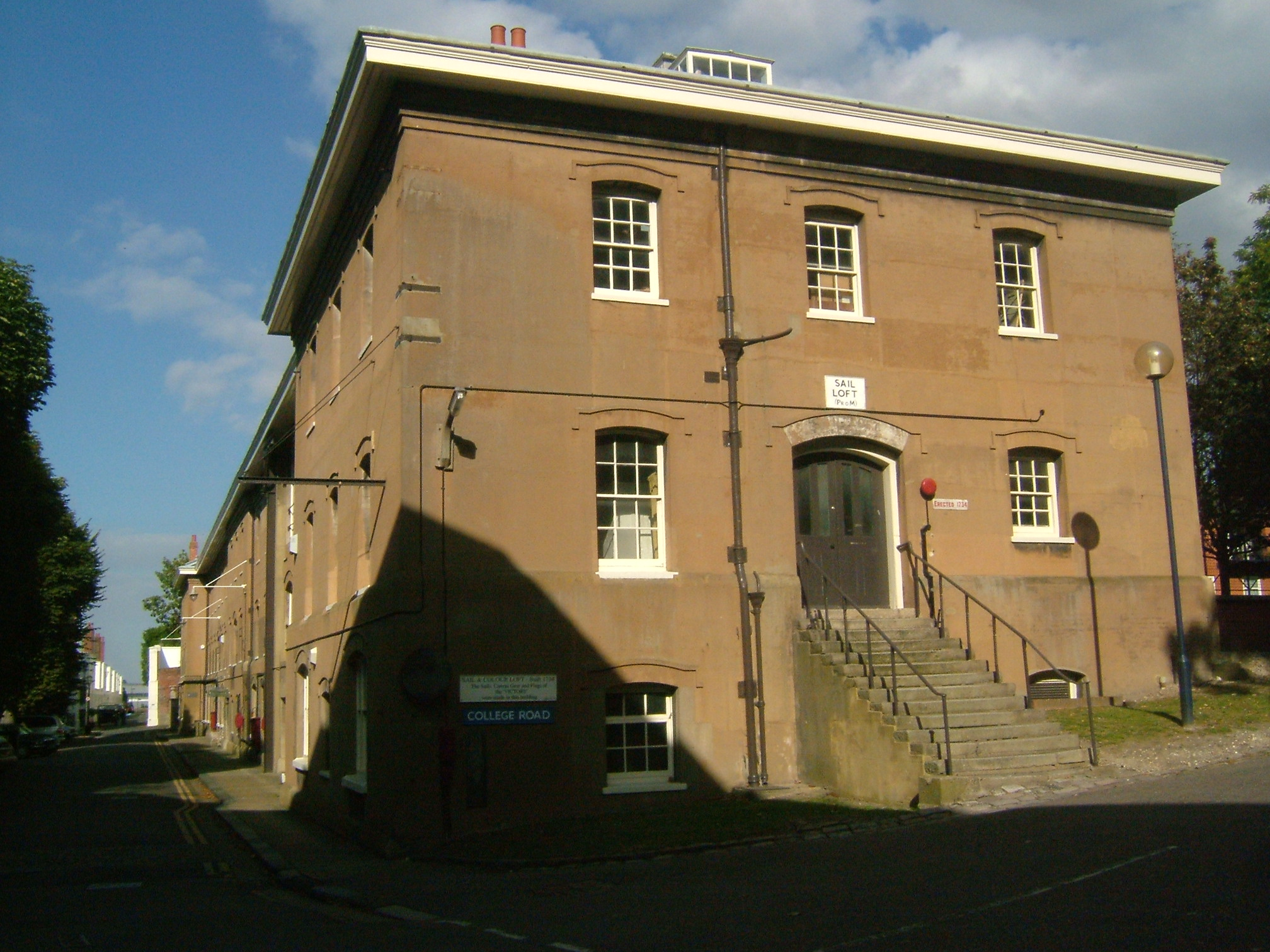
Sail and Colour Loft

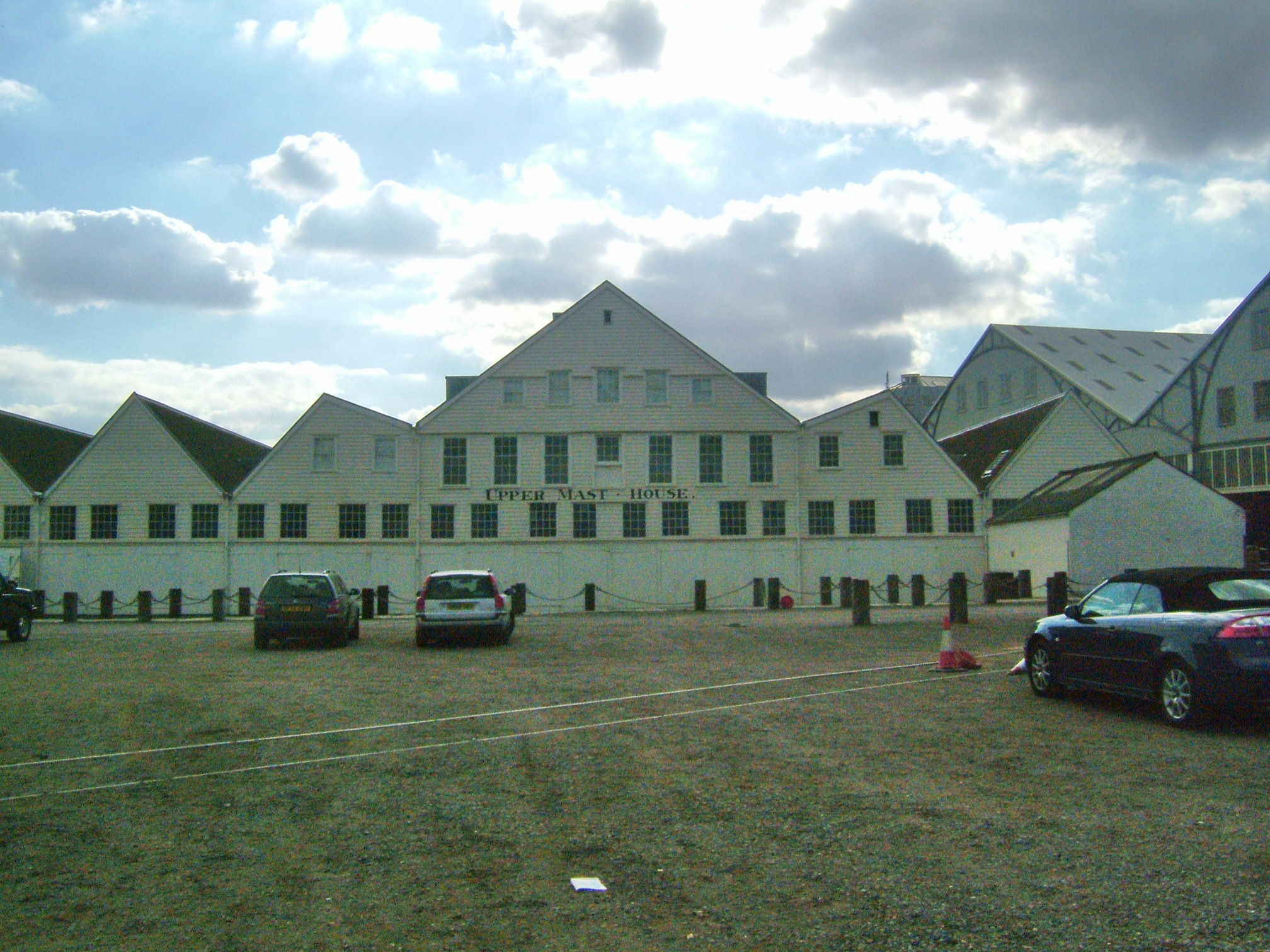
Masthouses and Mould Loft

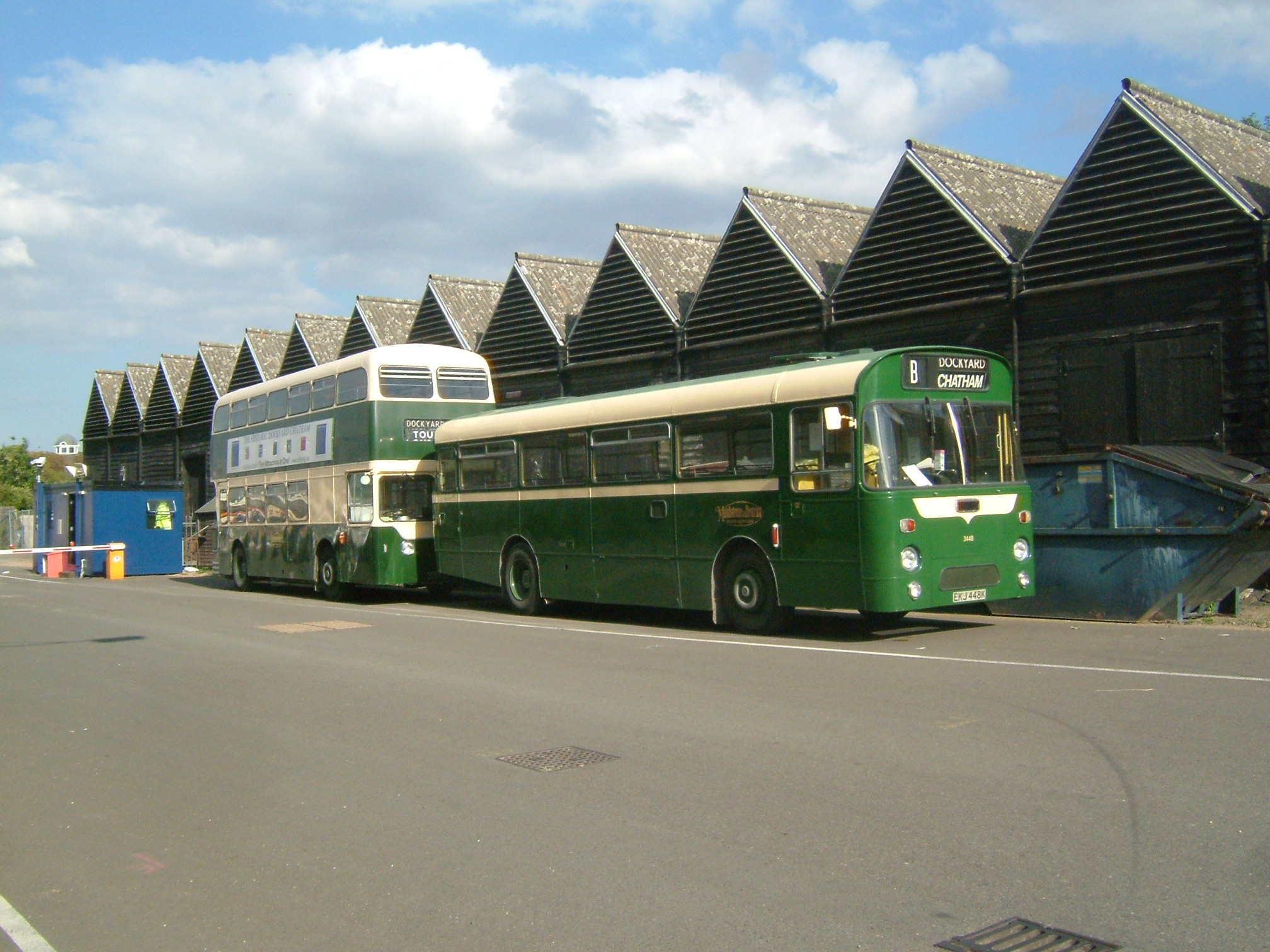
Timber Seasoning sheds

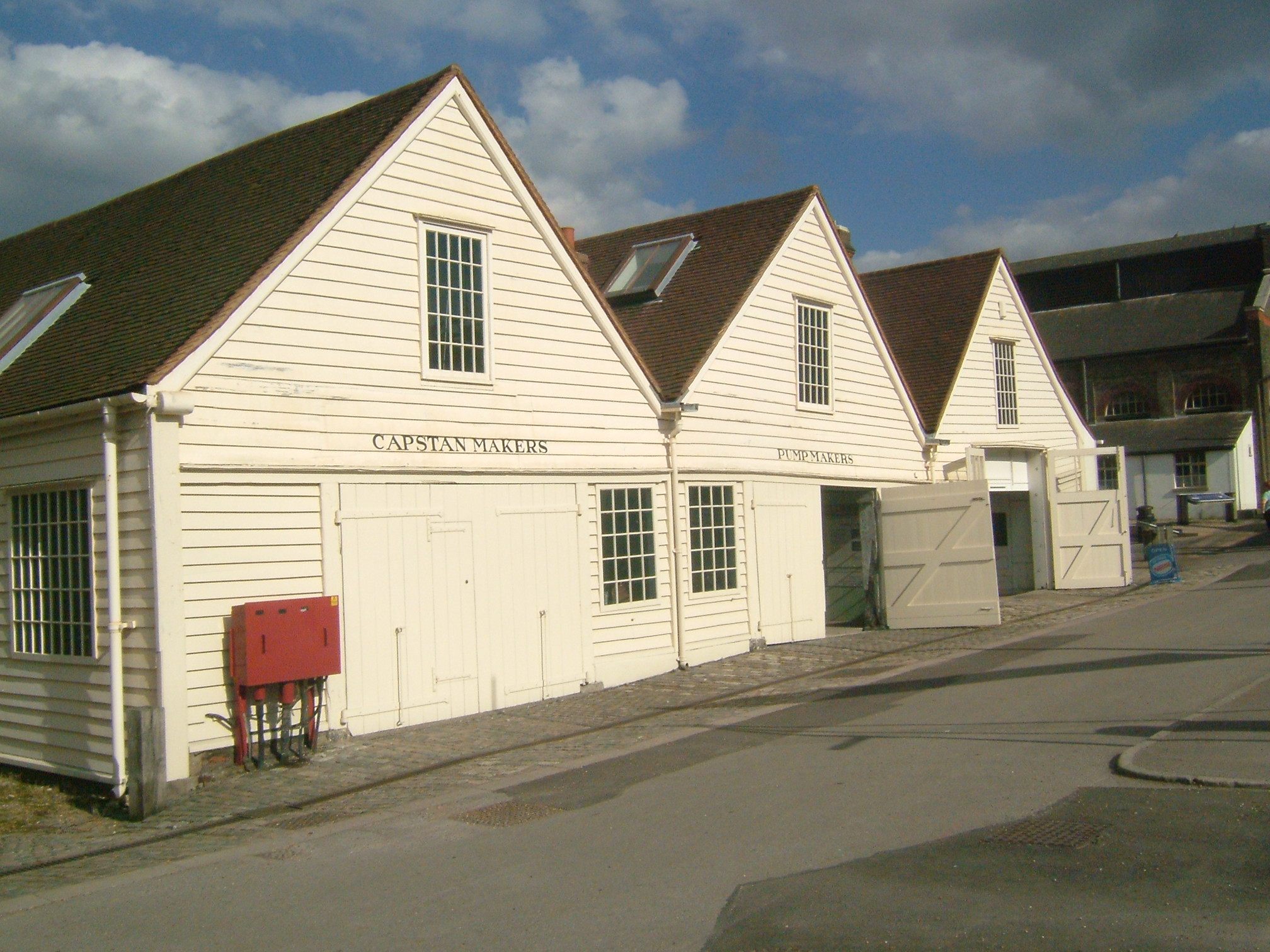
Wheelwrights' shop

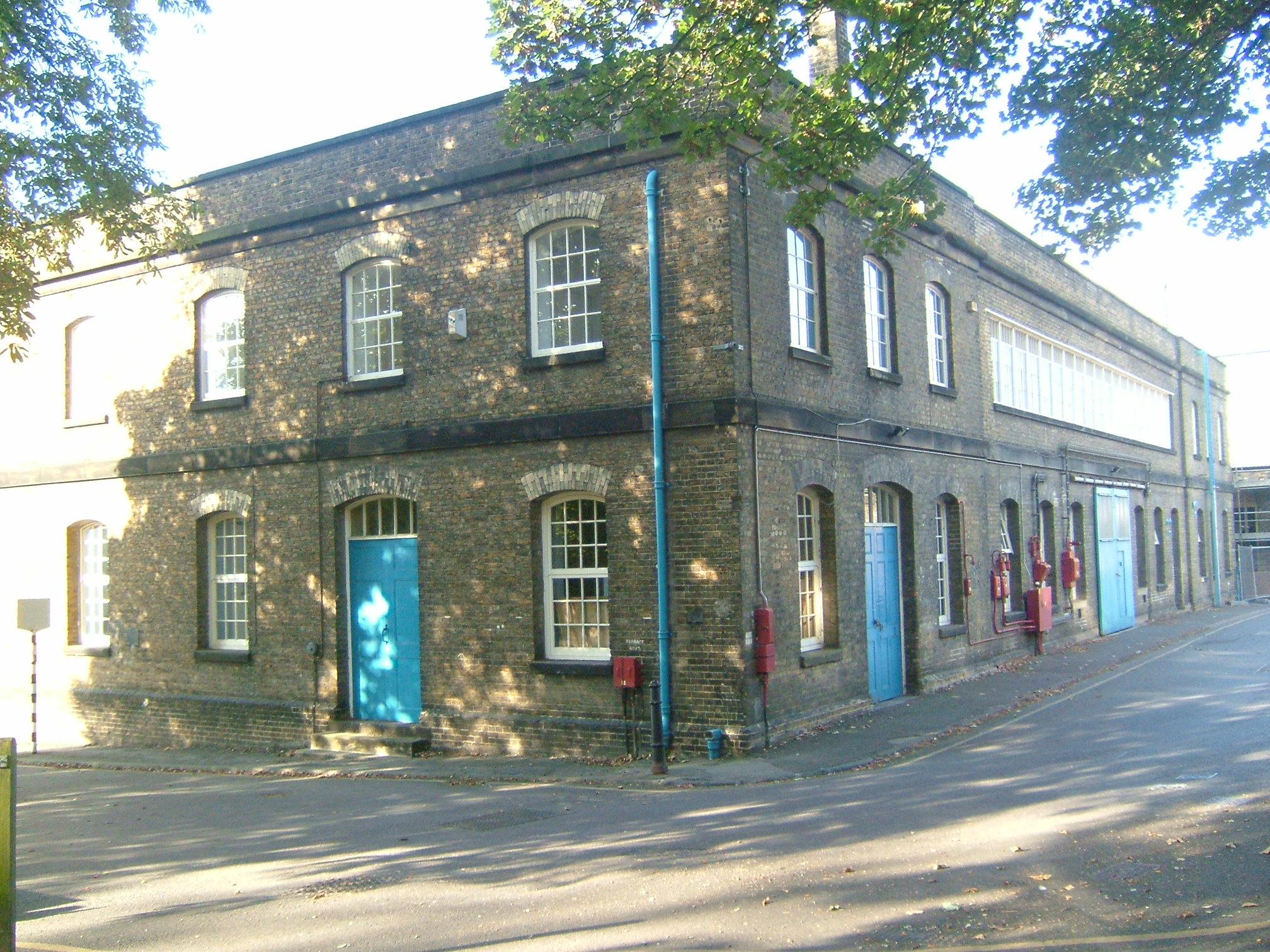
Joiners' Shop

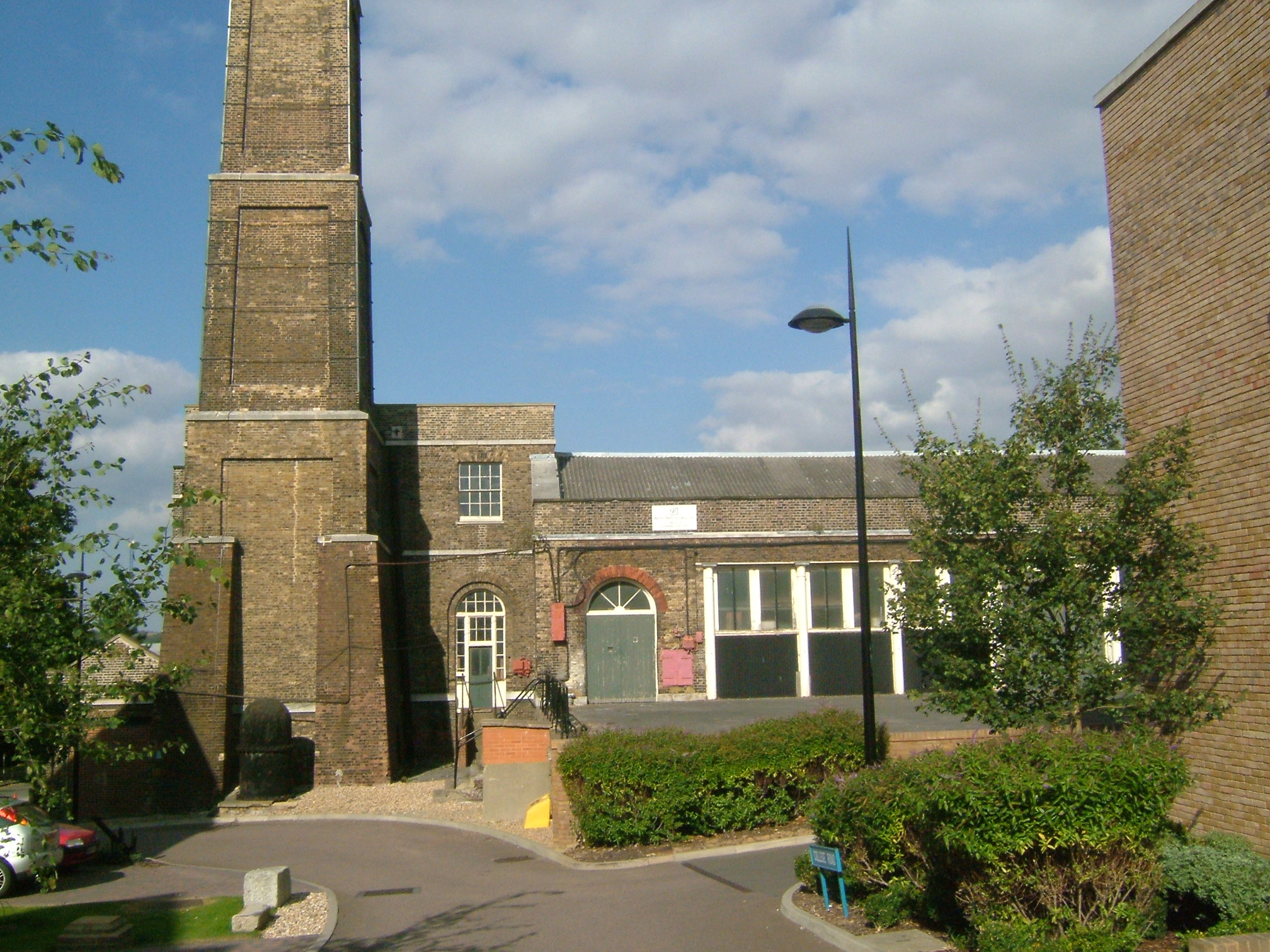
Brunel Sawmill

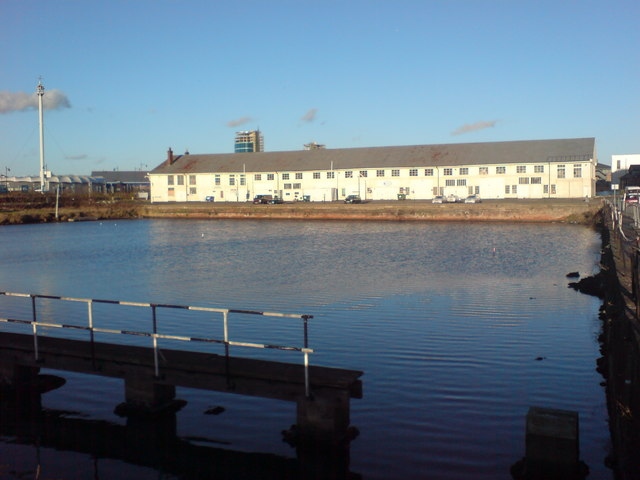
Lower Boat House and North Mast Pond

==== Dry docks and covered slips ====
- The covered slips 1838–1855. It was on slipways that ships were built. The slipways were covered, to prevent ships rotting before they had been launched. The earliest covered slips no longer exist (Nos 1 and 2 Slips, which stood either side of the Assistant Queen's Harbourmaster's Office, were given wooden covers in 1817). By 1838 the use of cast and wrought iron in buildings had become feasible. Of those that survive, the oldest slip has a wooden roof, three have cast iron roofing and the latest uses wrought iron; together, they are of unique importance in showing the development of wide span structures such as were later used by the railways.
  - No 3 Slip 1838. This had a linked timber roof truss structure and was originally covered in tarred paper, which was quickly replaced with a zinc roof. The slip was backfilled around 1900 and a steel mezzanine floor was added. It became a store house for ship's boats.
  - No 4, 5 and 6 Slips 1848. These were designed by Captain Thomas Mould, Royal Engineers, and erected by Bakers and Sons of Lambeth. Similar structures were erected at Portsmouth but these are no longer extant. They predate the London train sheds of Paddington and King's Cross which were often cited as the country's first wide span metal structures.
  - No 7 Slip is one of the earliest examples of a modern metal trussed roof. It was designed in 1852 by Colonel Godfrey T. Green, Royal Engineers. It was used for shipbuilding until 1966; HMS Ocelot was launched from there on 5 May 1962.
- Dry Dock. The docks are filled by sluice gates set into the caissons, and emptied by a series of underground culverts connected to the pumping station. No 1 Dry Dock 1824 (built on the site of "The Old Double Dock") no longer exists; it was filled in and converted into a covered workshop (No 1 Machine Shop) prior to the pioneering construction of HMS Achilles in the adjacent No 2 Dock.
  - No 2 Dry Dock 1856 was built on the site of "The Old Single Dock" where HMS Victory was constructed. In 1863, this dock constructed HMS Achilles, the first iron battleship to be built in a Royal Dockyard. It now houses HMS Cavalier.
  - No 3 Dry Dock 1820, the first to be constructed of stone, was designed by John Rennie. It now houses HMS Ocelot.
  - No 4 Dry Dock 1840 was built on the site of one of a parallel pair of docks built in 1686 (the second of which was converted into the adjacent slipway, No. 3 Slip). It now houses HMS Gannet.
- South Dock Pumping Station 1822, designed by John Rennie. It originally housed a beam engine, which was replaced by an electric pump in 1920. The building is still in use.
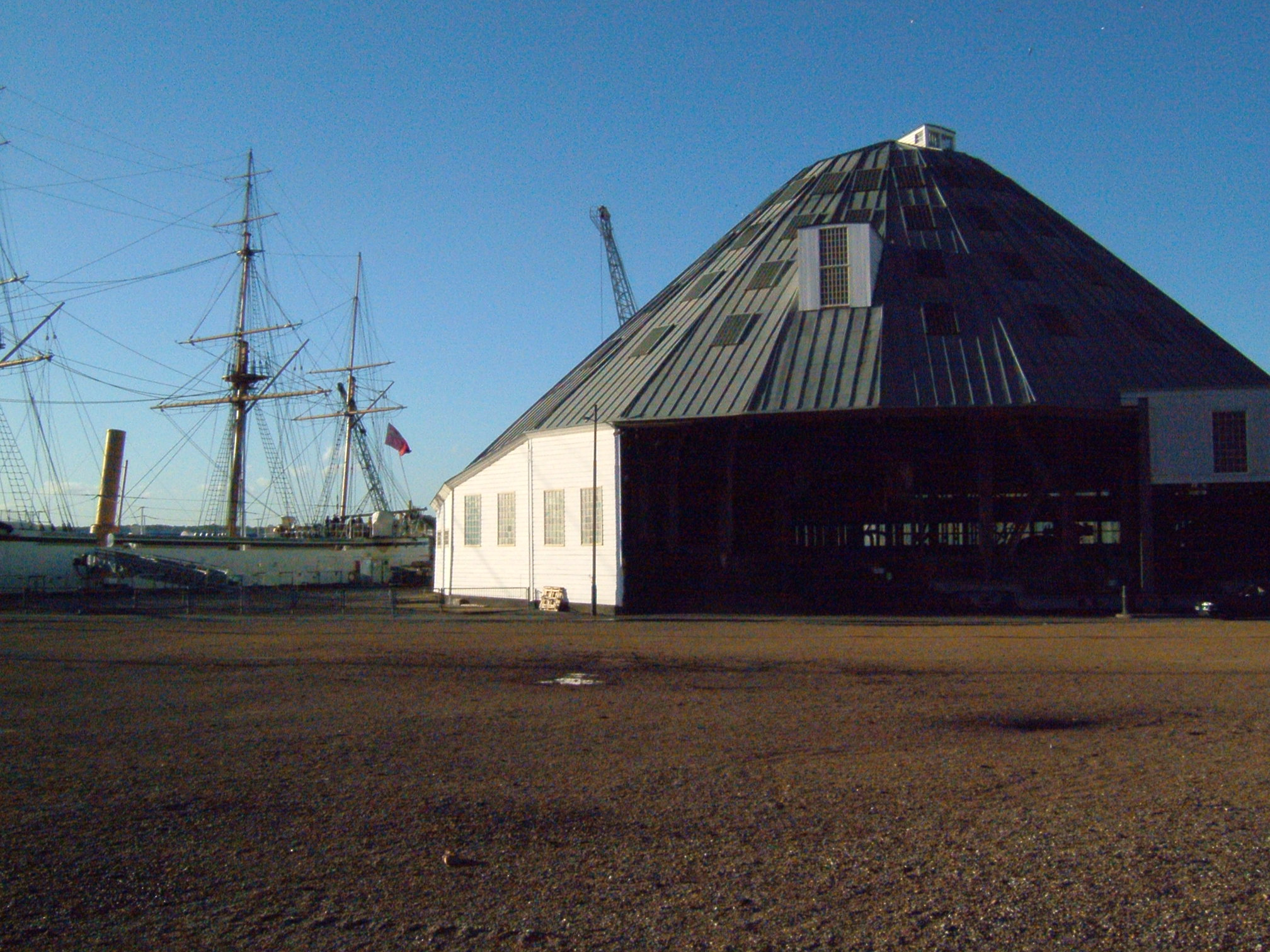
No 3 Covered Slip

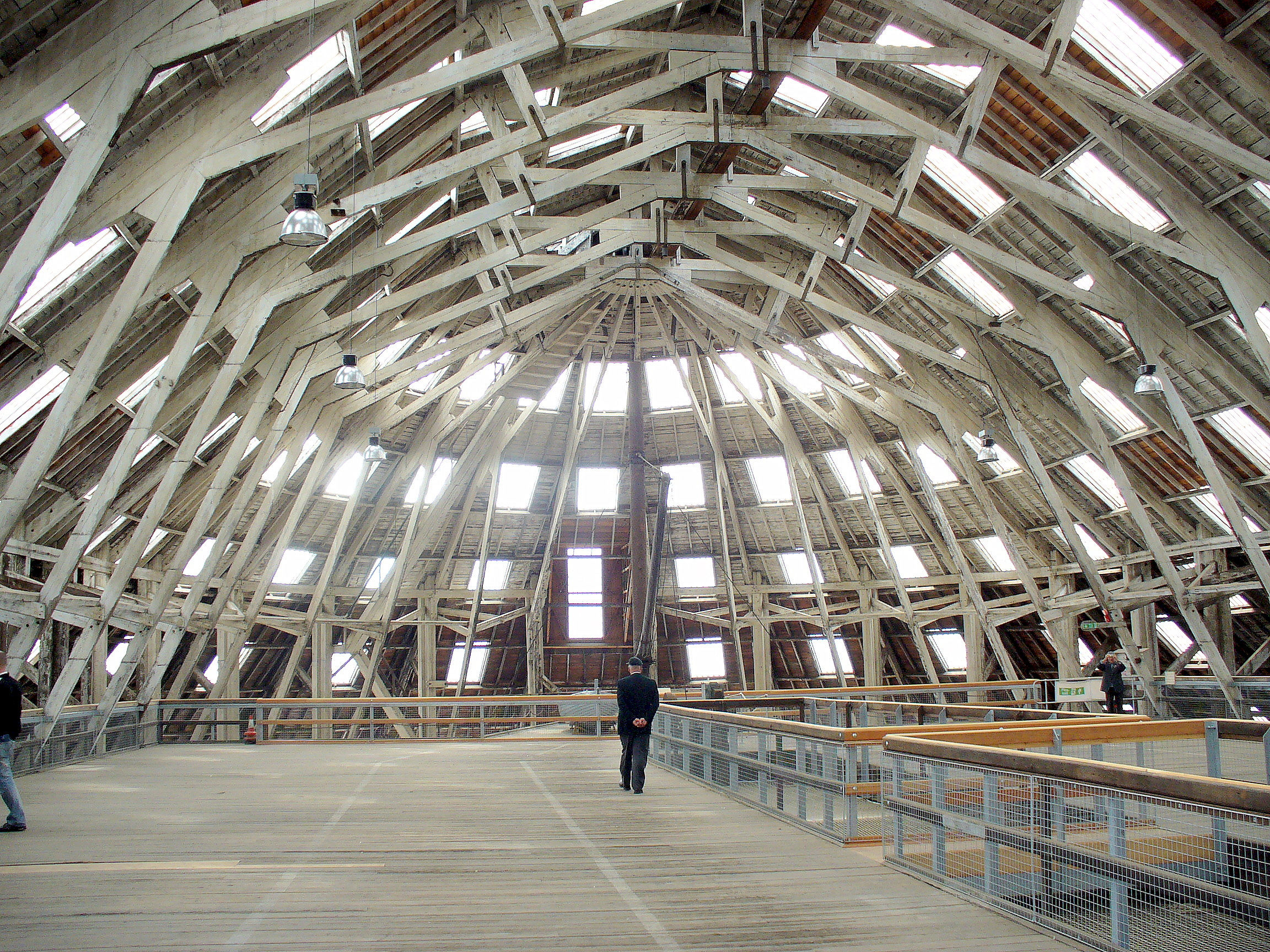
No 3 Covered Slip (interior)

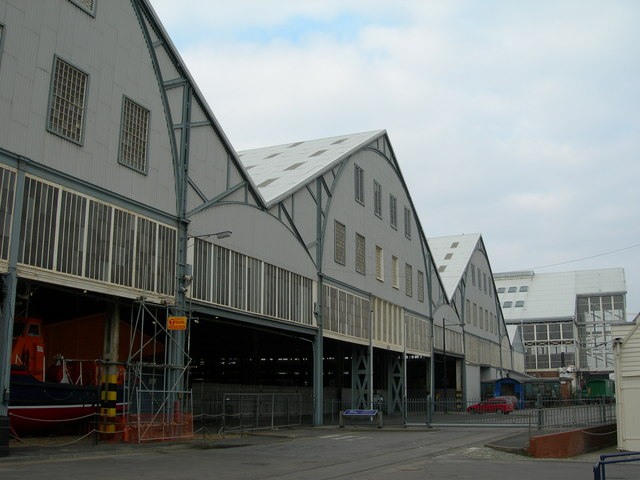
Nos 4-6 Covered Slips

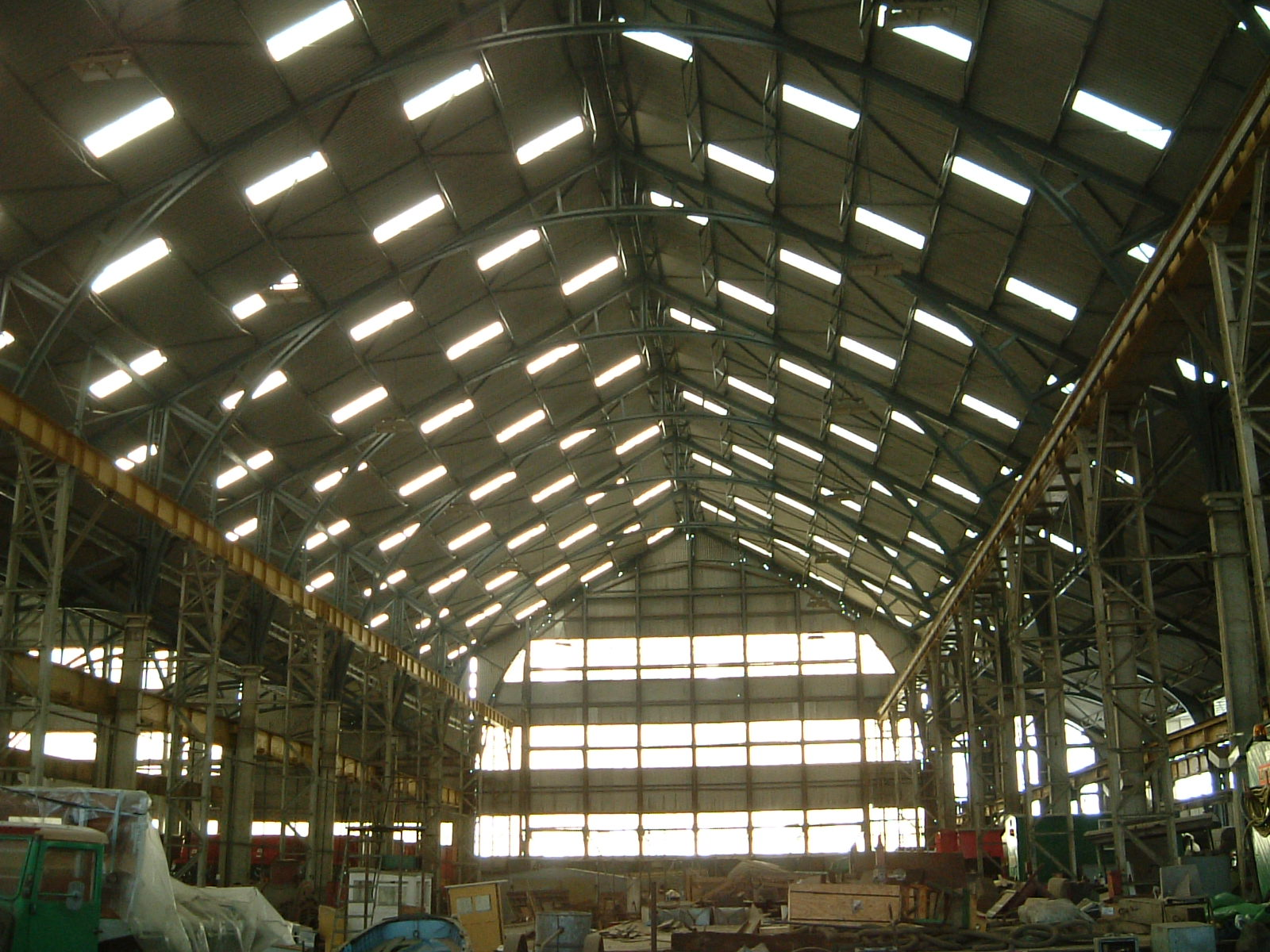
No 6 Covered Slip (interior)

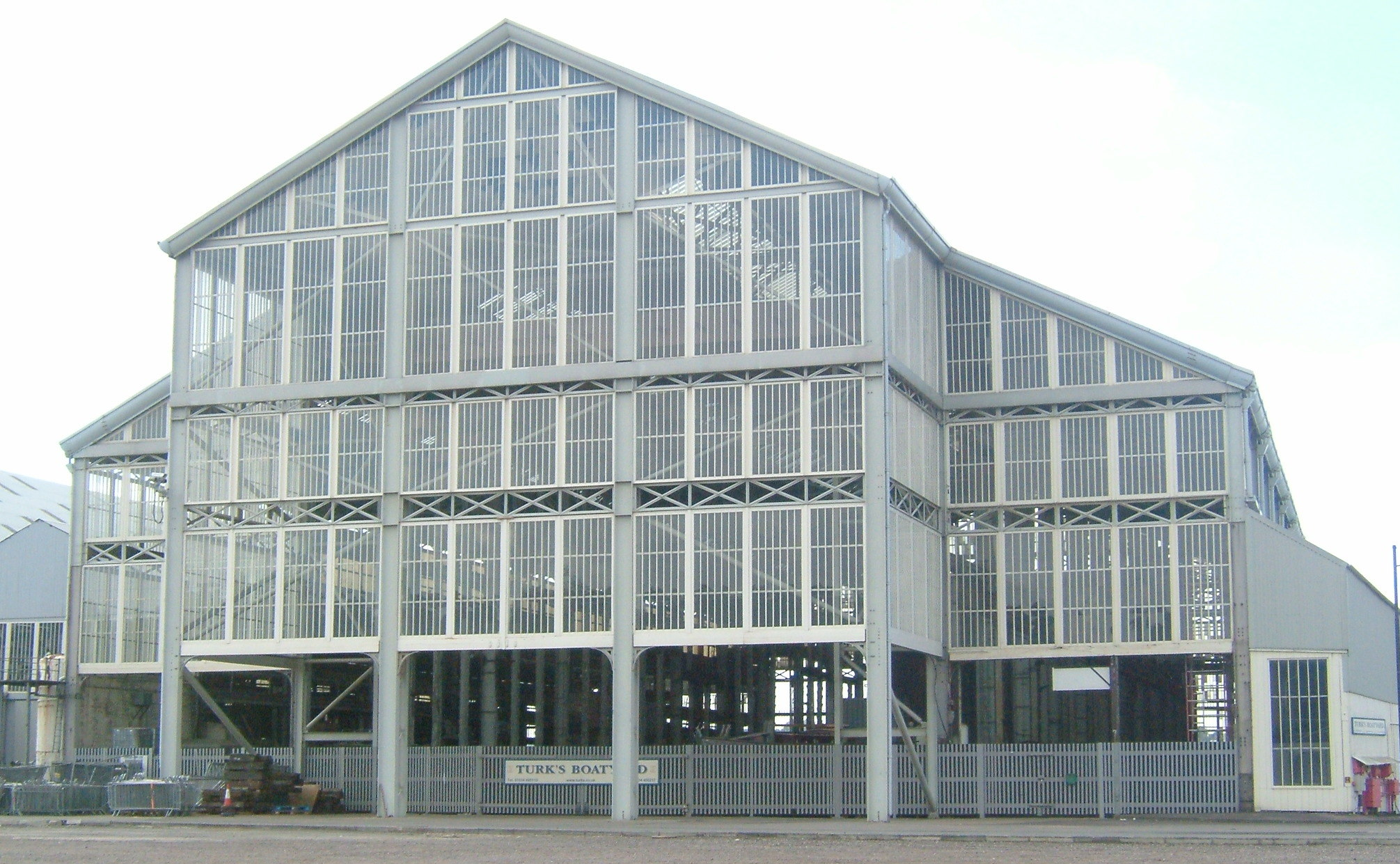
No 7 Covered Slip

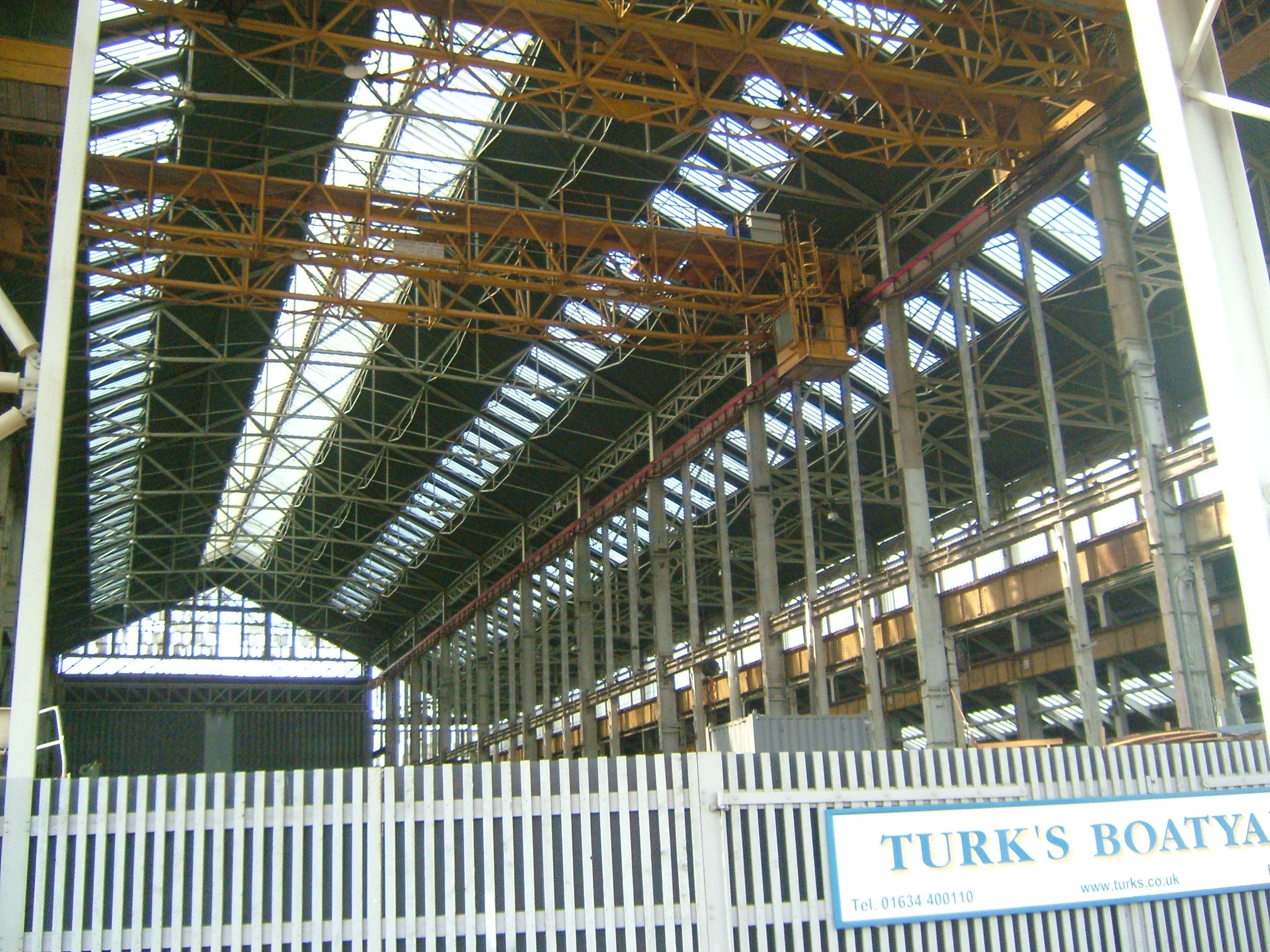
No 7 Covered Slip (interior)

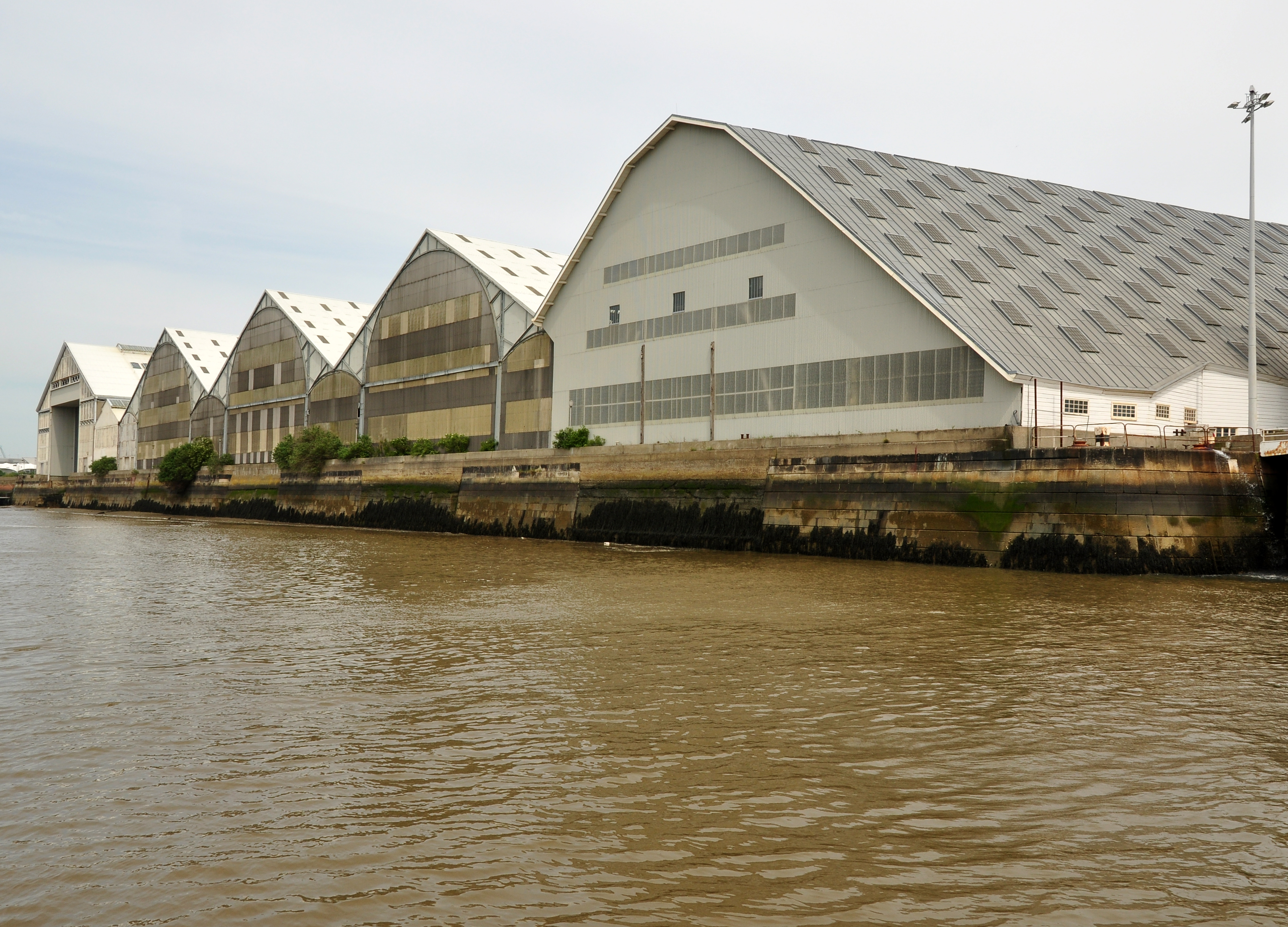
Slip covers viewed from the river

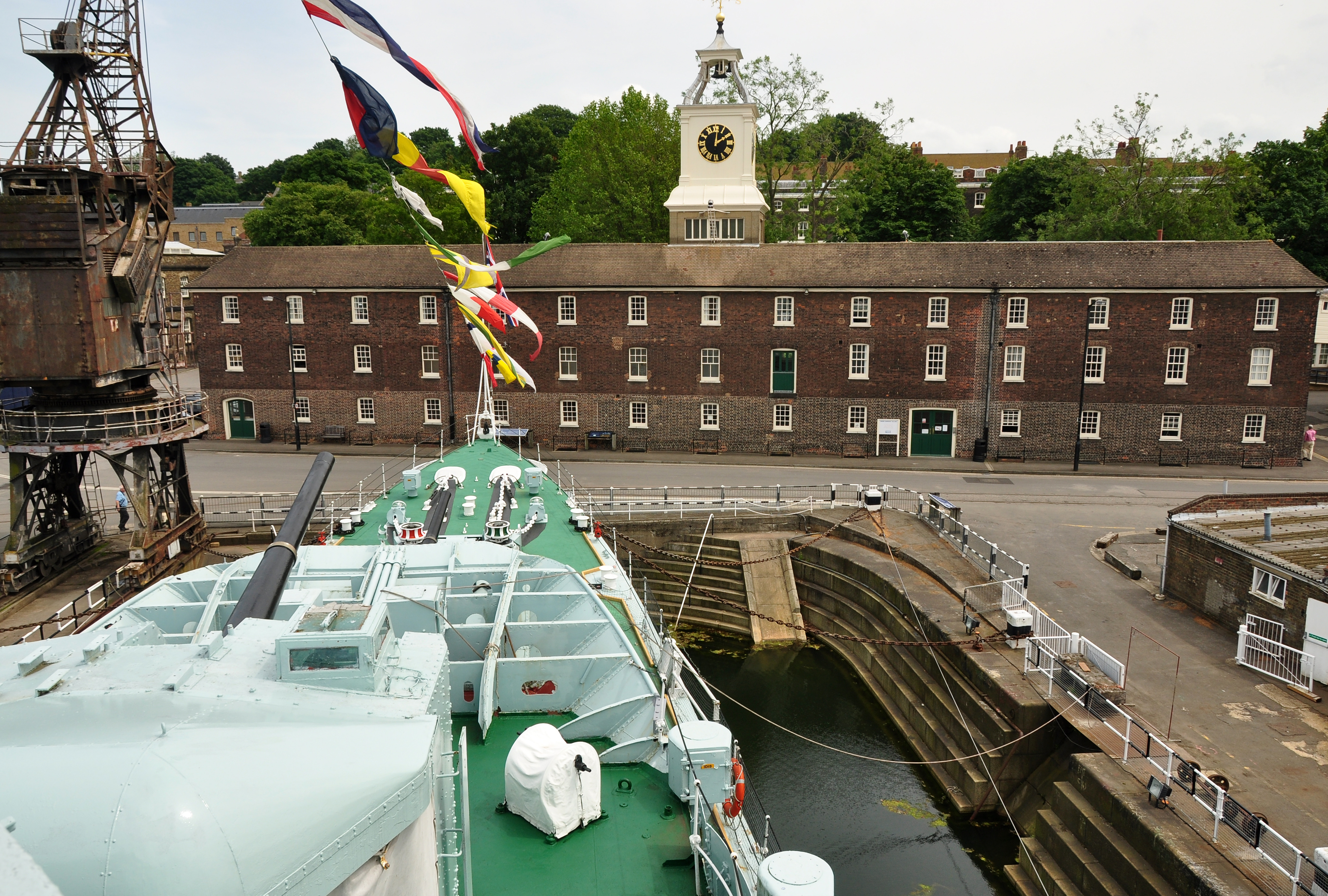
No 2 Dry Dock

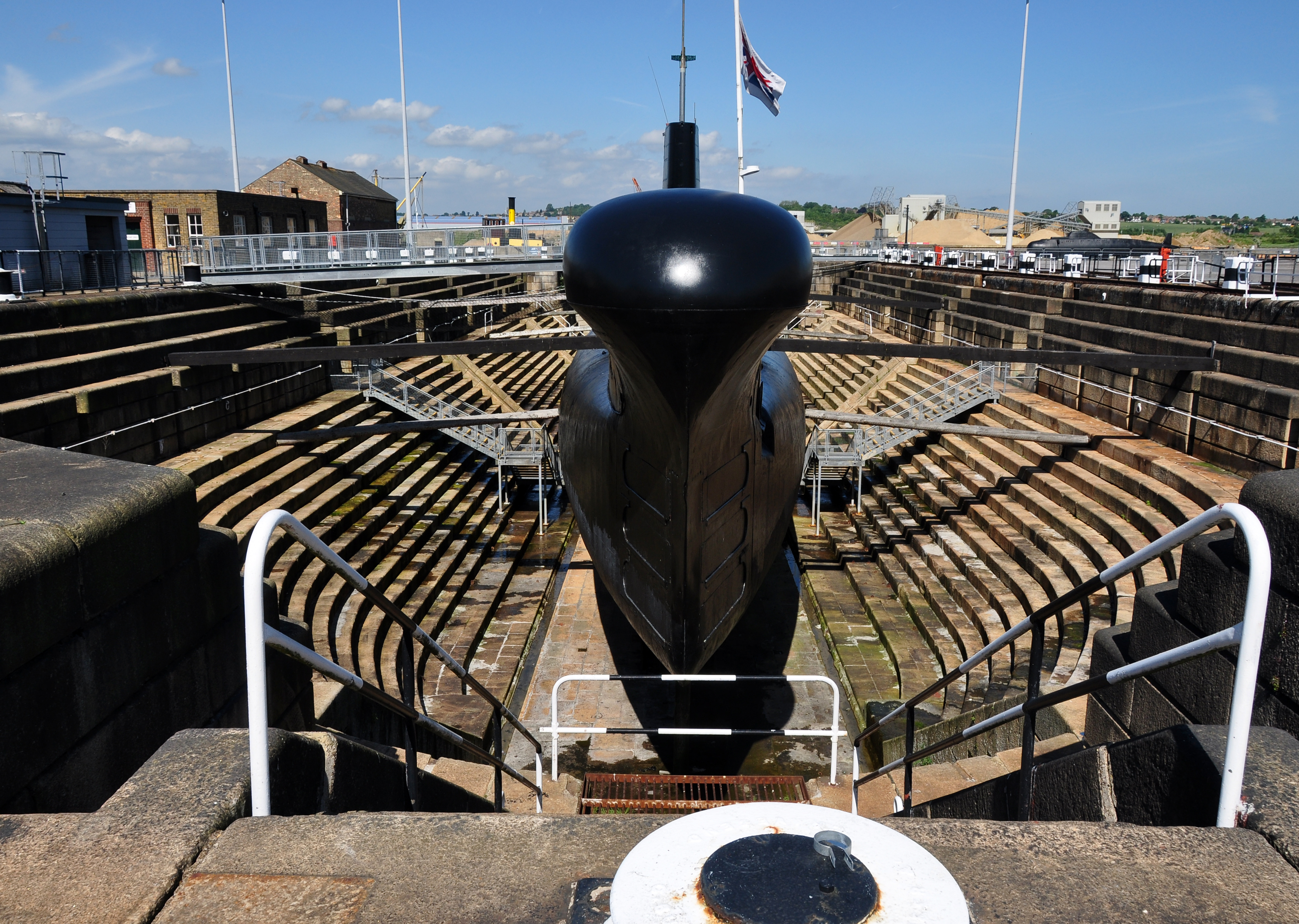
No 3 Dry Dock

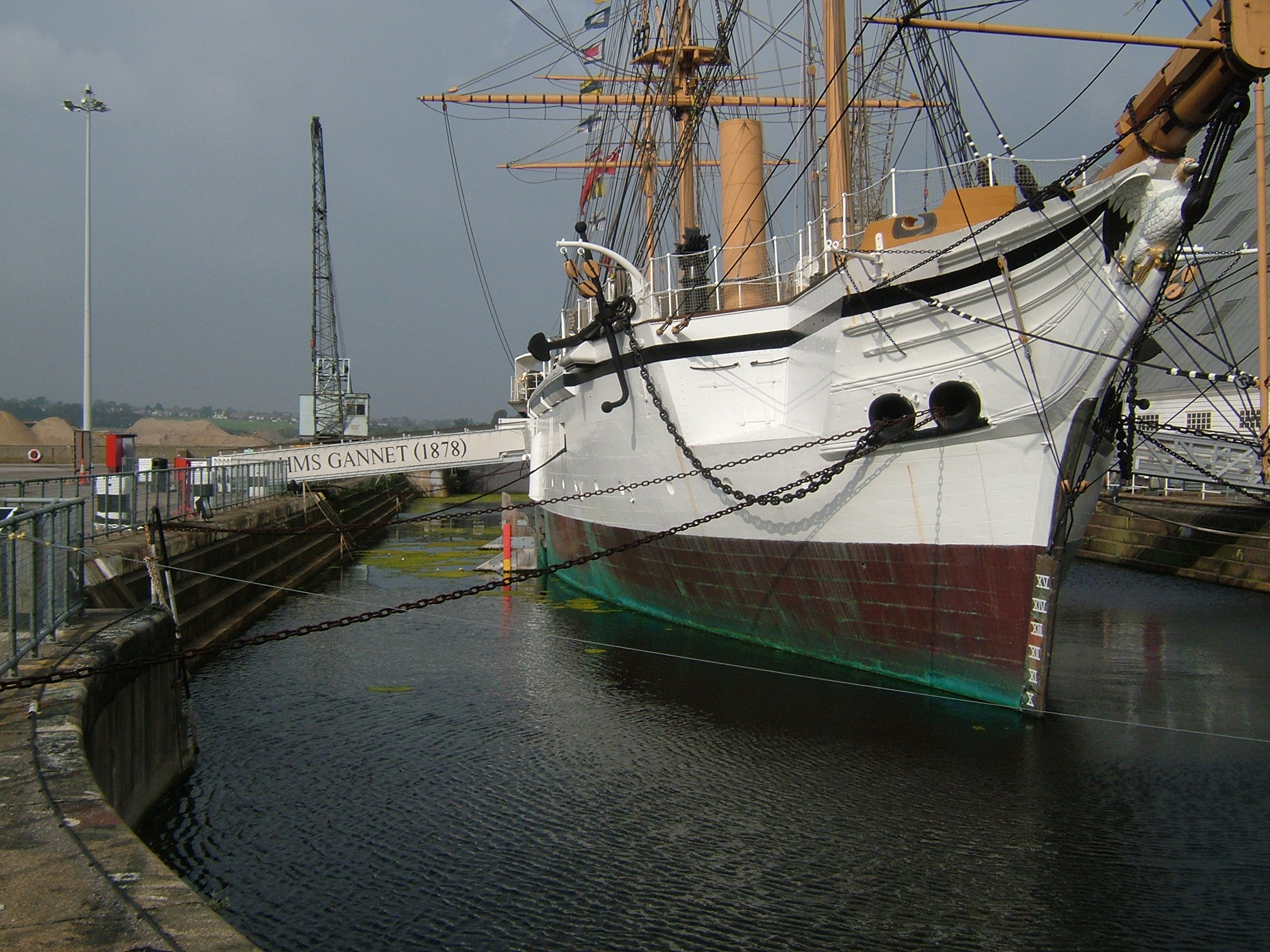
No 4 Dry Dock

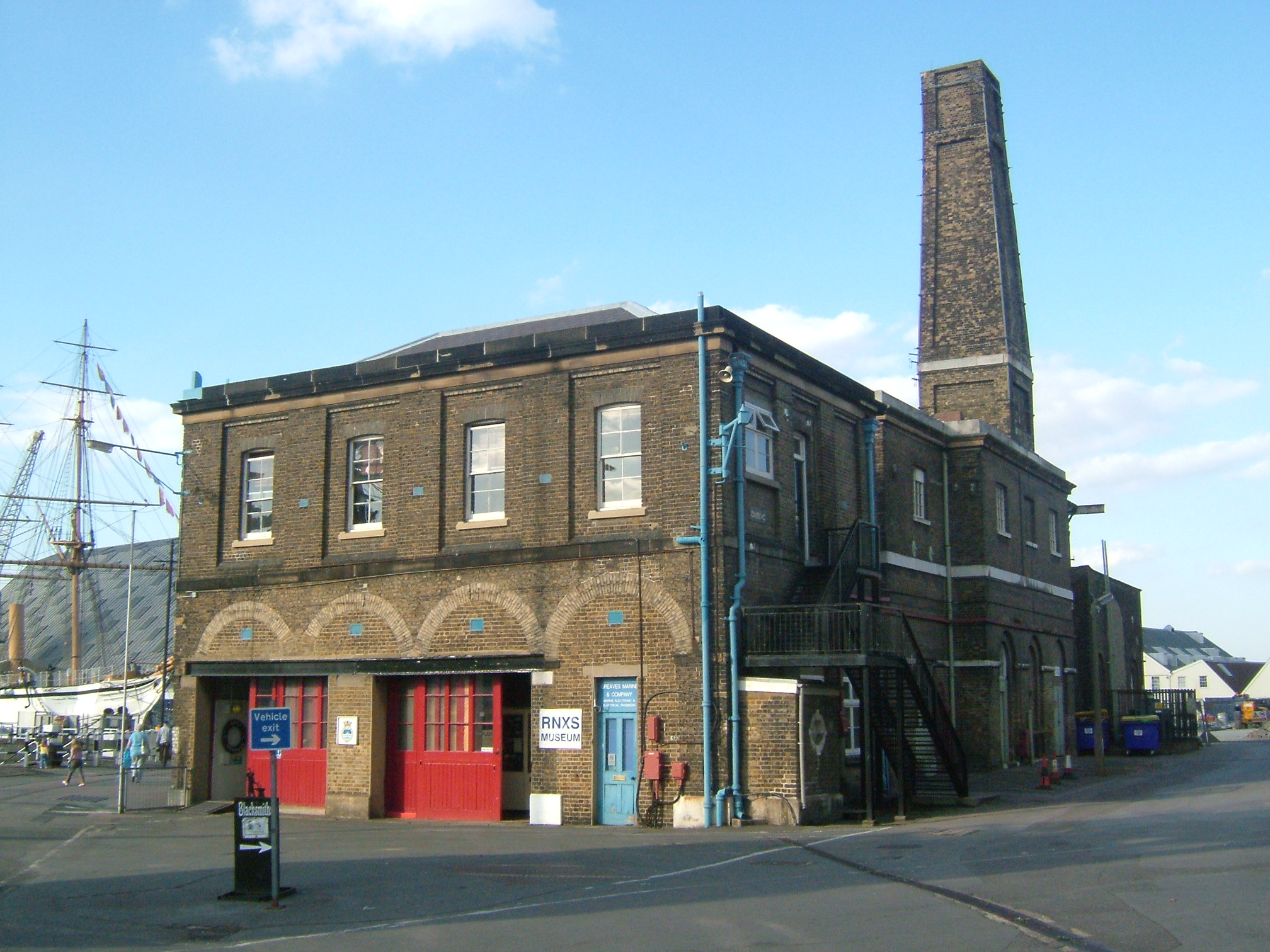
South Dock pumping station

==== Offices and residential ====
- Commissioner's House 1704. This is the oldest surviving naval building in England. It is Grade I listed. It was built for the Resident Commissioner, his family and servants. The previous building was built in 1640 for Phineas Pett. In 1703, Captain George St Lo took up the post and petitioned the Admiralty for a more suitable residence. Internally the principal feature is the main staircase with its painted wooden ceiling attributed to Thomas Highmore (Serjeant Painter), to sketches by Sir James Thornhill.
- Commissioner's Garden dating from 1640. The lower terraces are one of the first Italianate Water Gardens in England. There is a 400-year-old mulberry tree, from where Oliver Cromwell reputedly watched the Roundhead Army take Rochester from the Royalists. There is an 18th-century icehouse and an Edwardian conservatory with its great vine.
- Officers' Terrace 1722–23. Twelve houses built for senior officers in the Dockyard. The ground floor were built as offices, the first floor contained reception rooms with bedrooms above. Each has an 18th-century walled garden, which again are now very rare. They are now privately owned.
- House Carpenters' Shop c. 1740. Built to harmonise with the officers' terrace. House Carpenters worked solely on maintaining the dockyard buildings.
- Stables. For officers' horses.
- Main gatehouse 1722, designed by the master shipwright in the style of John Vanbrugh. It bears the arms of George III. Inside the gateway stands the muster bell on a wrought iron mast dating from the late 18th or early 19th century; it is Grade II* listed.
- Guard House 1764. Built when Marines were introduced into the Dockyard to improve security. It continued in use till 1984.
- Cashiers' Office 18th century. The Pay Office was moved here in 1750 from Hill House, and remained here until the yard closed. John Dickens, father of Charles Dickens, worked here from 1817 to 1822. It is still used as offices.
- Assistant Queen's Harbourmaster's Office c. 1770, Grade II* listed. This office was supplied to the person who has been appointed to superintend the Dockyard Port. In 1865, the whole of the tidal Medway from Allington Lock to Sheerness was designated as a dockyard port and the Assistant Queen's Harbourmaster was responsible for all moorings and movements. Alongside this office is a set of stone steps leading into the river Medway, with a wrought iron arch and lantern holder. Also Grade II listed. This was called the "Queen Stairs" and was the formal entry into the dockyard, during the "Age of Sail".
- Dockyard Church 1806. Designed by Edward Holl, it has a gallery supported on cast iron columns, one of the first uses of cast iron in the dockyard. Last used in 1981.
- Admiral's Offices 1808. Designed by Edward Holl as offices for the master shipwright. The roofline was low so it would not obstruct the view from the officers' terrace. Later it became Port Admiral's office and was extended. The northern extension became the dockyard's communication centre.
- Thunderbolt Pier, a pier named after HMS Thunderbolt, built 1856, which was used as a floating pier from 1873 until 1948, when she was rammed and sunk.
- Captain of the Dockyard's House 19th century. Now a private residence. Also Grade II* listed.
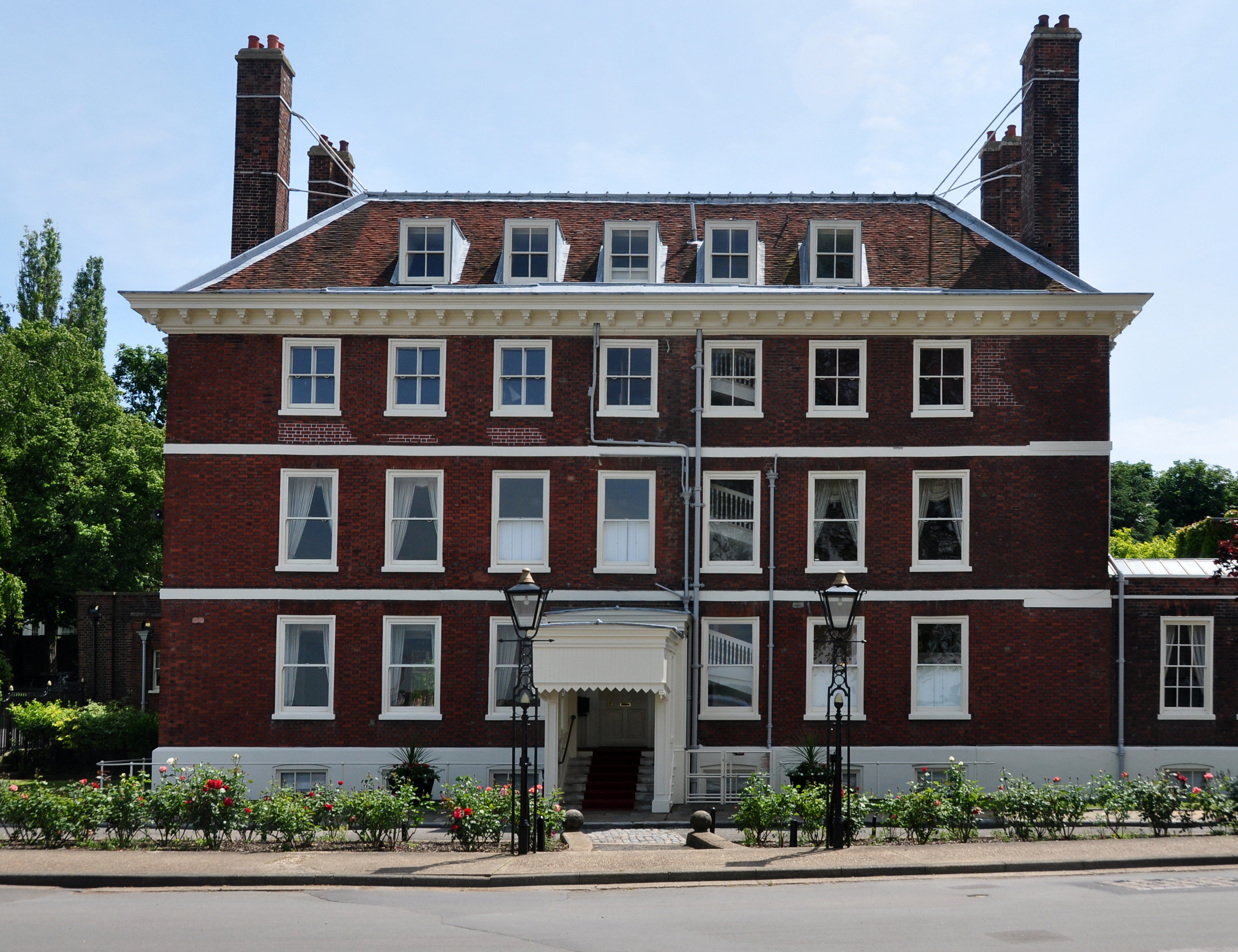
Commissioner's House

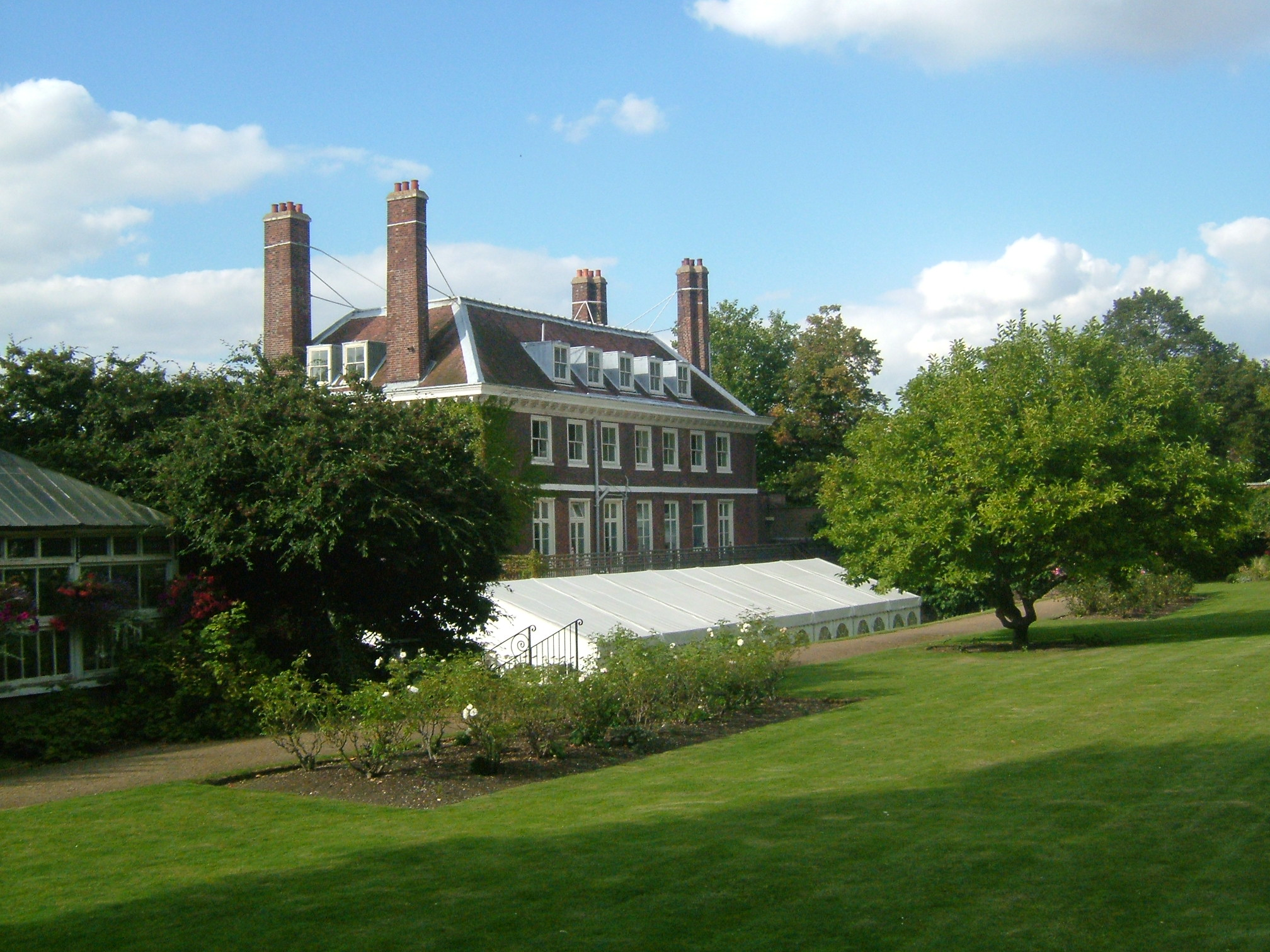
The Commissioner's House (garden view)

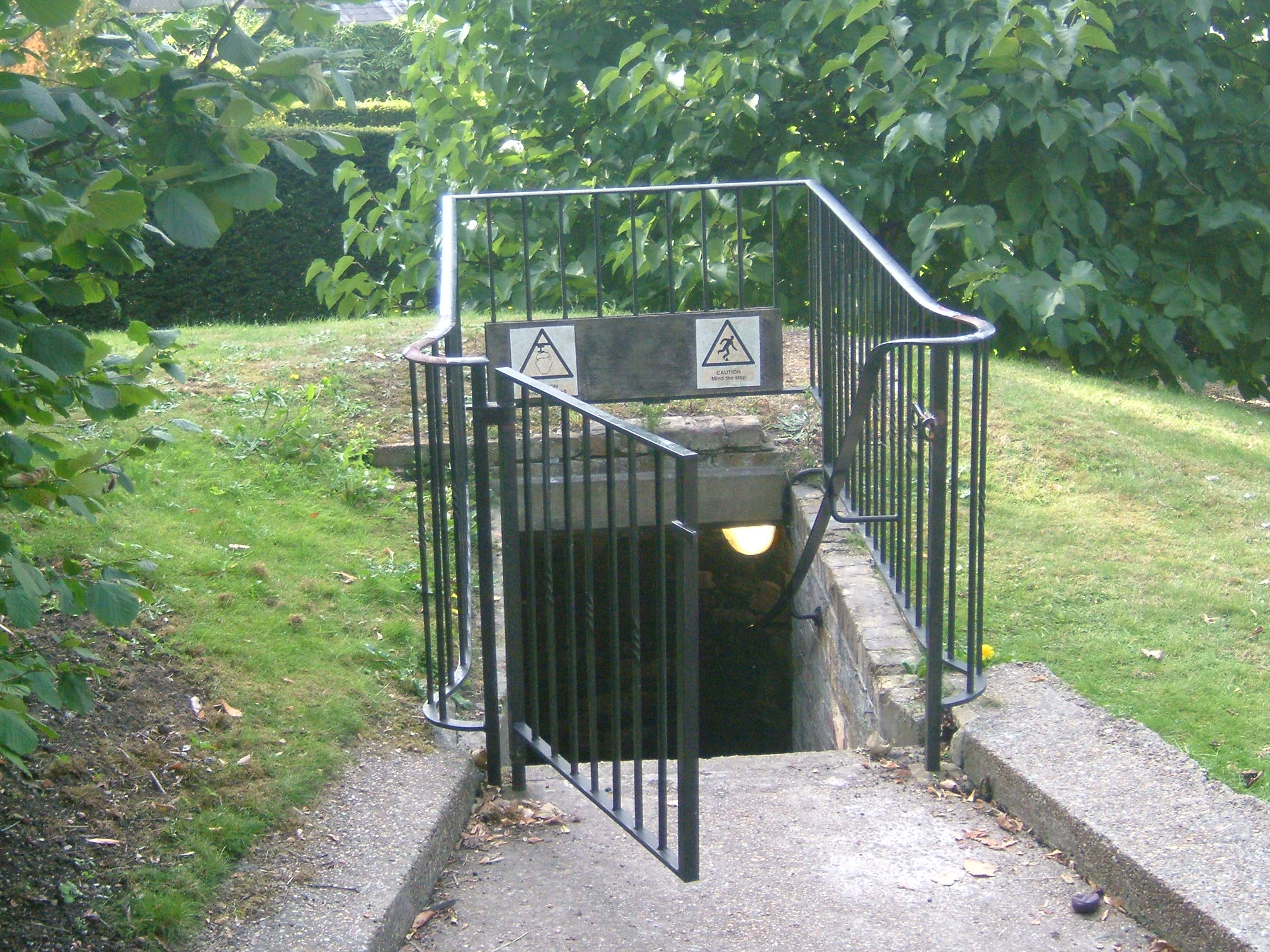
The entrance to the Ice House

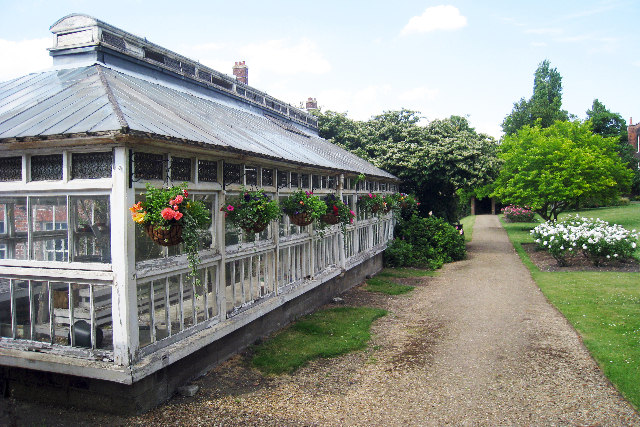
The Edwardian conservatory

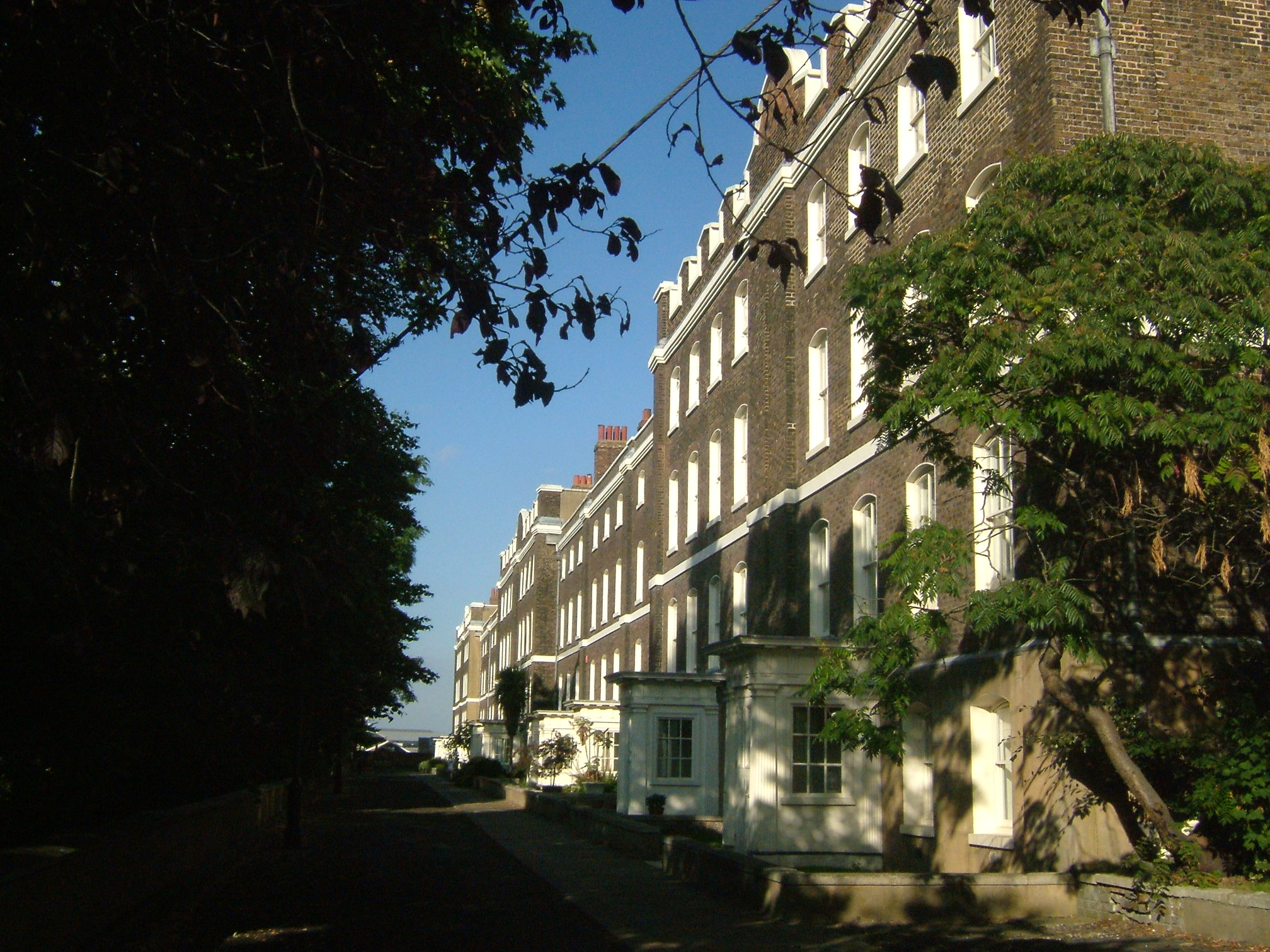
Officers' Terrace

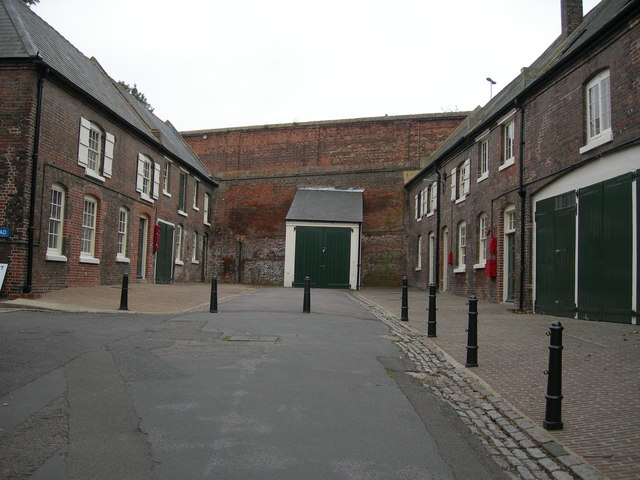
The Officers' Stables

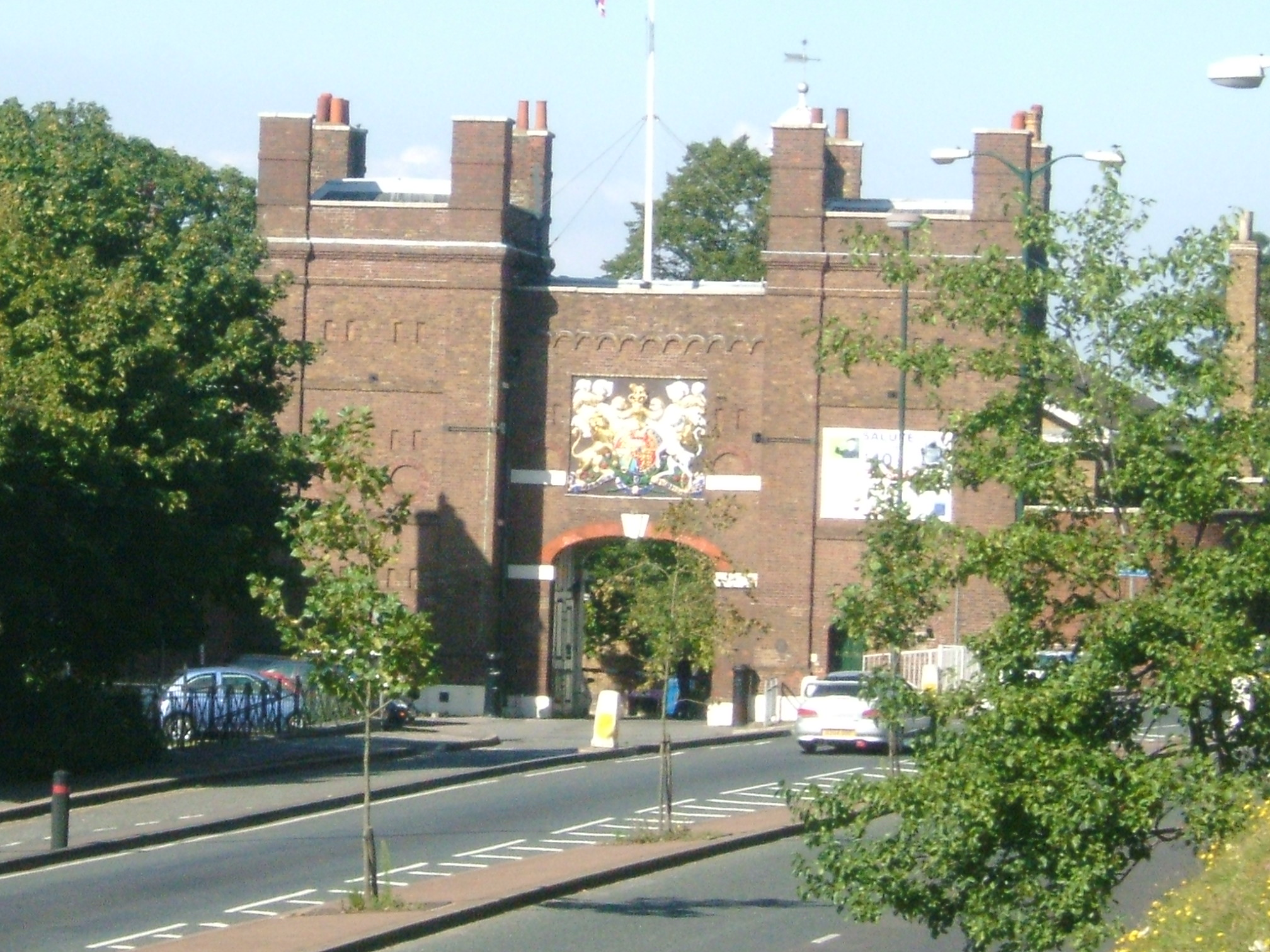
The Main Gate from outside

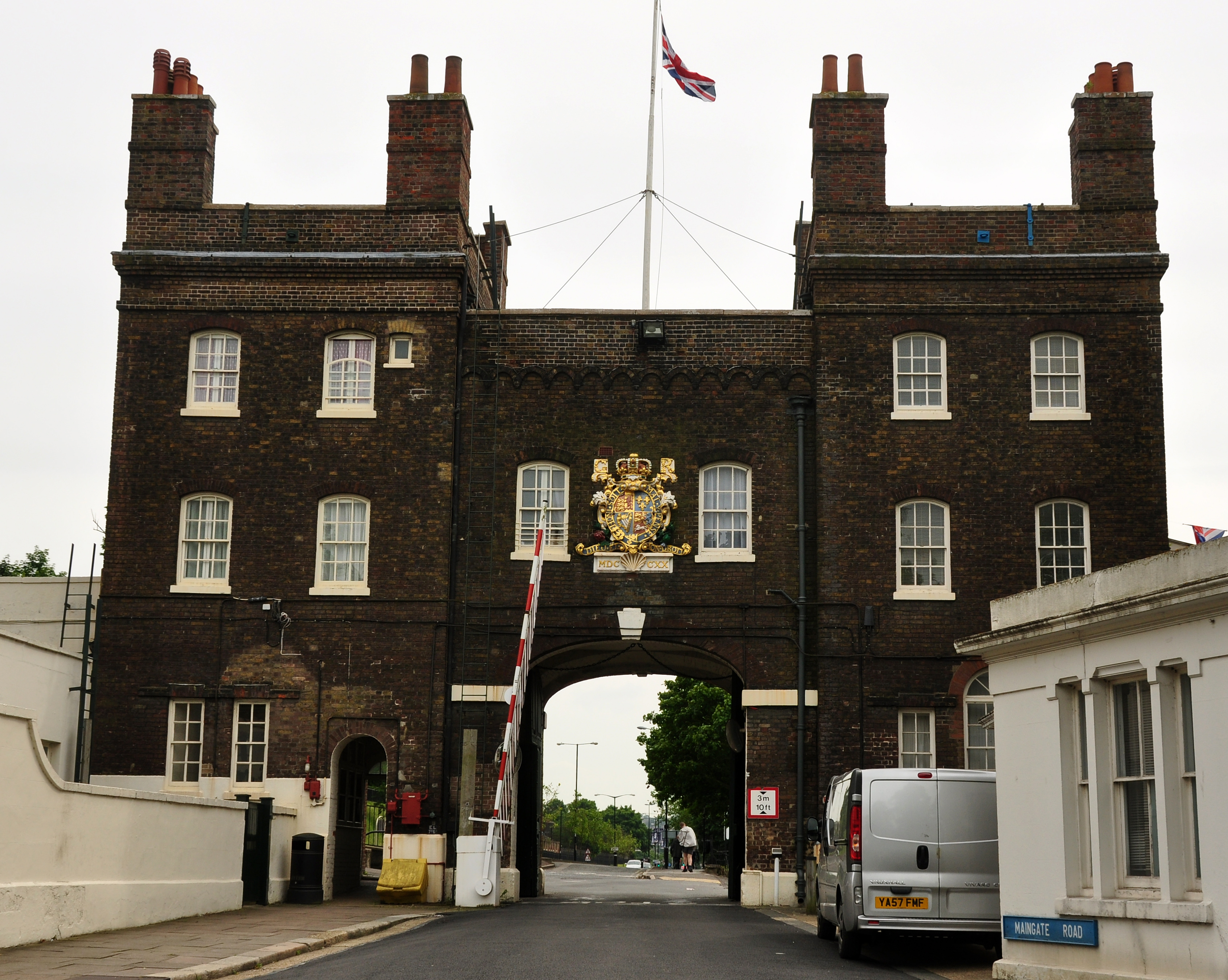
The Main Gate from inside

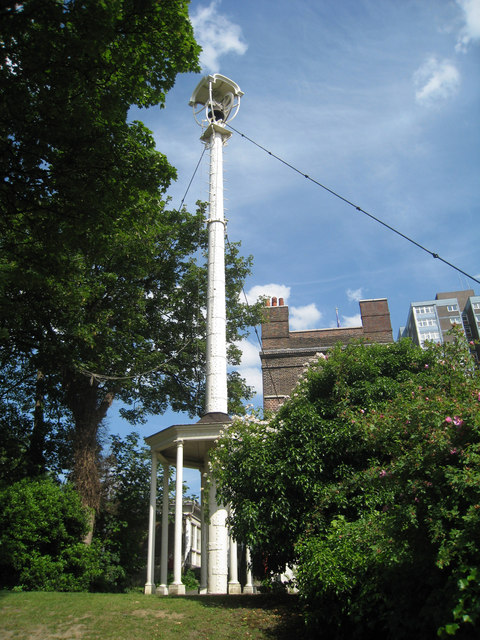
The bell mast

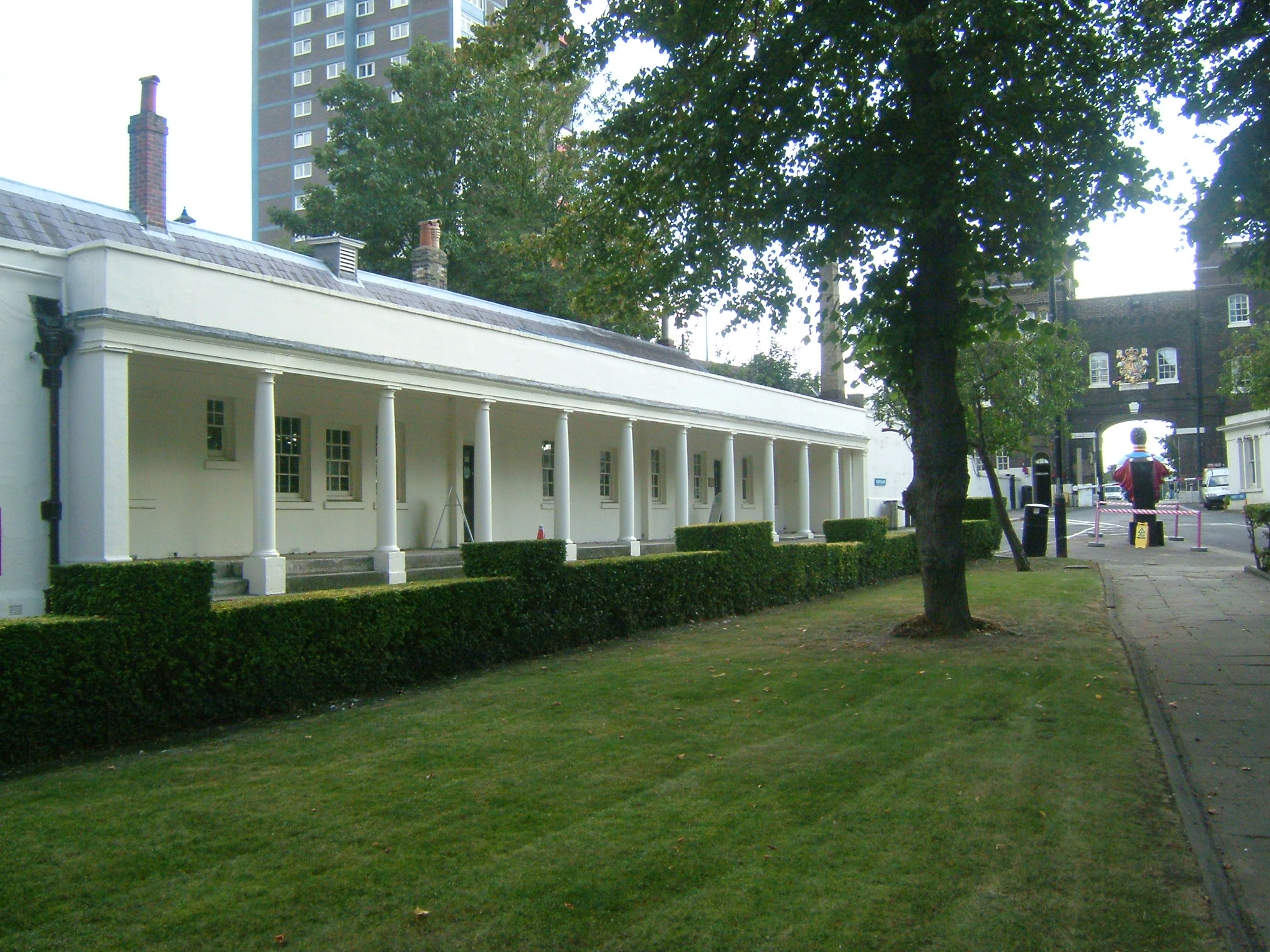
The Guardhouse

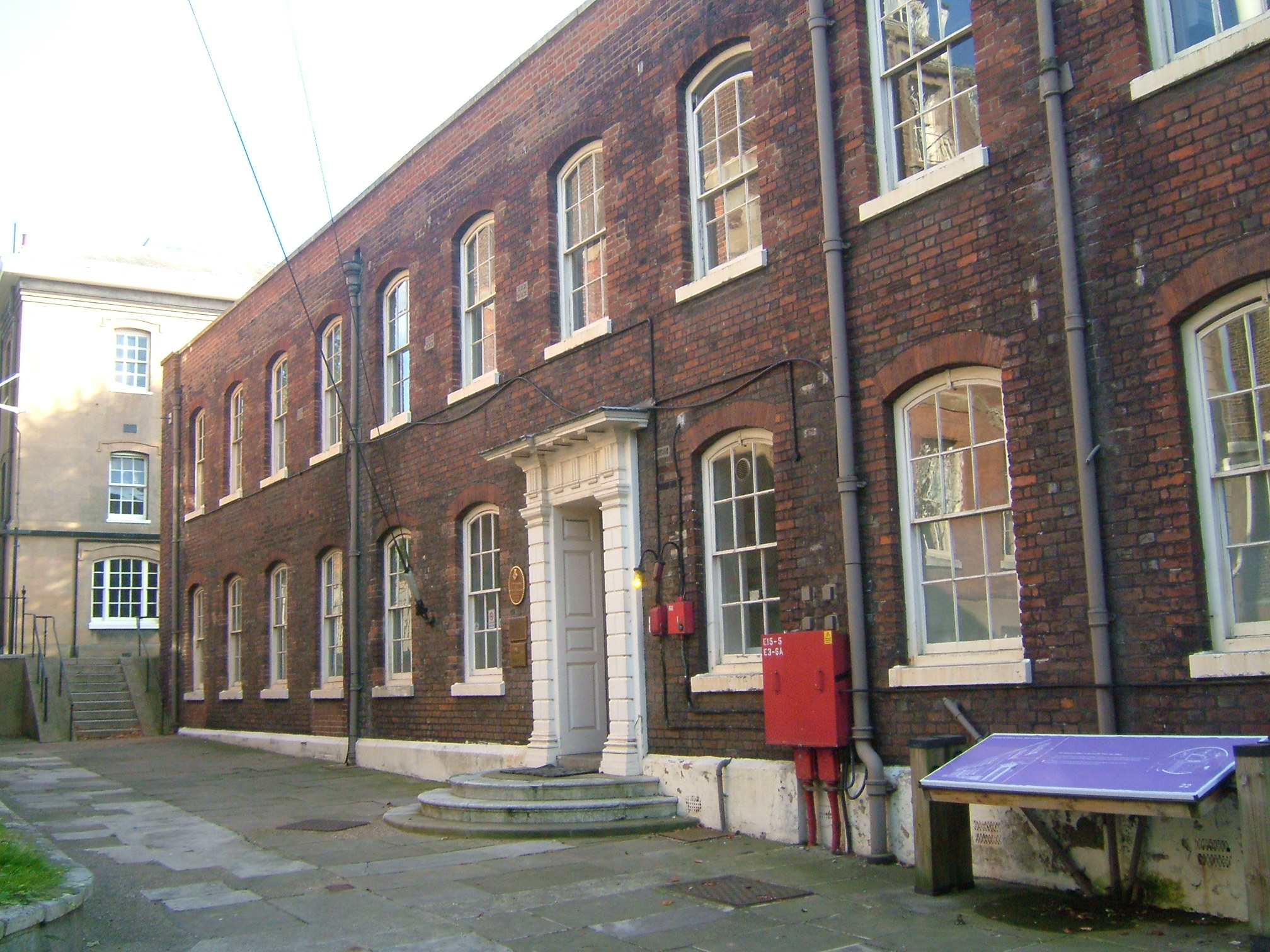
The Cashier's Office

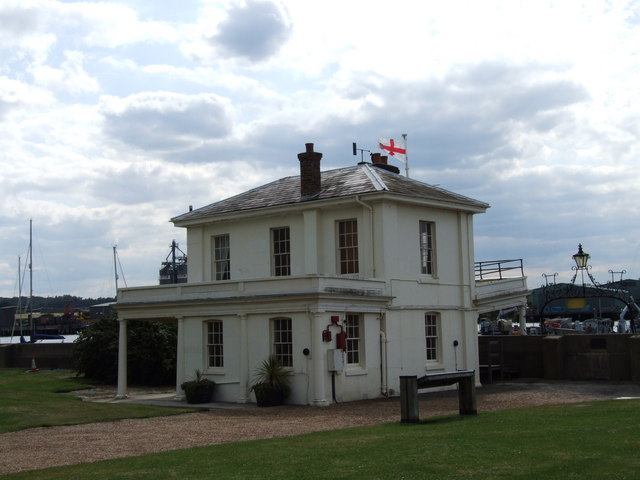
Assistant Queen's Harbourmaster's Office

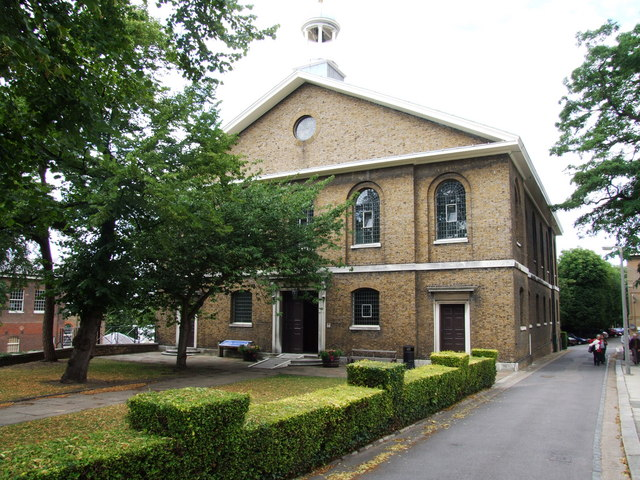
Dockyard Church

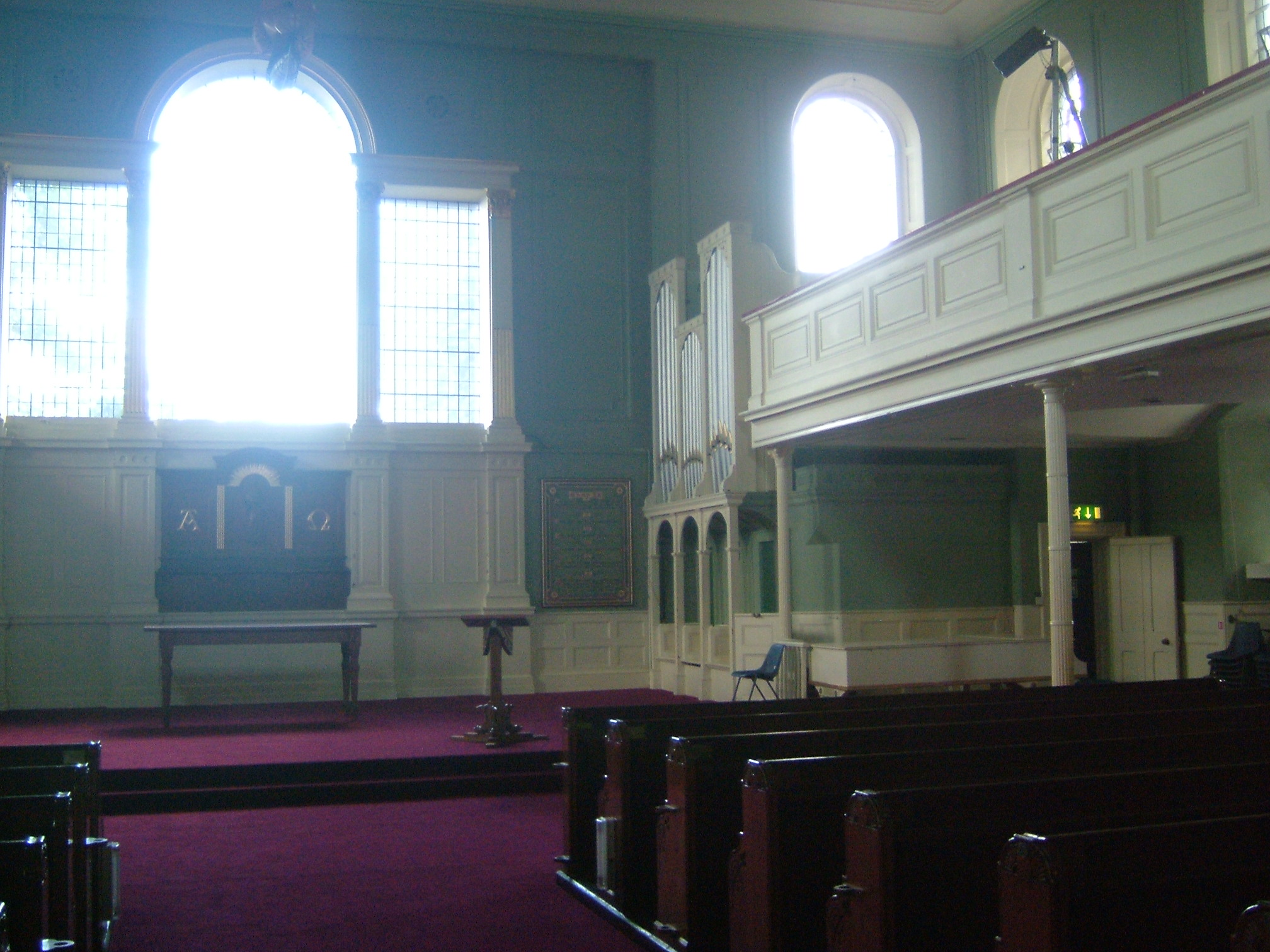
Dockyard Church (interior)

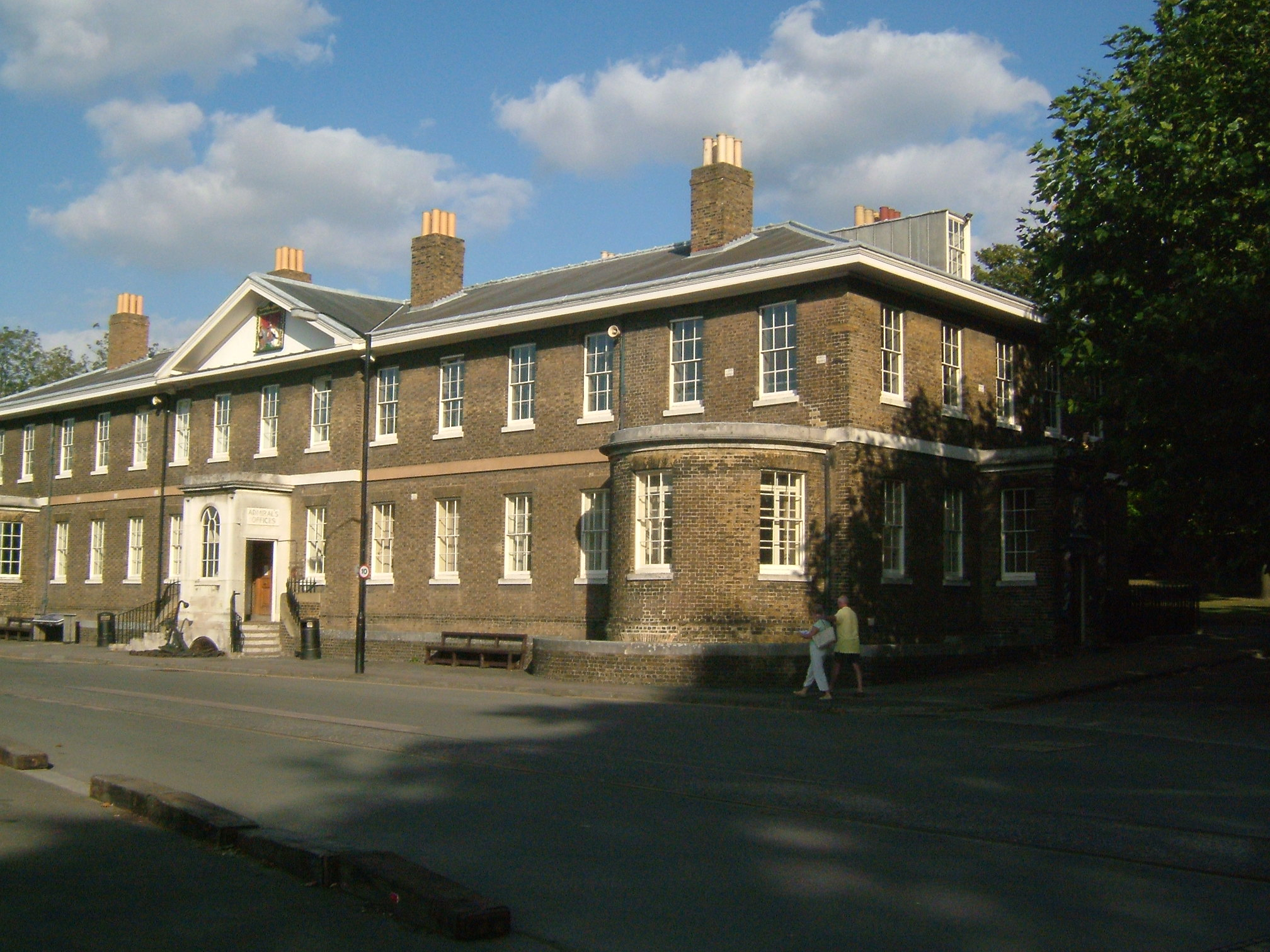
The Admiral's Office

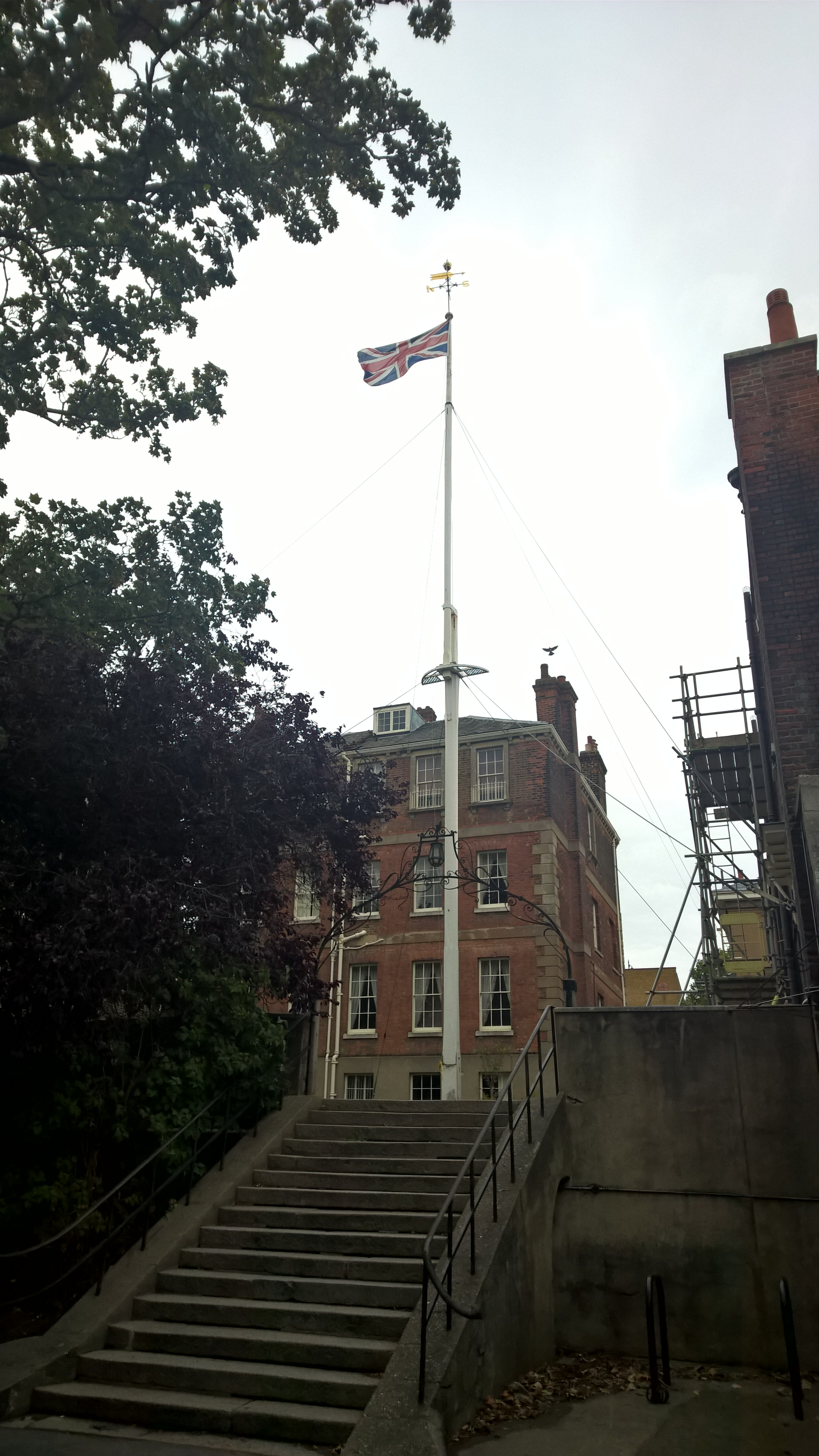
The Captain of the Dockyard's House and flagstaff

==== Anchor Wharf and the Ropery ====
- Anchor Wharf Store Houses 1778–1805 (at nearly 700 feet [210 m] long) are the largest storehouses ever built for the navy.
  - The southern building, Store House No 3, completed in 1785, is subdivided with timber lattice partitions as a "lay apart store", a store for equipment from vessels under repair. It has been Grade I listed since August 1999.
  - The northern building was used as a fitted rigging house, and a general store for equipment to fit out newly built ships. It also has been Grade I listed since August 1999. The Fitted Rigging House is now used as the Library and houses the Steam Steel and Submarines 1832–1984 gallery.
- The Ropery consists of Hemp Houses (1728, extended 1812), Yarn Houses and a double Rope House with attached Hatchelling House. Hatchelling is combing the hemp fibres to straighten them out before spinning. This was the first stage of the ropemaking process. The Ropery is still in use, being operated by Master Ropemakers Ltd.
  - The Double Rope House has spinning on the upper floors and ropemaking (a ropewalk) on the ground floor. It is 346 m (1,135 ft) long, and when constructed was the longest brick-built building in Europe capable of laying a 1,000 ft (300 m) rope. Over 200 men were required before 1836, to make and lay a 20in (circumference) cable. All was done by hand. Steam power in the form of a beam engine was introduced in 1836, and then electricity in the early 1900s.
  - The White Yarn House to store the yarn before it was tarred to prevent rot.
  - The Tarring House with its "Tar Kettle" and horse drawn winch.
  - The Black Yarn House to store the tarred yarn. The tarring process declined as manila replaced hemp, and sisal replaced manila. These fibres were chemically protected at the hatchelling stage and tarring stopped in the 1940s.
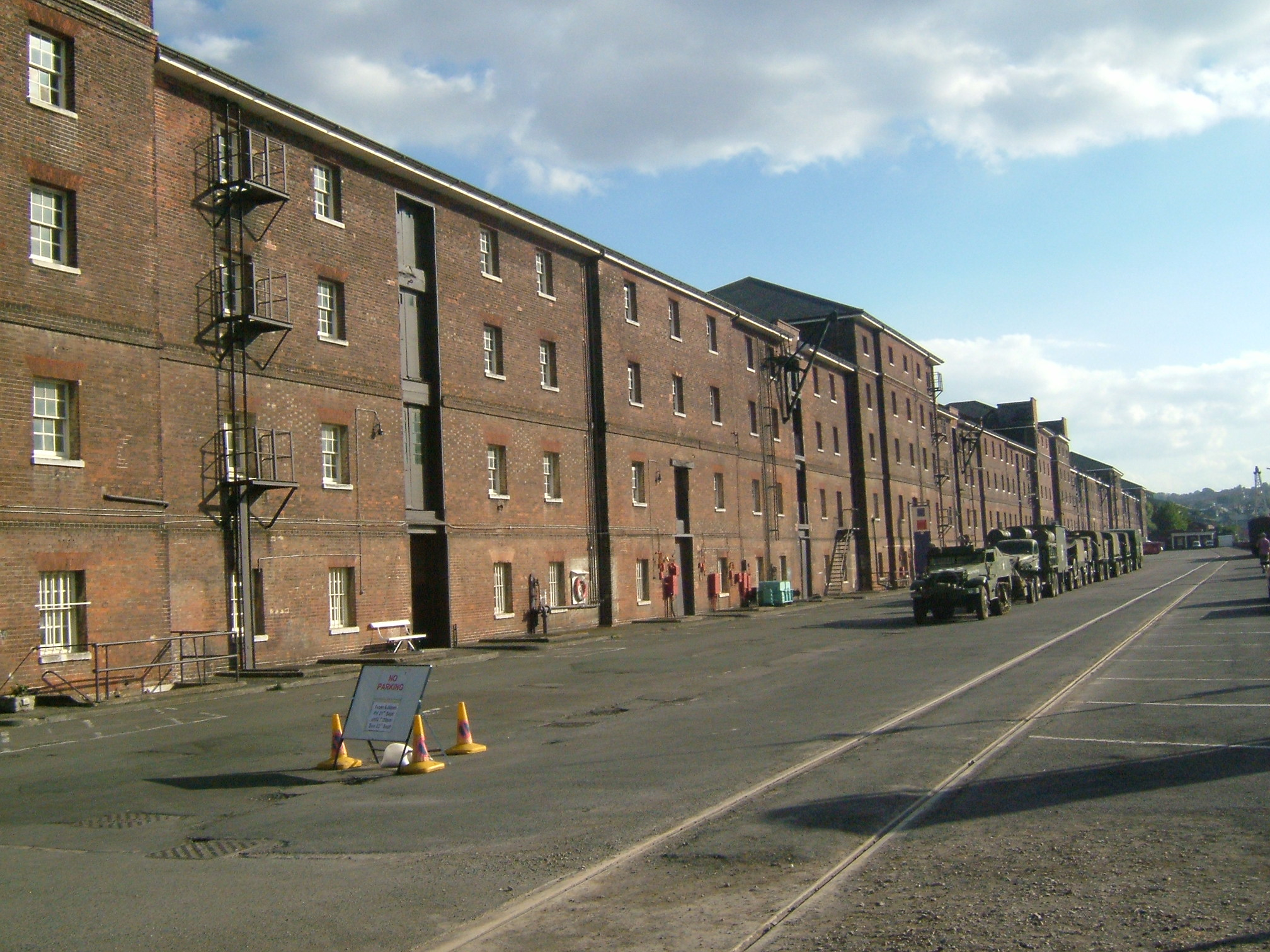
Anchor Wharf Store Houses

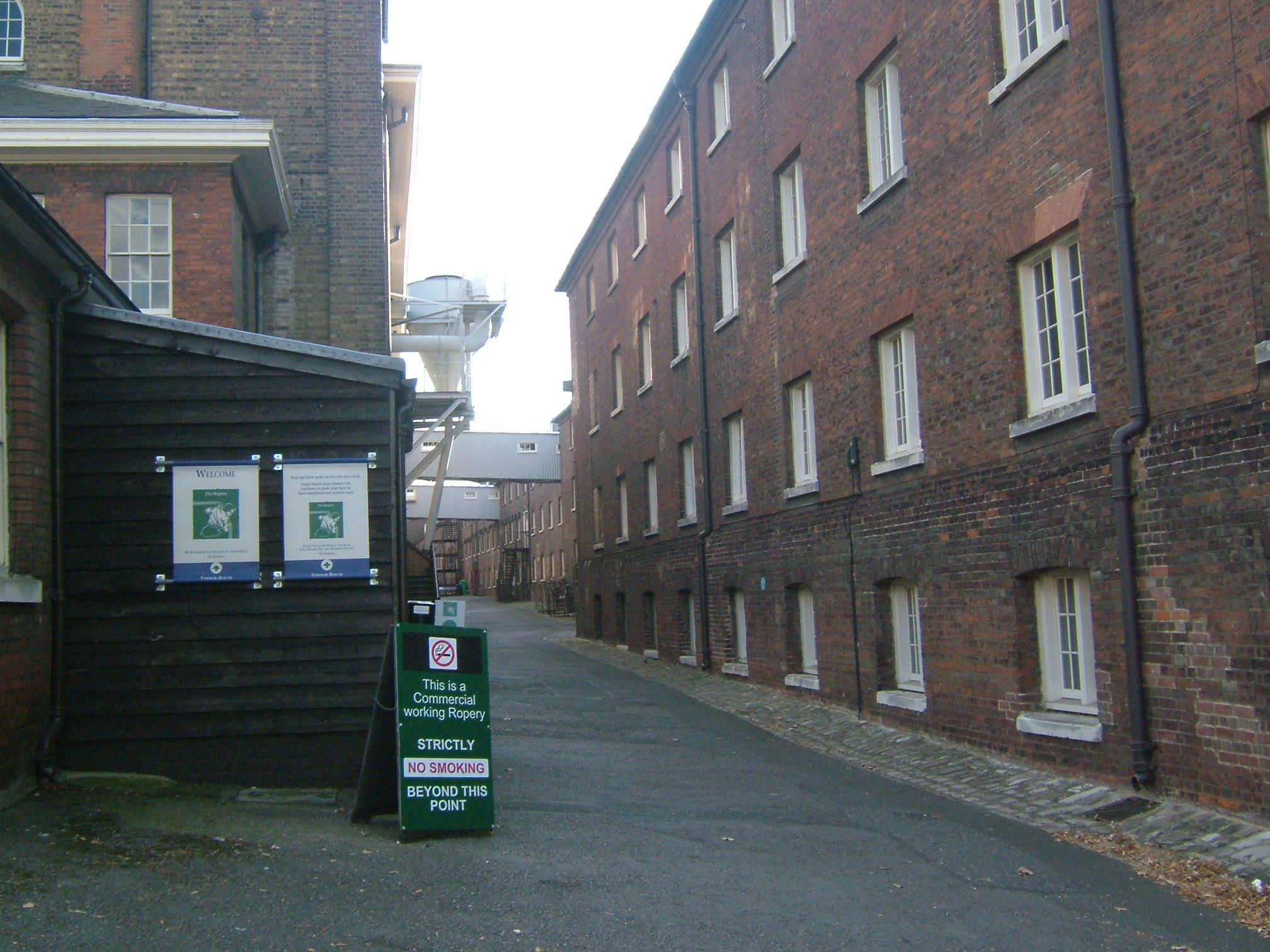
Hemp Houses and Hatchelling House

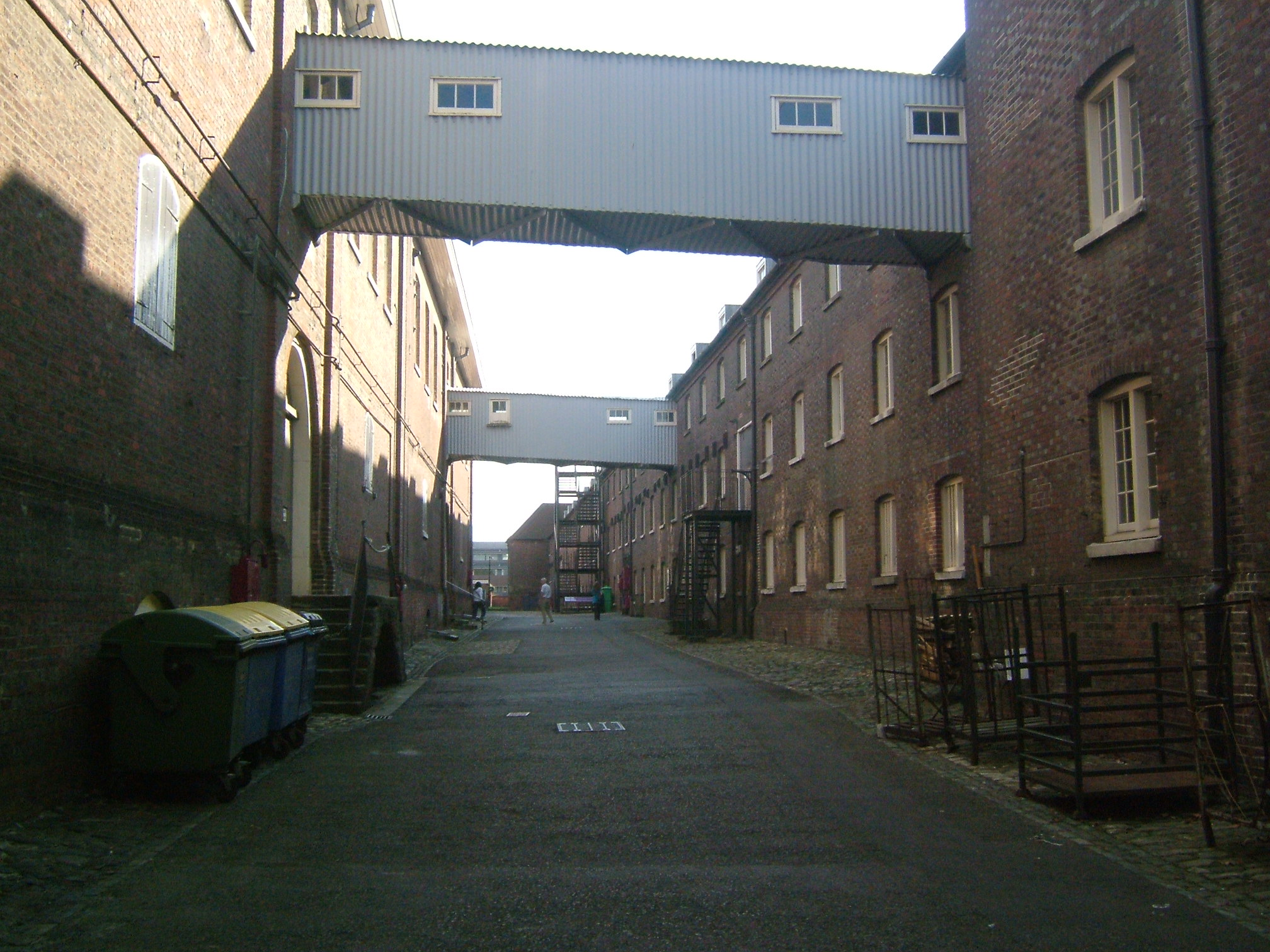
Hemp Houses and Double Ropewalk

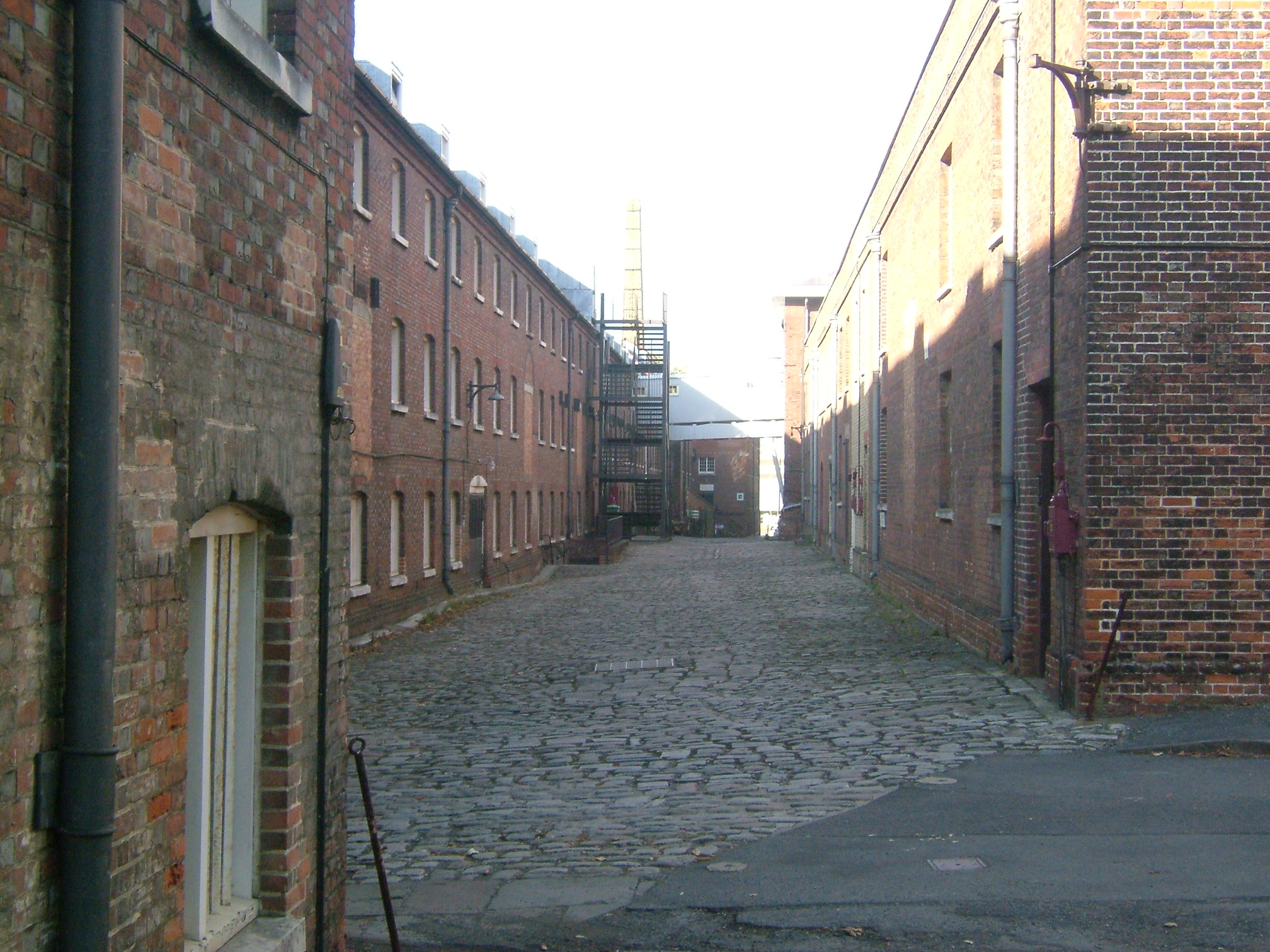
Double Ropewalk and Black Yarn House to right

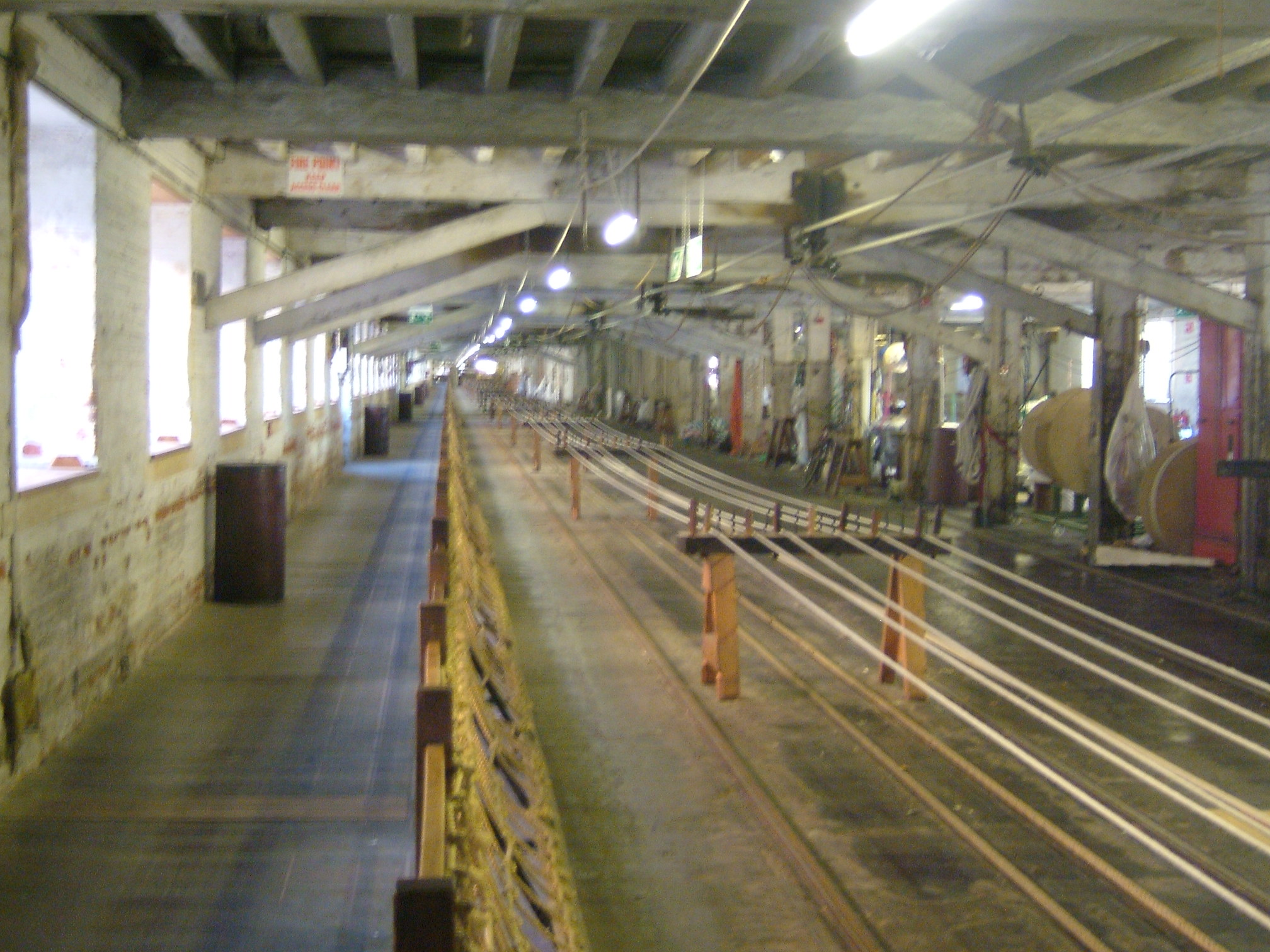
Laying the Rope

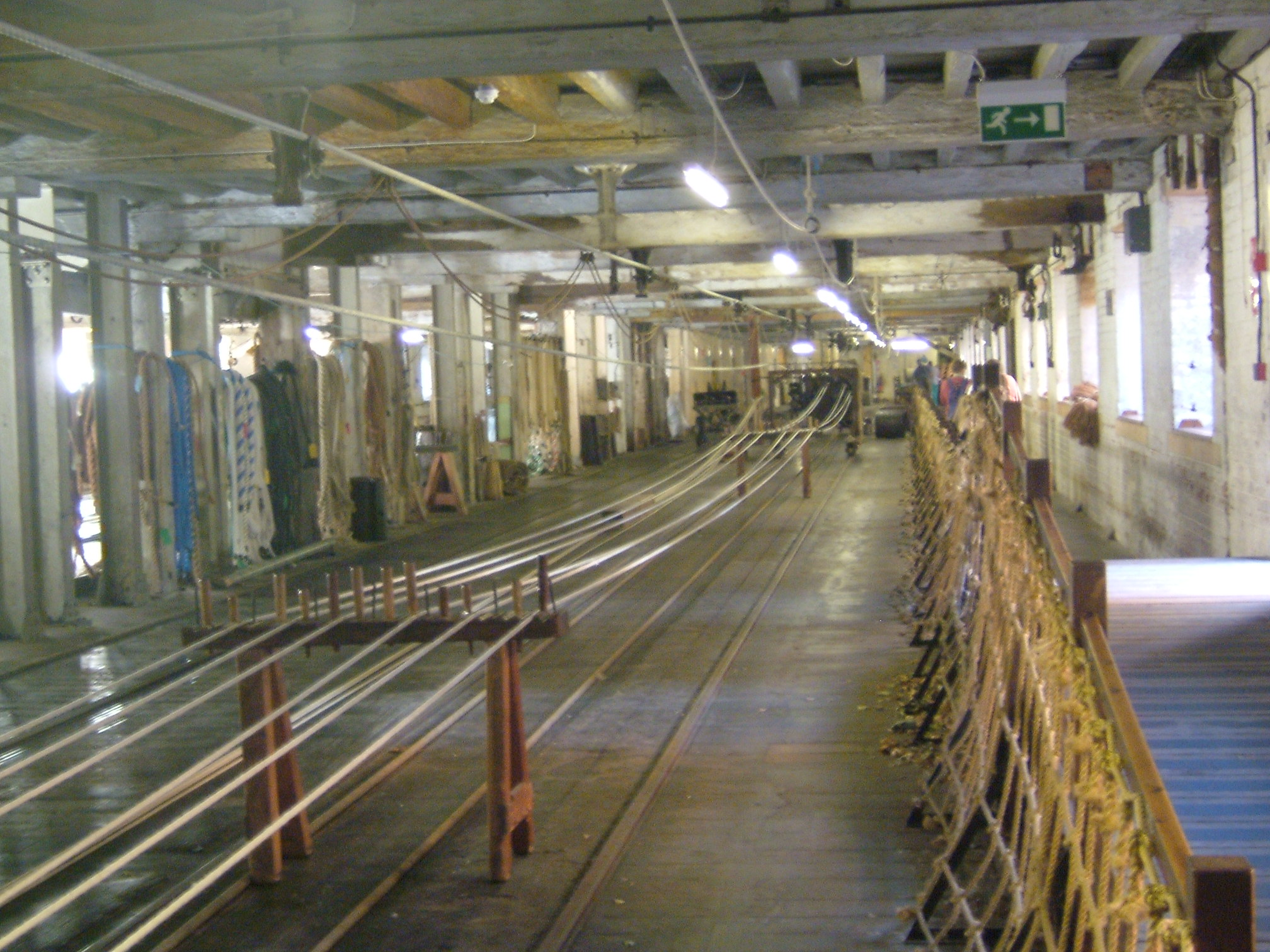
Looking at the Traveller

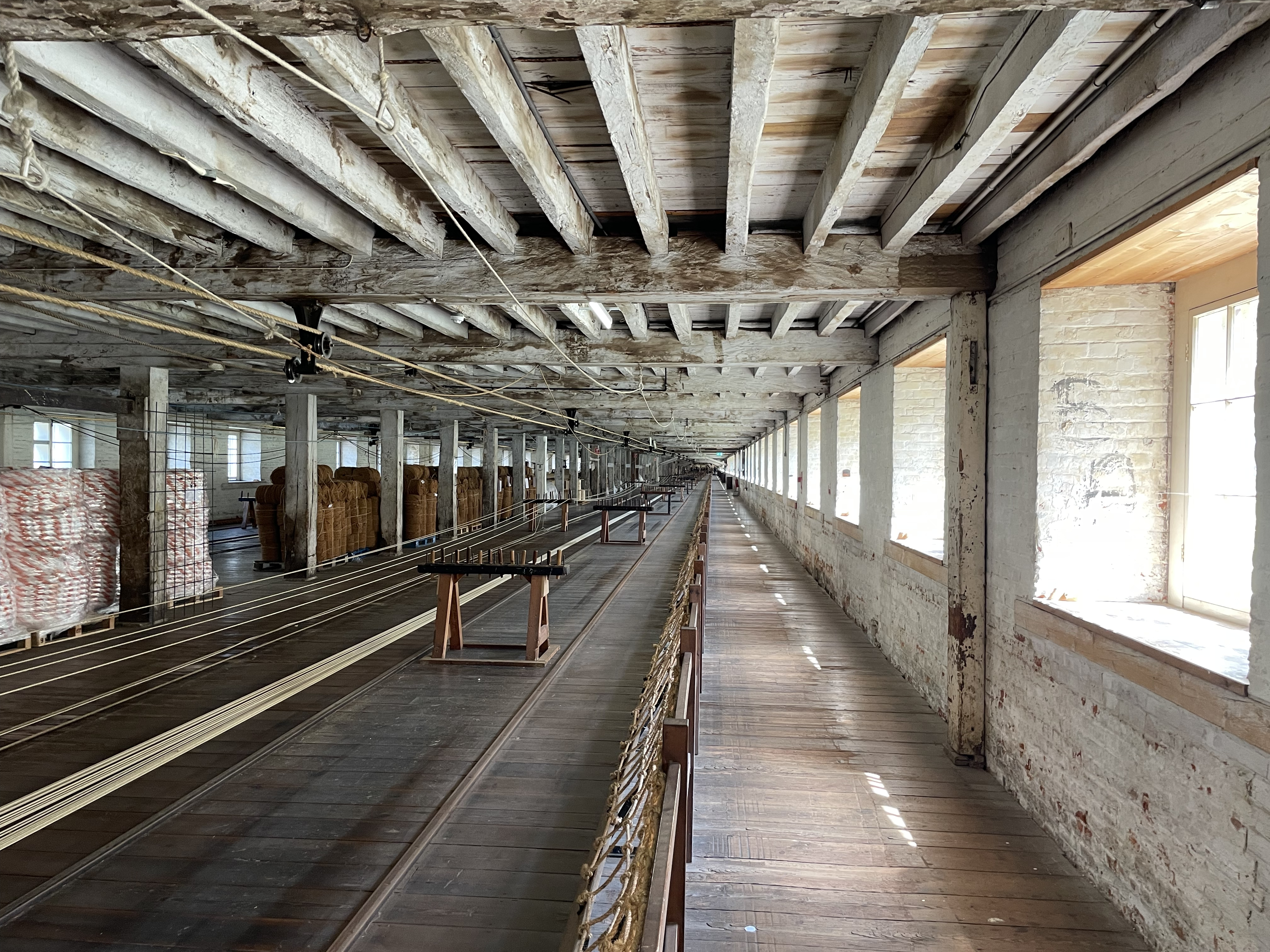
Looking from one end of the ropewalk to the other.

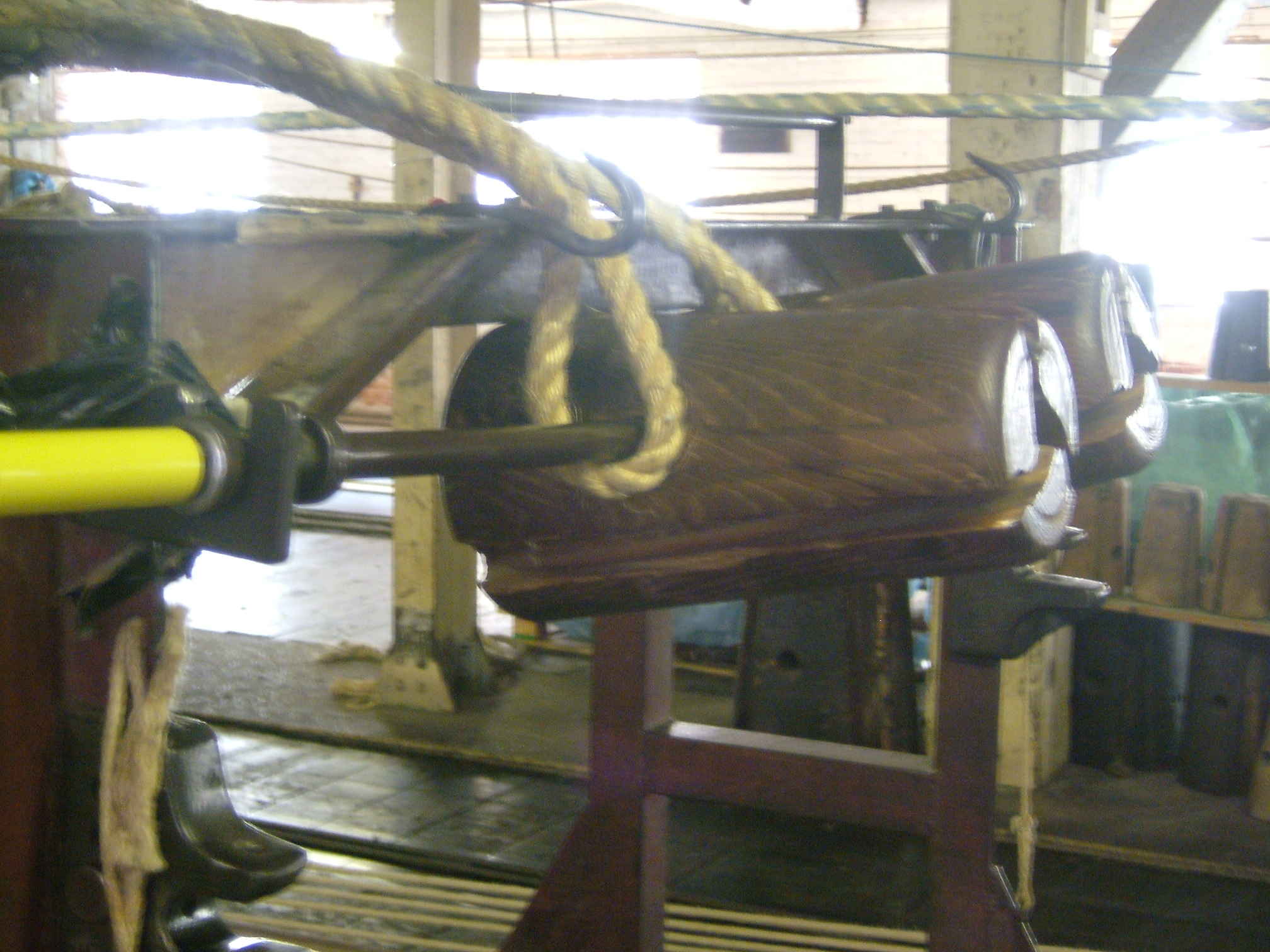
Tops

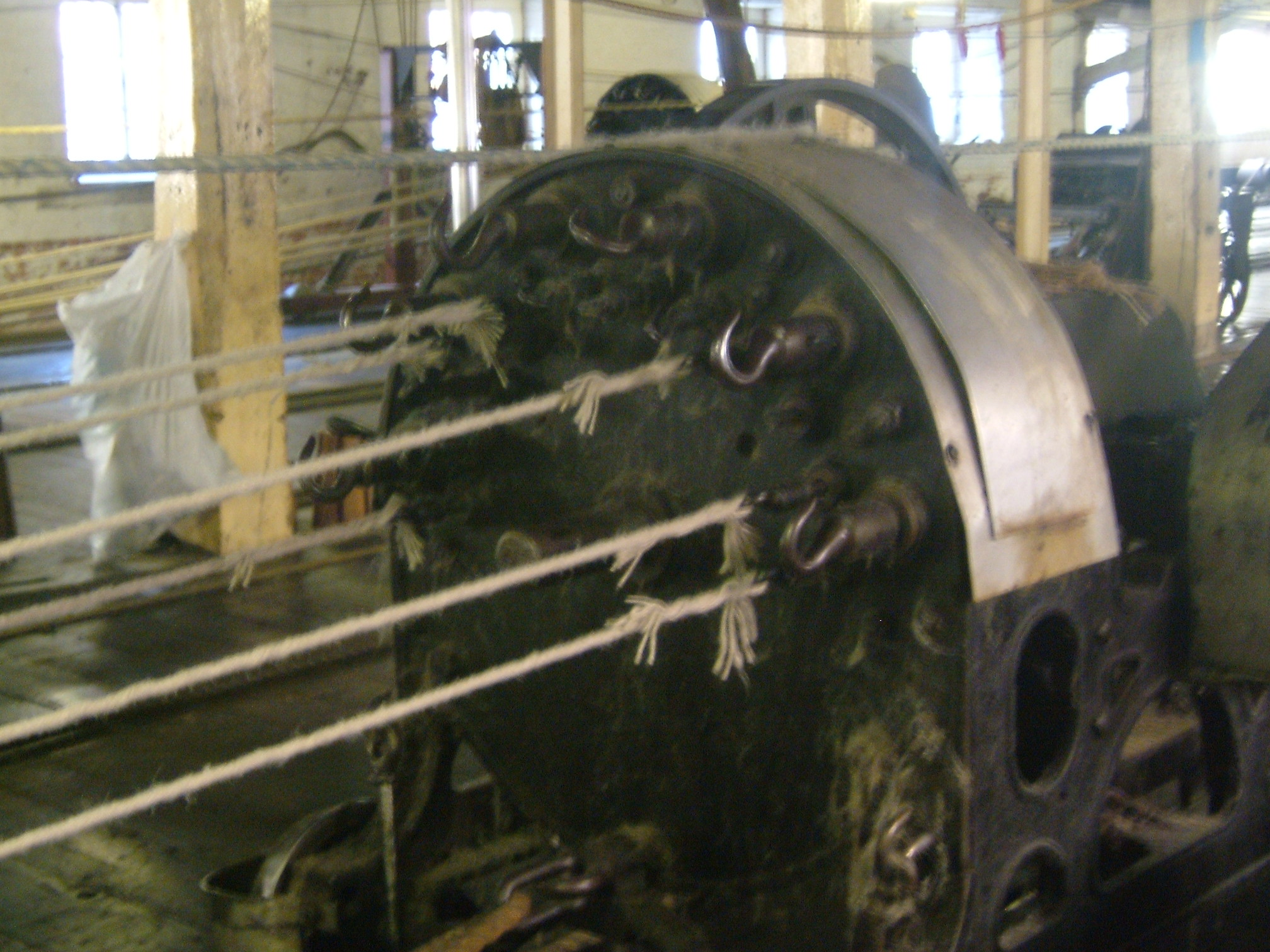
The Traveller

==== Metalwork ====
- No 1 Smithery 1808. Originally consisting of three ranges around an open courtyard, it was designed by Edward Holl and fitted out by John Rennie with 40 forges for production of Anchors and Chain. Anchors could weigh 72 hundredweight (3,658 kg), and were forged by hand. "Anchorsmiths" were given an allowance of 8 imperial pints (4.5 L) of strong beer a day, because of the difficult working conditions. In 1841 a beam engine was installed (in an extension to the north-east) to replace the manual bellows; another was added the following year. The courtyard was roofed over for a steam hammer shop in 1865.
- Lead and Paint Mill 1818. Designed by Edward Holl to be fireproof. There were a lead furnace, casting area and steam powered double rolling mill, paint mills for grinding pigment, canvas stretching frames, and vats for storing and boiling linseed oil. A warship was painted every 4 months.
- Iron Foundry 1855–61. Built immediately to the north of the Smithery (the intervening space was later infilled with the Smithery extension of 1867). Extended in connection with preparations for HMS Achilles (see below).
- No 1 Machine Shop 1861. This building retains it original structure and roof glazing. It was used to house the machine tools needed to produce HMS Achilles, the first iron battleship built in a Royal Dockyard. This building has now become home to the railway workshop.
- The Galvanising Shop c. 1890. Galvanising is a process of dipping steel in molten zinc to prevent it from rusting. There were baths of acid and molten zinc, the fumes vented through louvres in the roof.
- Chain Cable Shed c. 1900, built to protect newly manufactured anchor chain. The roof is supported by a row of 28 captured French and Spanish guns.
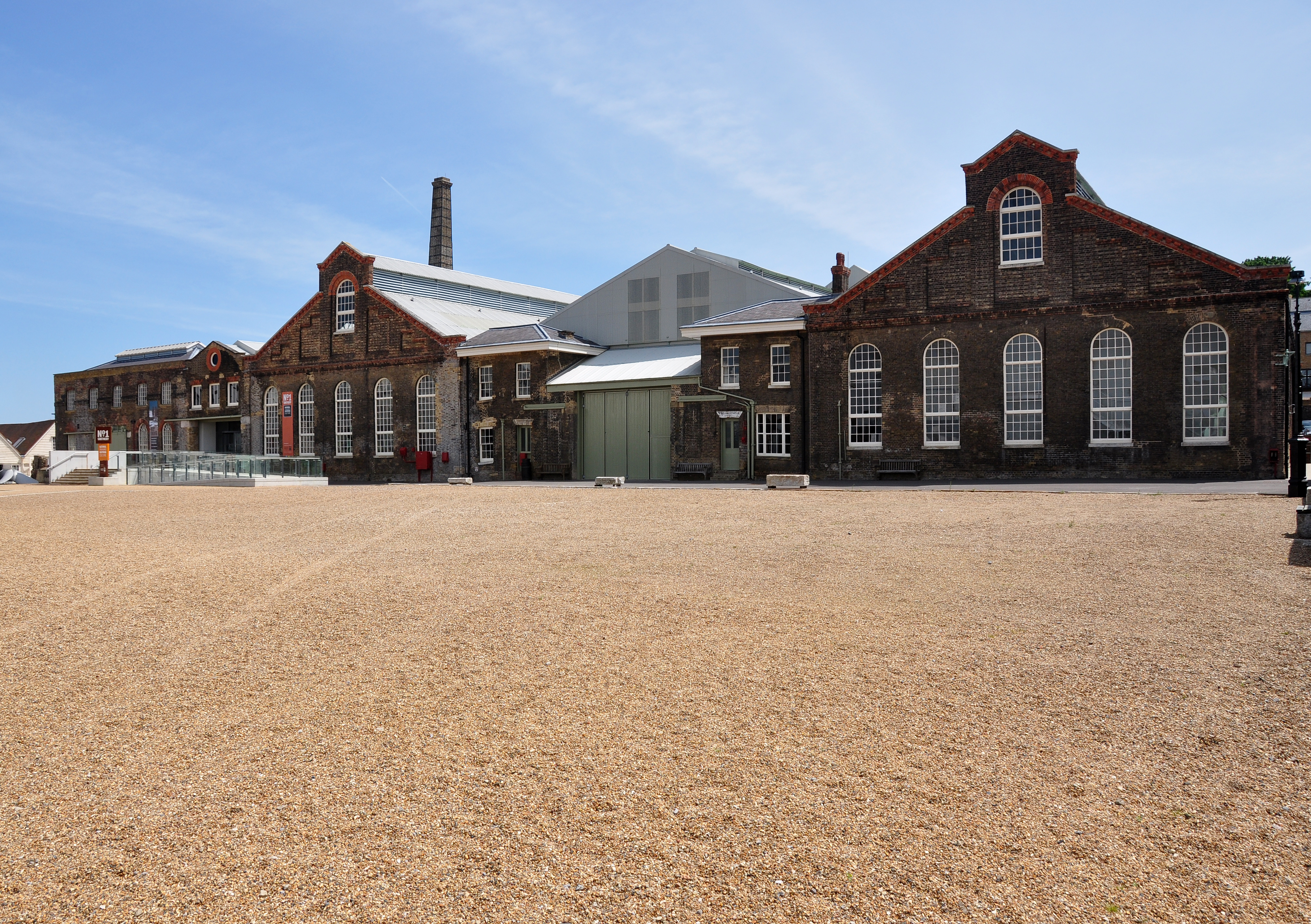
No 1 Smithery

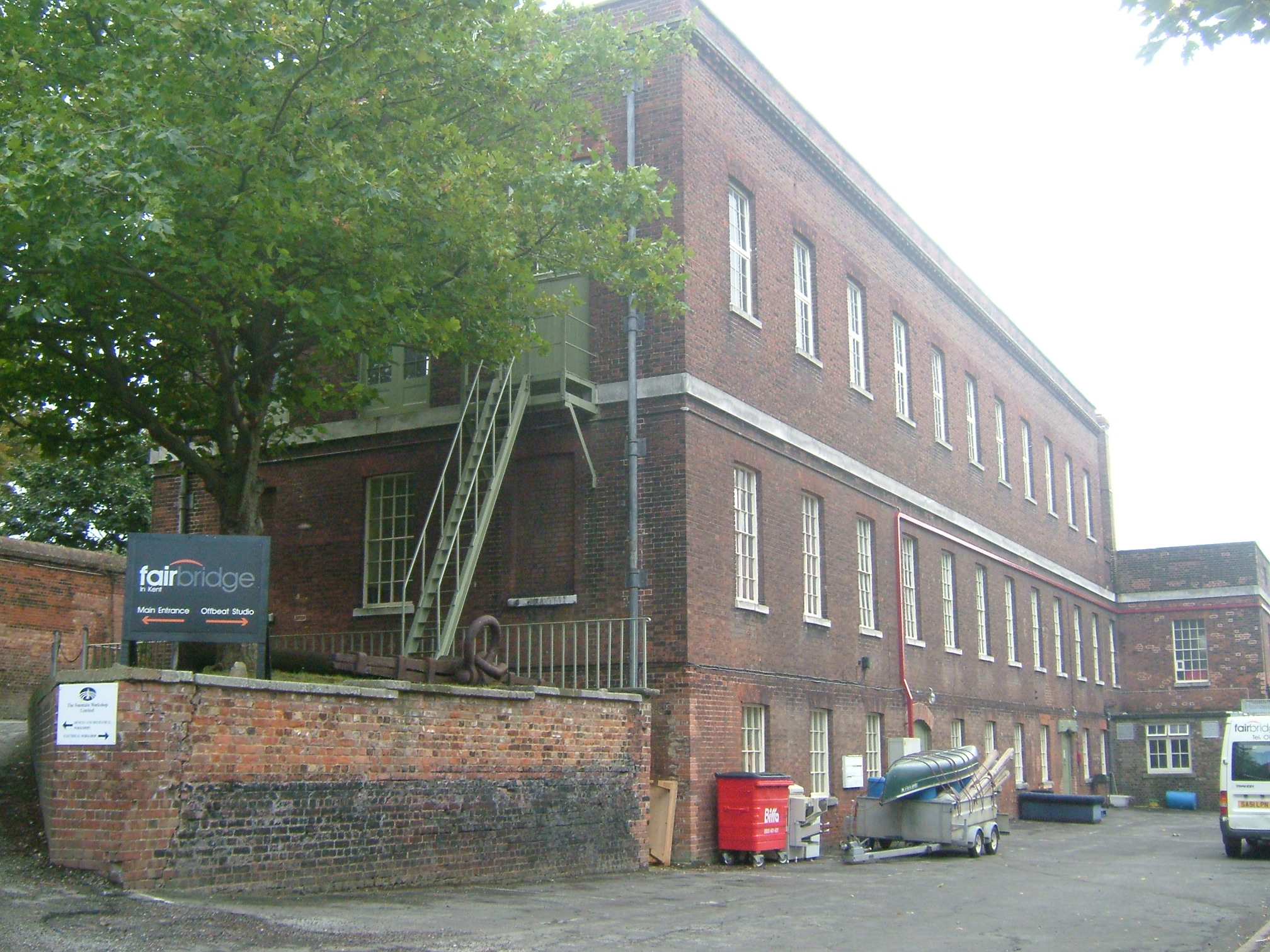
Lead and Paint Mill

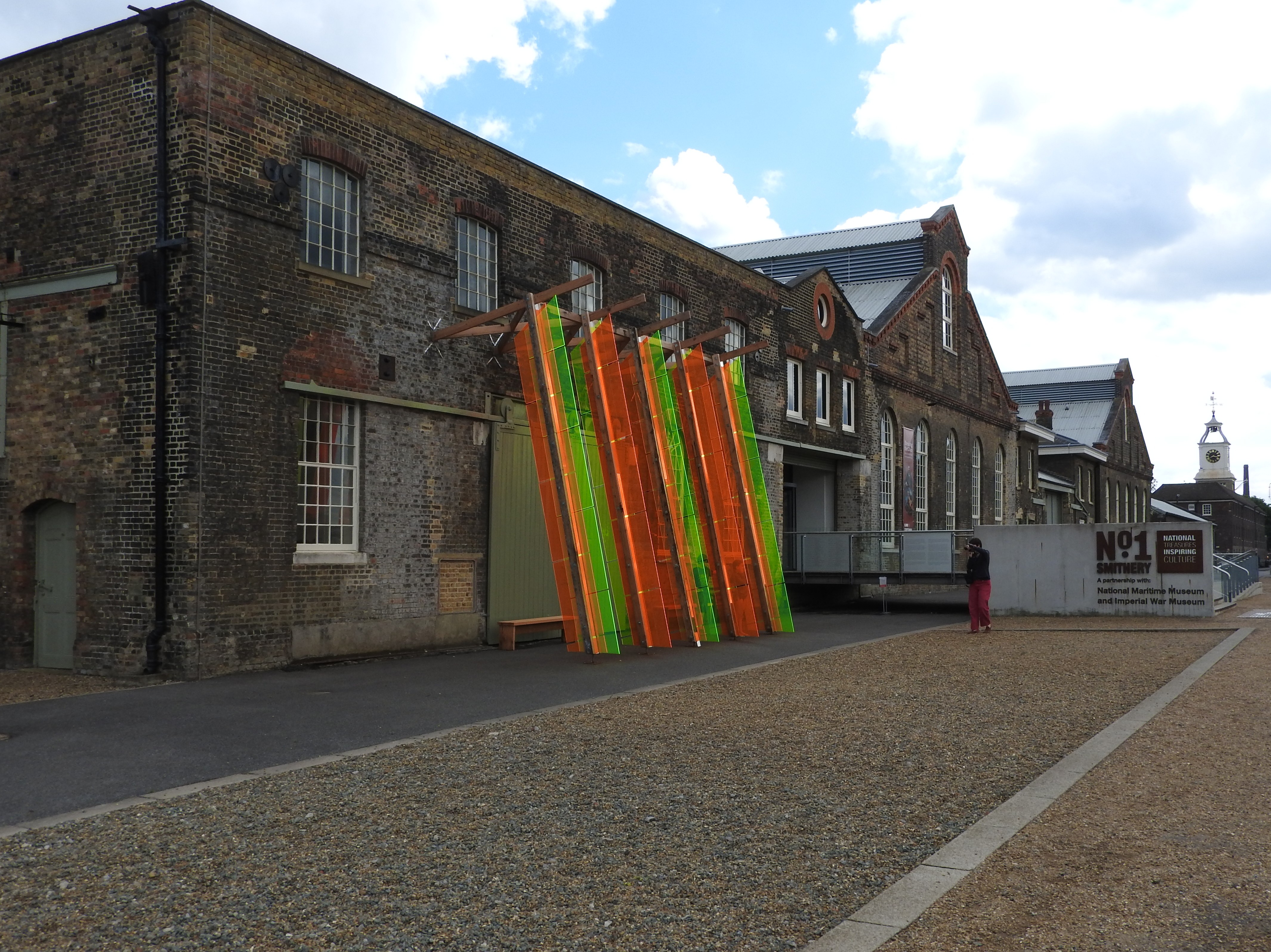
Iron Foundry (left)

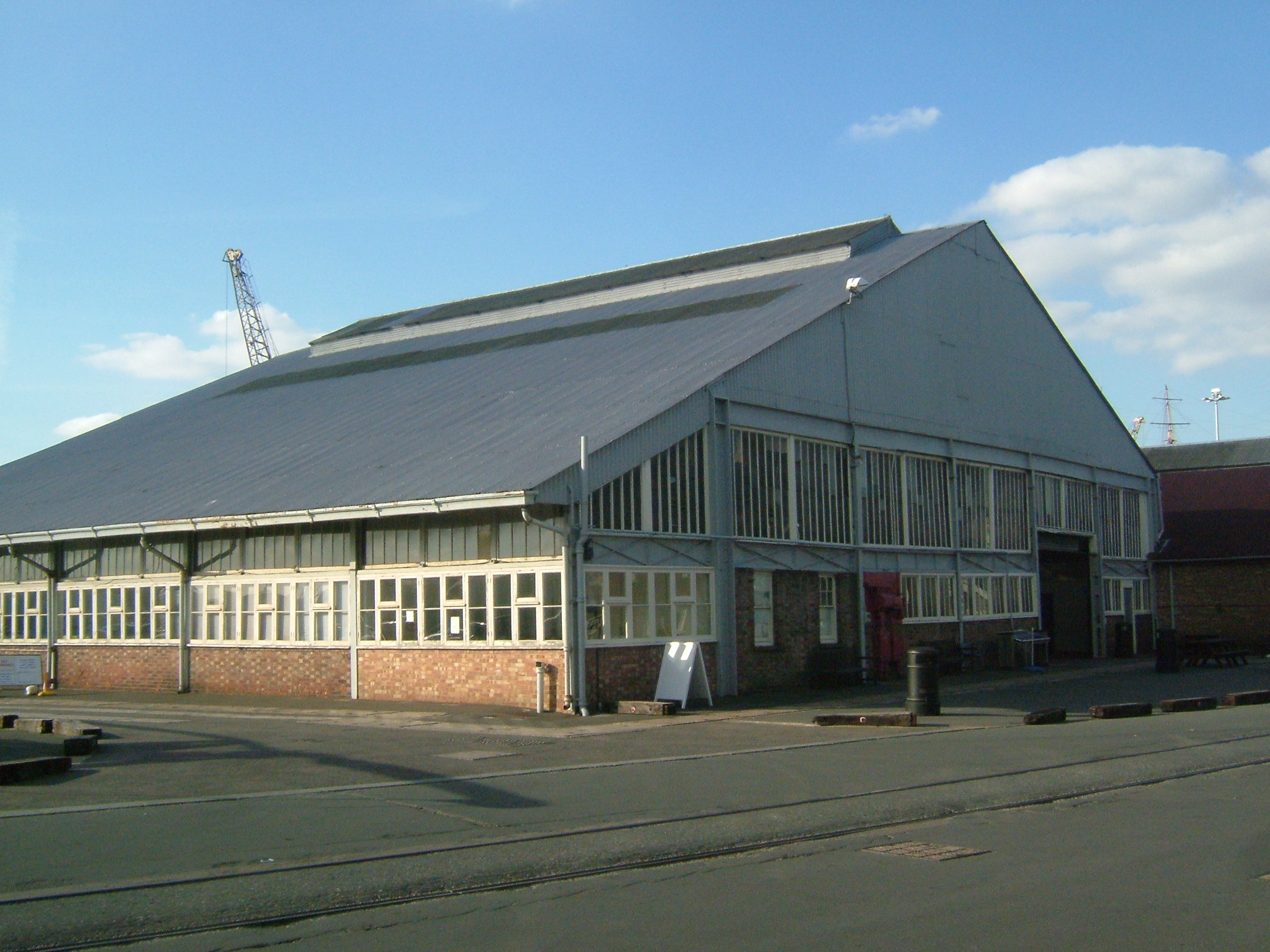
No 1 Machine Shop

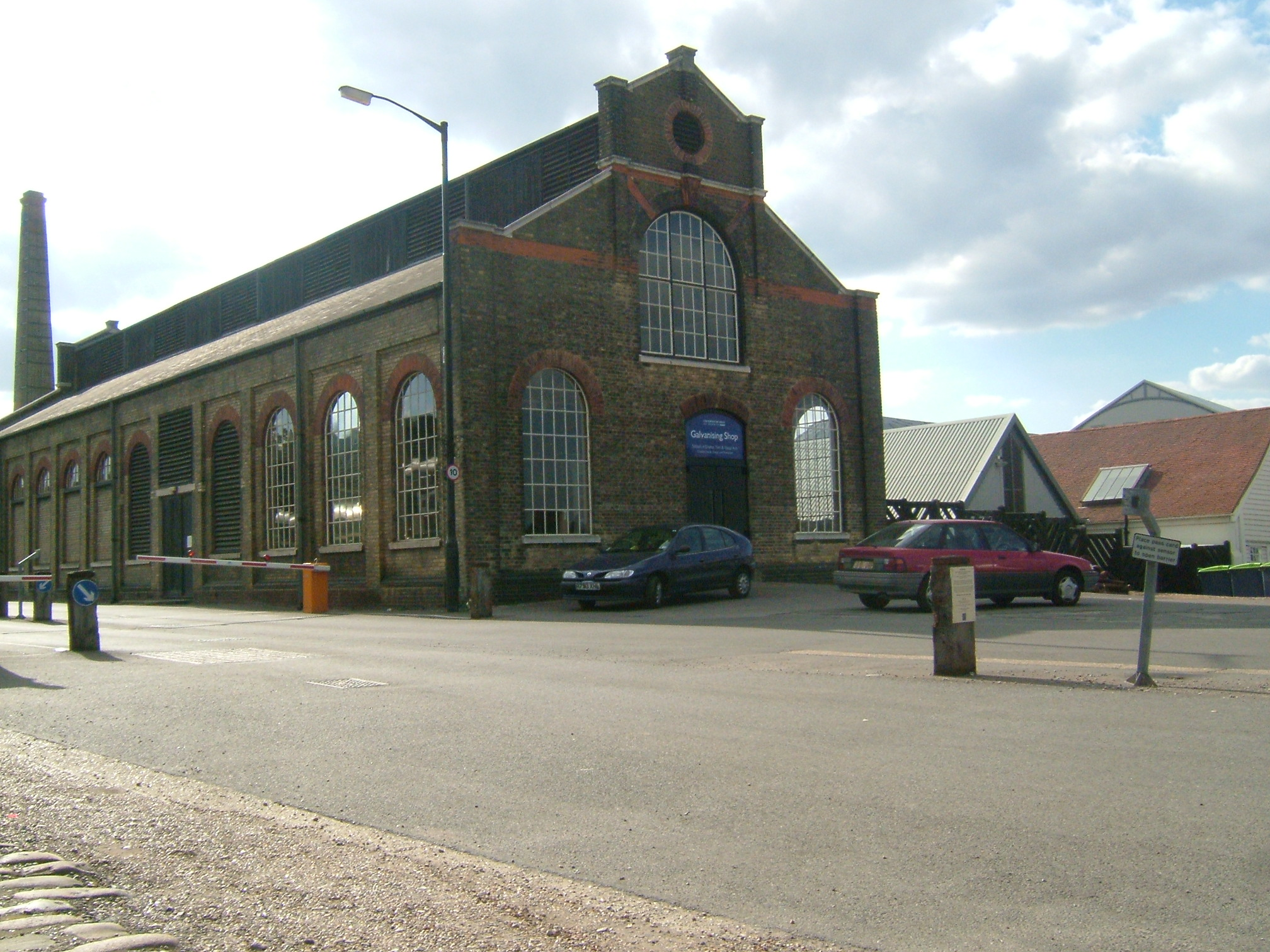
Galvanising Shop

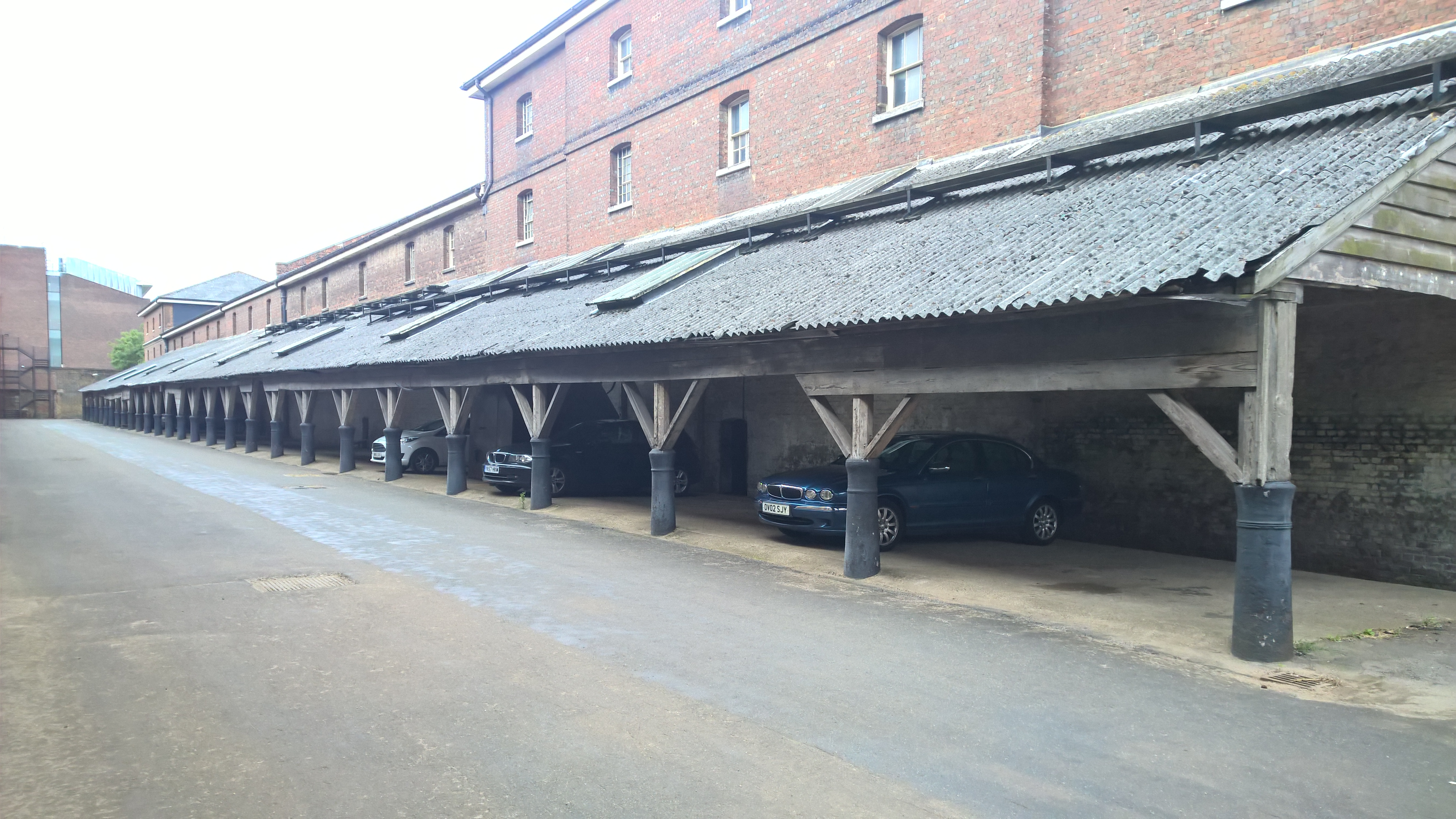
Chain Cable Shed

=== Surviving structures within the Victorian Steam Yard ===
The Victorian Steam Yard was built around three large Basins (wet docks), constructed between 1865 and 1885 along the line of St Mary's Creek (separating St Mary's Island from the mainland). It was envisaged that Basin No 1 would serve as a "repair basin", No 2 as the "factory basin" and No 3 as the "fitting-out" basin; a newly launched ship could therefore enter via the west lock, have any defects remedied in the first basin, have her steam engines and heavy machinery installed in the second, and then be finished, and loaded with coal and provisions, in the third before leaving via the east locks.

- Four drydocks (Nos 5–8) were constructed at the same time on the south side of No 1 Basin; all four were in use by 1873. The yard's Steam Factory complex was built at around the same time; most of its buildings were sited around these docks (rather than by Basin No 2 as had originally been planned).
- No 1 Boiler Shop and No 8 Machine Shop were originally built as slip covers at Woolwich Dockyard in the 1840s. When that Dockyard closed in 1869 they were dismantled and rebuilt at Chatham alongside the new dry docks. Only the framework survives of the Machine Shop, but the Boiler Shop was renovated in 2003 to house the Dockyard Outlet shopping centre. A third such structure from Woolwich, similar in design to the boiler shop, stood nearby and served as a fitting shop; it was demolished in 1990.
- Dock Pumping Station 1874: as well as serving to empty dry docks 5–8 when required, its accumulator tower provided hydraulic power for the adjacent cranes, capstans and caissons. Two other pumping stations served a similar purpose (one for dock 9 and one for the two east locks) but they have not survived.
- Combined Ship Trade Office 1880: now the "Ship & Trades" public house.
- A fifth dry dock (No 9) was added in 1895 on the north side of No 1 Basin, opposite the other four, to accommodate the new, larger battleships which were then under construction. It was completed in 1903.
- The 100 ft bell mast was erected in 1903 alongside the Dockyard's Pembroke Gate, where it was used to signal the start of each working day. (A similar but older mast fulfilled the same function alongside the main gate in the Georgian part of the Yard.) The 1903 mast had originally served as foremast to HMS Undaunted. In 1992 it had been dismantled, but was re-erected, a short distance from its original location, in 2001. Apart from the two Chatham examples, only one other is believed to have survived: in Devonport's Morice Ordnance Yard.
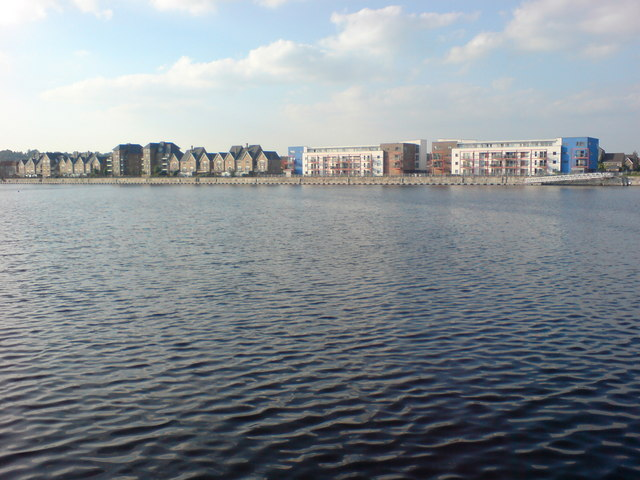
Expanse of water in No 2 Basin

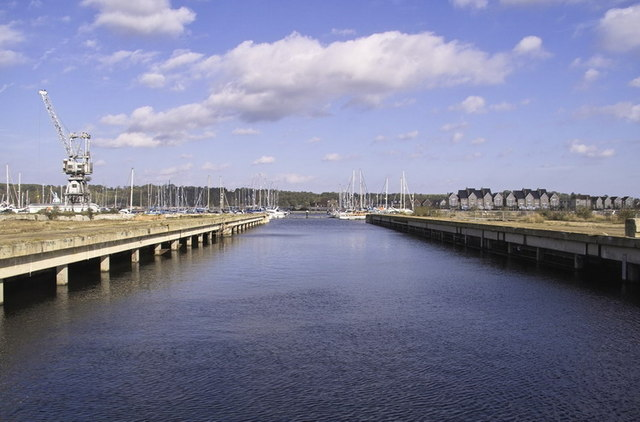
View down the length of the former No 7 Dock towards No 1 Basin (now Chatham Marina)

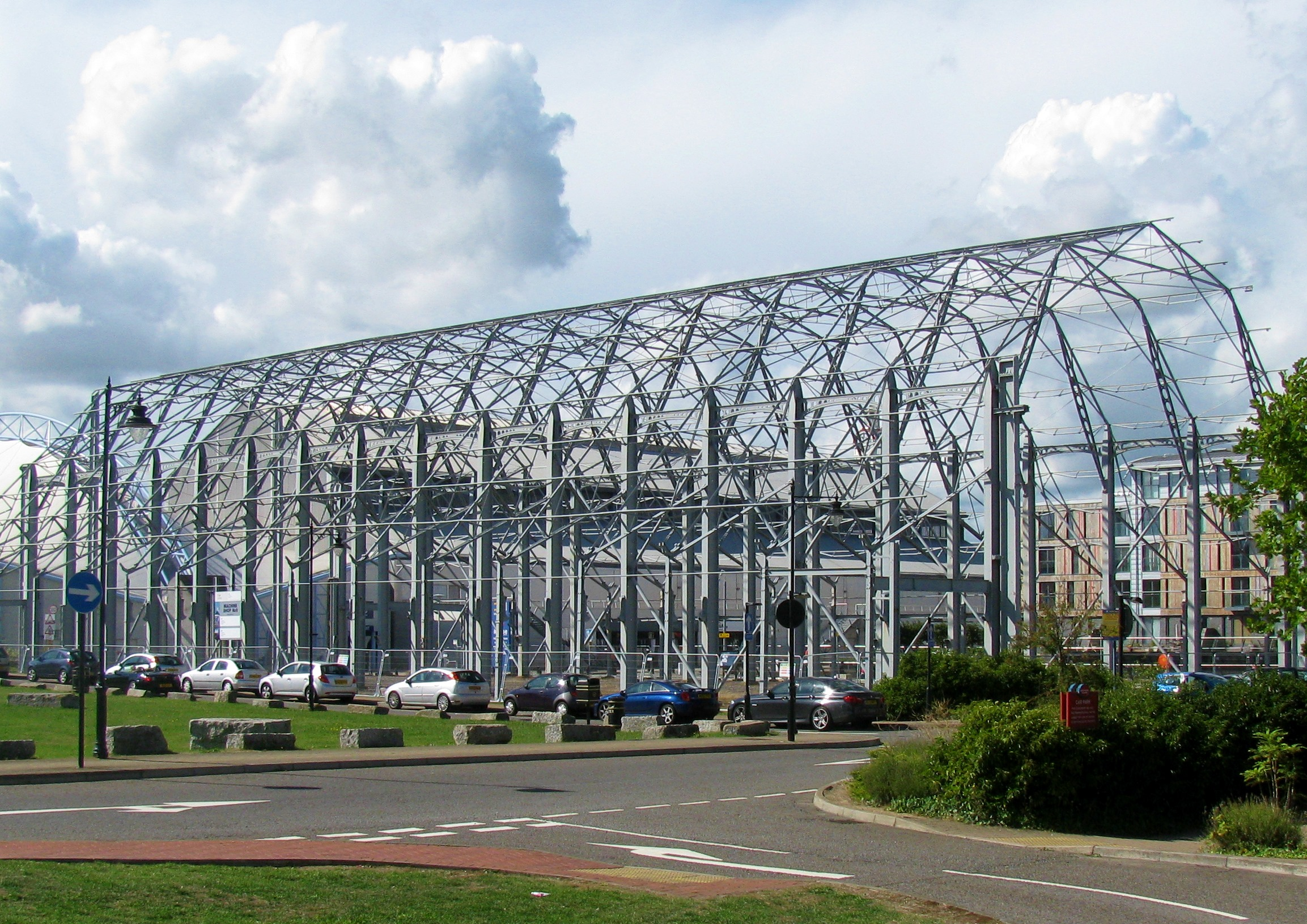
Remains of No 8 Machine Shop with No 1 Boiler Shop behind it

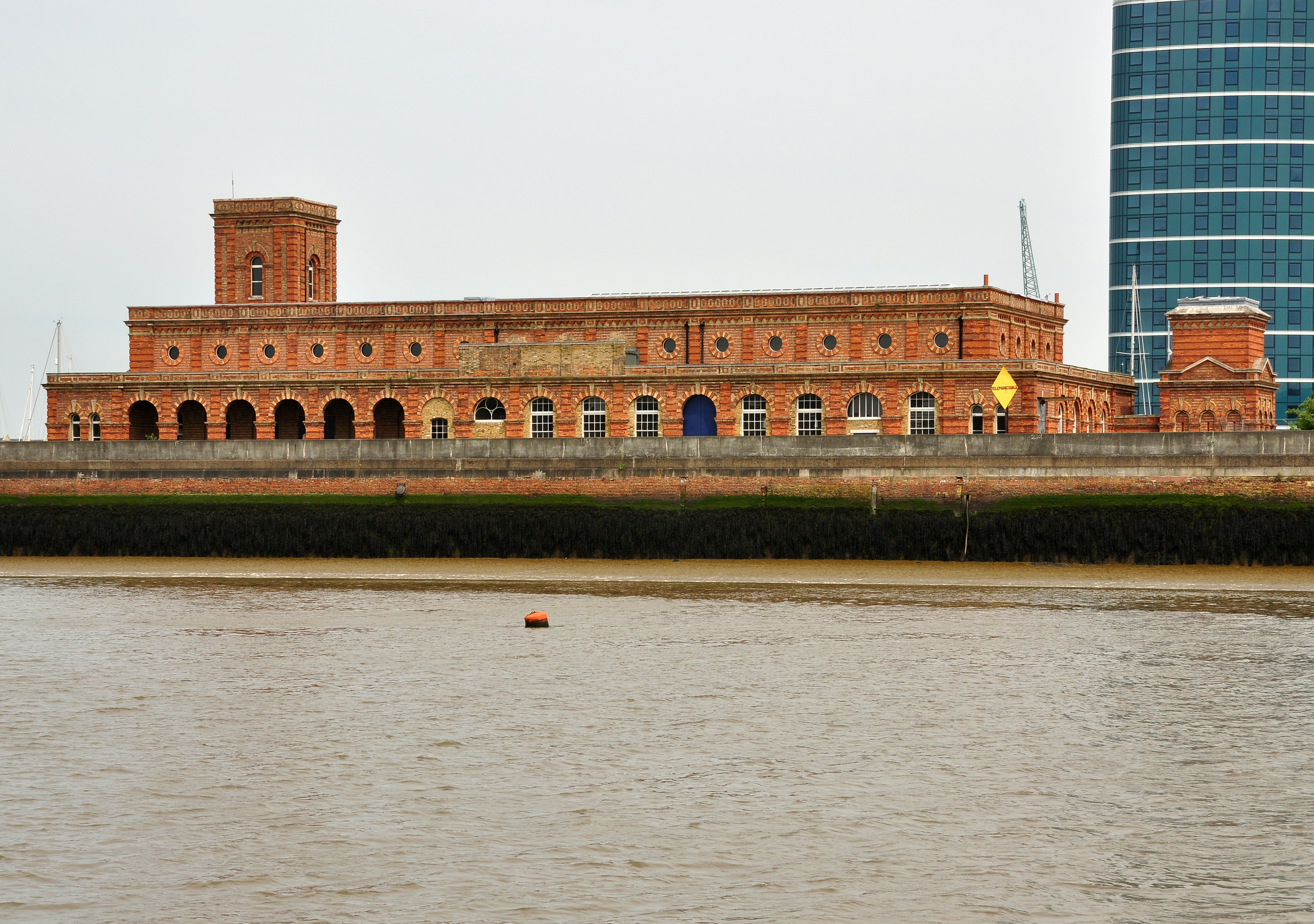
Dock pumping station (its 80 ft chimney, formerly on the plinth to the right, has been removed)

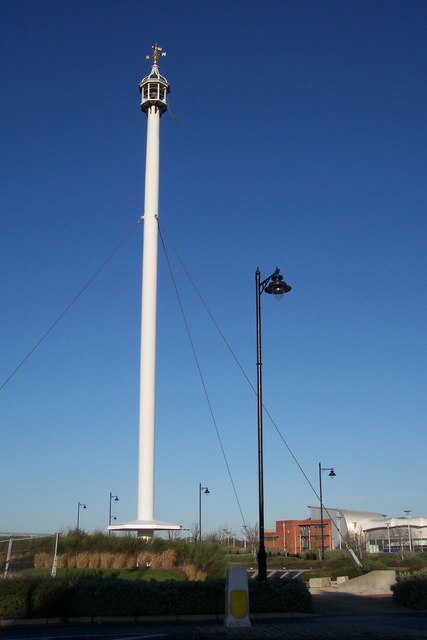
Bell Mast on Leviathan Way

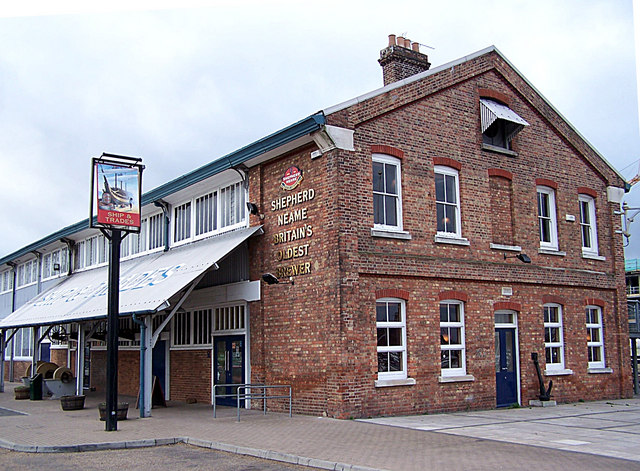
Combined Ship Trade Office

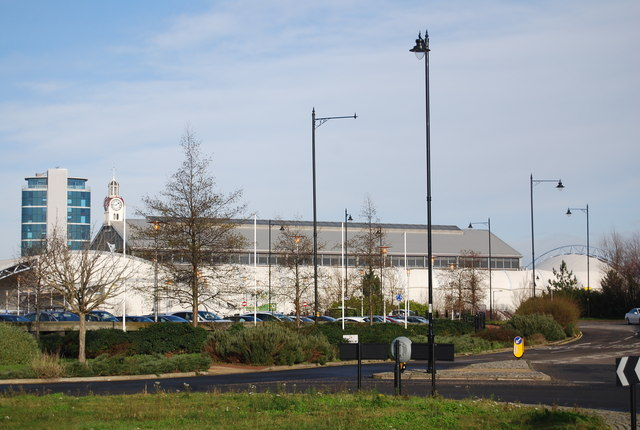
Former No 1 Boiler Shop (with clock)

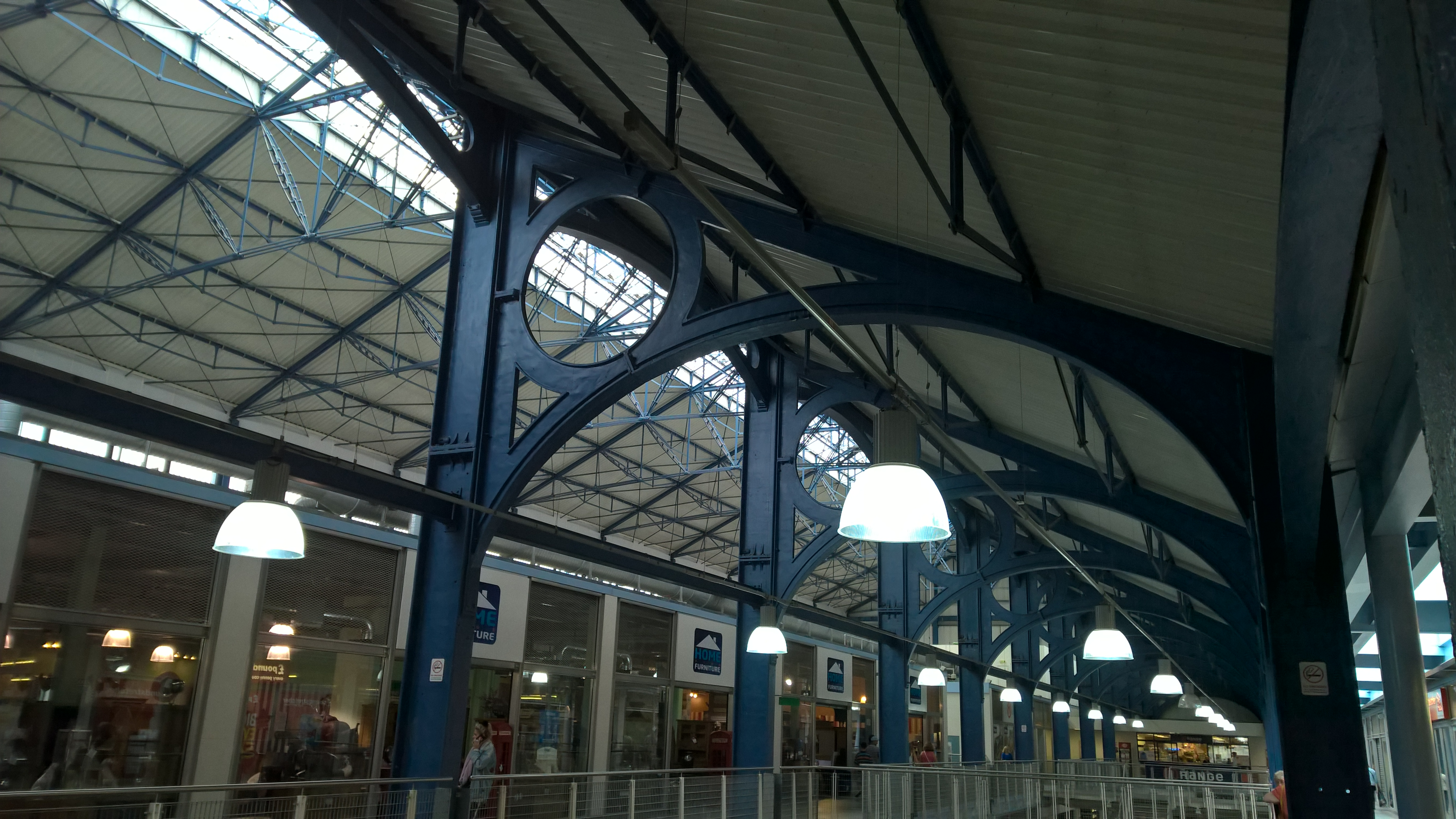
Former No 1 Boiler Shop (interior)

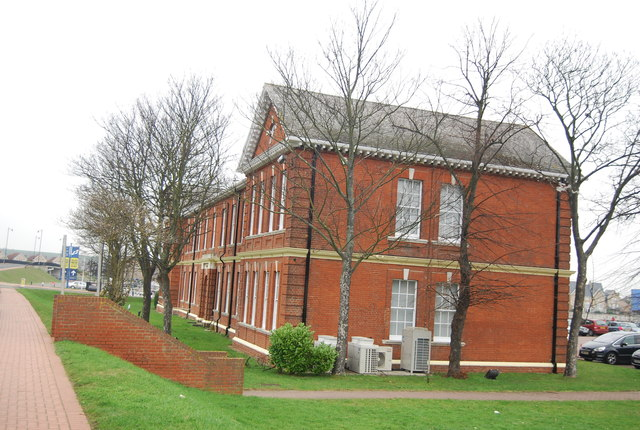
Former central offices

== Administration of the dockyard ==
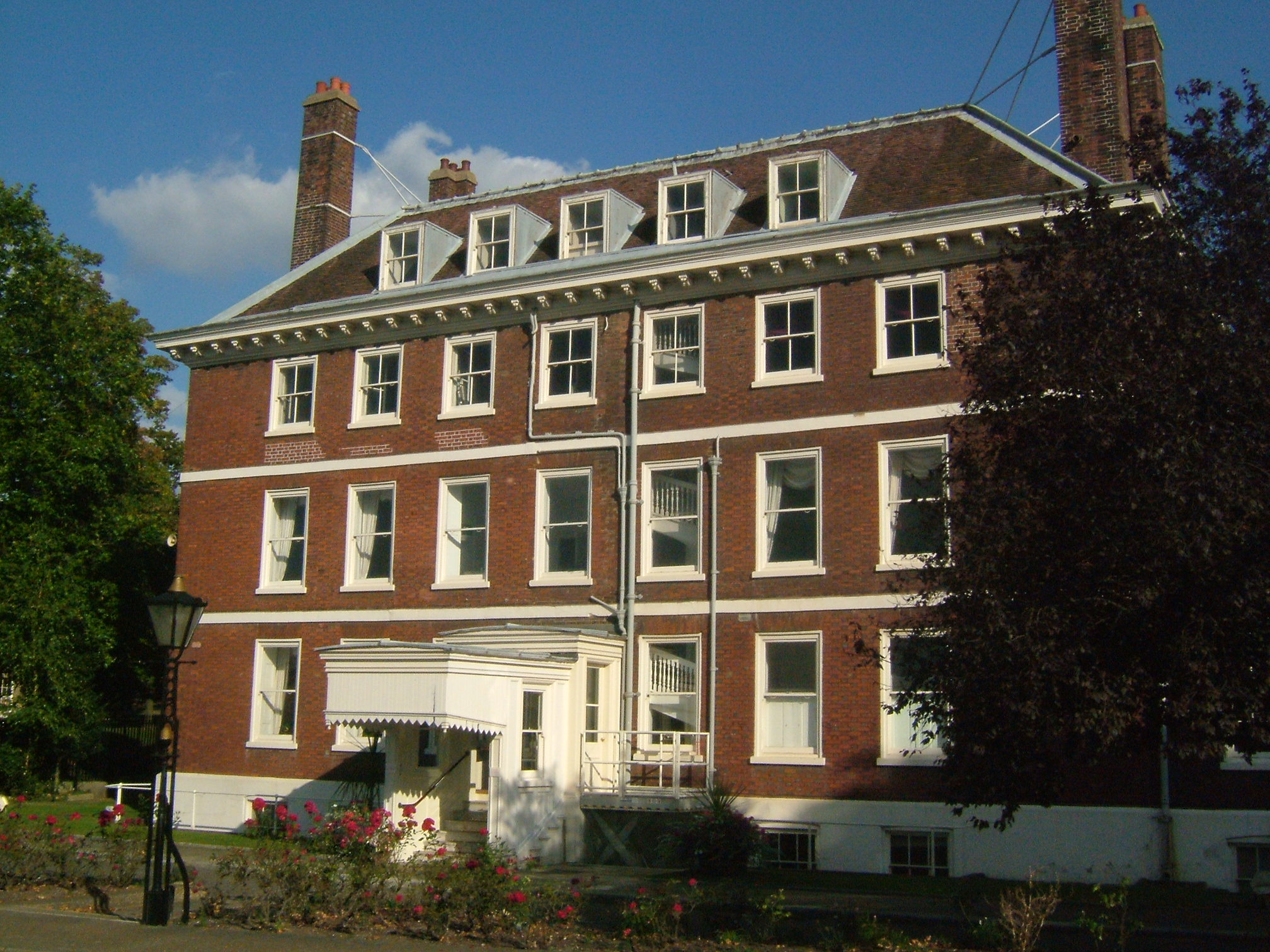
The Commissioner's House (1704), was built for Captain George St Lo, who found the previous house unsuitable. It remains the oldest surviving naval building in England.

=== Resident Commissioners of the Navy Board ===
The Commissioner of Chatham Dockyard held a seat and a vote on the Navy Board in London. The Commissioners were:

- 1631–1647 Phineas Pett
- 1648–1668 Peter Pett
- 1669–1672 John Cox
- 1672–1686 Thomas Middleton
- 1686–1689 Phineas Pett
- 1689–1703 Sir Edward Gregory
- 1703–1714 George St Lo
- 1714–1722 Rear-Admiral James Lyttleton
- 1722–1736 Captain Thomas Kempthorne
- 1736–1742 Captain Thomas Mathews
- 1742–1754 Captain Charles Brown
- 1754–1755 Captain Arthur Scott
- 1755–1763 Captain Thomas Cooper
- 1763–1771 Captain Thomas Hanway
- 1771–1799 Charles Proby
- 1799–1801 John Hartwell
- 1801–1808 Captain Charles Hope
- 1808–1823 Captain Robert Barlow
- 1823–1829 Captain Charles Cunningham
- 1829–1830, Captain John Mason
- 1830–1832, Captain Charles Bullen

In 1832 the post of commissioner was replaced by the post of superintendent, who was invested with the same power and authority as the former commissioners, "except in matters requiring an Act of Parliament to be submitted by the Commissioner of the Navy".

=== Admiral/Captain superintendents ===
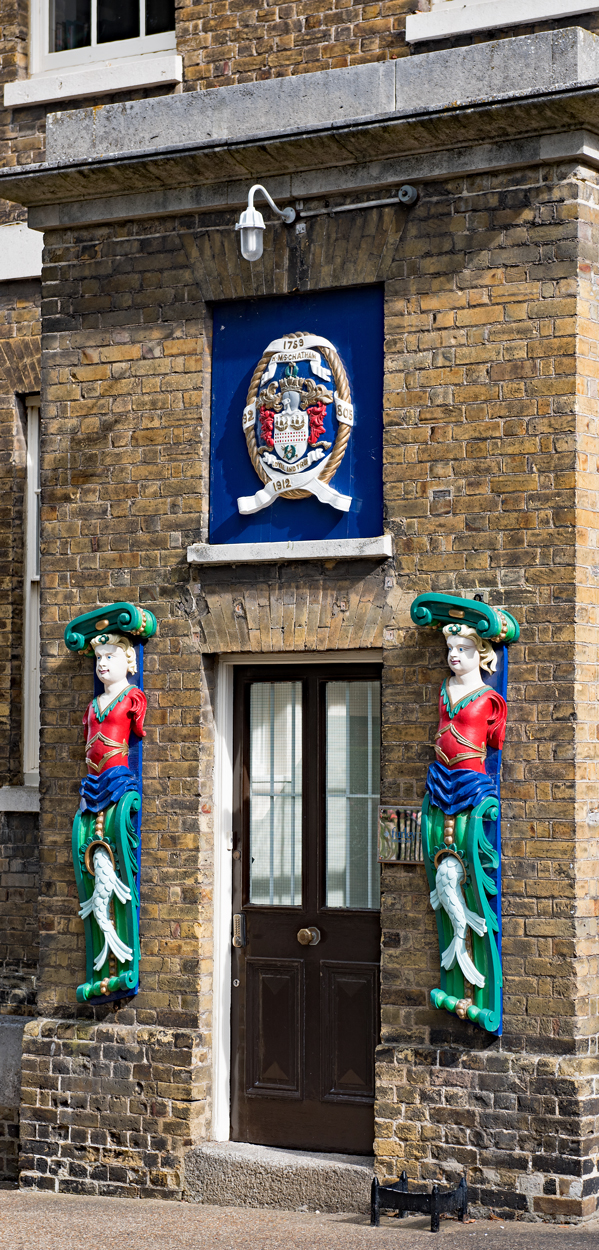
Admiral's offices, Chatham Dockyard

- Captain Sir James A. Gordon, July 1832 – 10 January 1837
- Captain John Clavell, 12 April 1837 – 24 August 1841
- Captain Sir Thomas Bourchier, 20 September 1846 – 5 May 1849
- Captain Peter Richards, 5 May 1849 – 14 June 1854
- Captain Christopher Wyvill, 14 June 1854 – 1 April 1861
- Captain Edward G. Fanshawe, 1 April 1861 – 9 November 1863,
- Captain William Houston Stewart, 19 November 1863 to 30 November 1868
- Captain William Charles Chamberlain, 30 November 1868 – 19 January 1874
- Captain Charles Fellowes, 19 January 1874 – 1876
- Rear-Admiral Thomas Brandreth, 1 February 1879 – 1 December 1881
- Rear-Admiral George W. Watson, 1 December 1881 – April 1886
- Rear-Admiral William Codrington, April 1886 – 1 November 1887
- Rear-Admiral Edward Kelly, 1 November 1887 – December 1890
- Vice-Admiral George D. Morant, 25 January 1892
- Rear-Admiral Hilary G. Andoe, 2 September 1895
- Rear-Admiral Swinton Colthurst Holland, 2 September 1899 – 2 September 1902
- Vice-Admiral Robert William Craigie, 2 September 1902 – 2 September 1905
- Rear-Admiral Alvin C. Corry, 2 September 1905
- Vice-Admiral George A. Giffard, 5 February 1907 – 9 August 1909
- Rear-Admiral Robert N. Ommanney, 9 August 1909 – 9 August 1912
- Rear-Admiral Charles E. Anson, 9 August 1912 – 9 August 1915
- Captain Harry Jones, 16 August 1913 – 15 September 1913
- Vice-Admiral Arthur D. Ricardo, 9 August 1915 – 1 May 1919
- Rear-Admiral Sir William E. Goodenough, 1 May 1919 – 26 May 1920
- Rear-Admiral Lewis Clinton-Baker, 26 May 1920
- Rear-Admiral Edward B. Kiddle, 28 September 1921 – 1 December 1923
- Rear-Admiral Percy M. R. Royds, 1 December 1923
- Rear-Admiral Charles P. Beaty-Pownall, 7 December 1925 – 7 December 1927
- Rear-Admiral Anselan J. B. Stirling, 7 December 1927
- Vice-Admiral Charles W. Round-Turner, October 1931 – October 1935
- Vice-Admiral Sir Clinton F. S. Danby, 1 October 1935 – 15 October 1942
- Vice-Admiral John G. Crace, 15 October 1942 – July 1946
- Sir Gervase Boswell Middleton, July 1946 – September 1950
- Rear-Admiral A.L. Poland, 5 September 1950 – May 1951
- Rear-Admiral George V.M. Dolphin: October 1954 – October 1958
- Rear-Admiral John Y. Thompson: October 1958 – February 1961

After the abolition of the post of Commander-in-Chief, The Nore, Chatham's Admiral Superintendent took on the additional role of local Flag Officer (with local command responsibilities) and the title Flag Officer, Medway.

=== Flag Officer, Medway and Admiral Superintendent ===
Included:

- Rear-Admiral I.William T. Beloe: February 1961 – December 1963
- Rear-Admiral Ian L.T.Hogg: December 1963 – July 1966
- Vice-Admiral Sir W. John Parker: July 1966 – September 1969
- Rear-Admiral Frederick C.W. Lawson: September 1969 – November 1971

On 5 September 1971 all Flag Officers of the Royal Navy holding positions of Admiral Superintendents at Royal Dockyards were redesignated as Port Admirals. While they retained command over the naval personnel on site, and responsibility for the base as a whole, their oversight of the work of the dockyard was transferred to new civilian Dockyard General Managers, who had management responsibility across all Departments.

=== Flag Officer, Medway and Port Admiral ===
- Rear-Admiral Colin C.H. Dunlop: November 1971 – January 1974
- Rear-Admiral Stephen F. Berthon: January 1974 – July 1976
- Rear-Admiral Christopher M. Bevan: July 1976 – August 1978
- Rear-Admiral Charles B. Williams: August 1978 – August 1980
- Rear-Admiral George M.K. Brewer: August 1980 – August 1982
- Rear-Admiral William A. Higgins: August 1982 – 1983

== The Gun Wharf ==
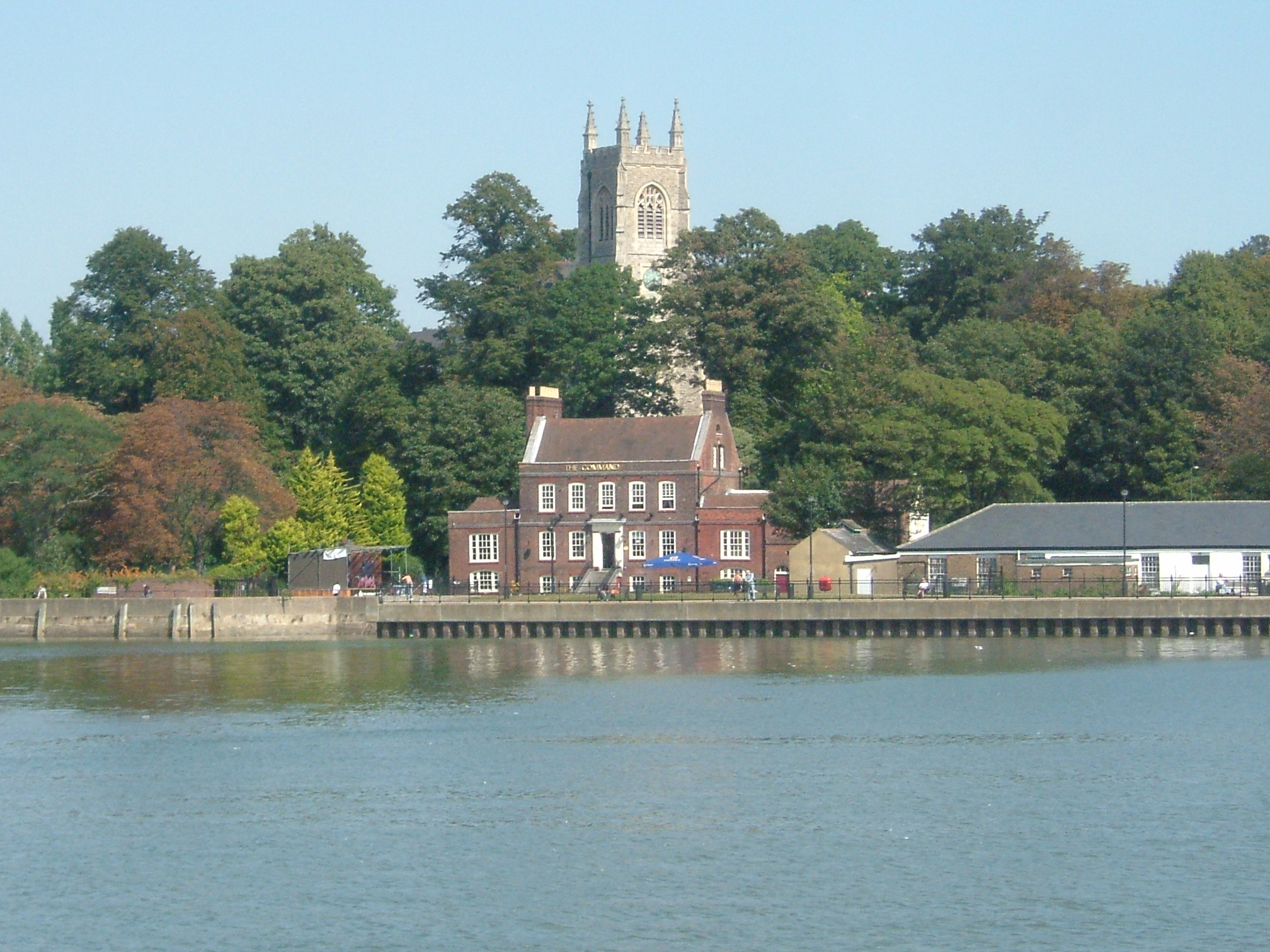
The Ordnance Storekeeper's house at the heart of the former Gun Wharf

An Ordnance Yard was established in the 17th century immediately upriver of the Dockyard (on the site of the original Tudor yard, vacated in 1622). The yard would have received, stored and issued cannons and gun-carriages (along with projectiles, accoutrements and also all manner of small arms) for ships based in the Medway, as well as for local artillery emplacements and for army use. (Gunpowder, on the other hand, was received, stored and issued across the river at Upnor Castle.)

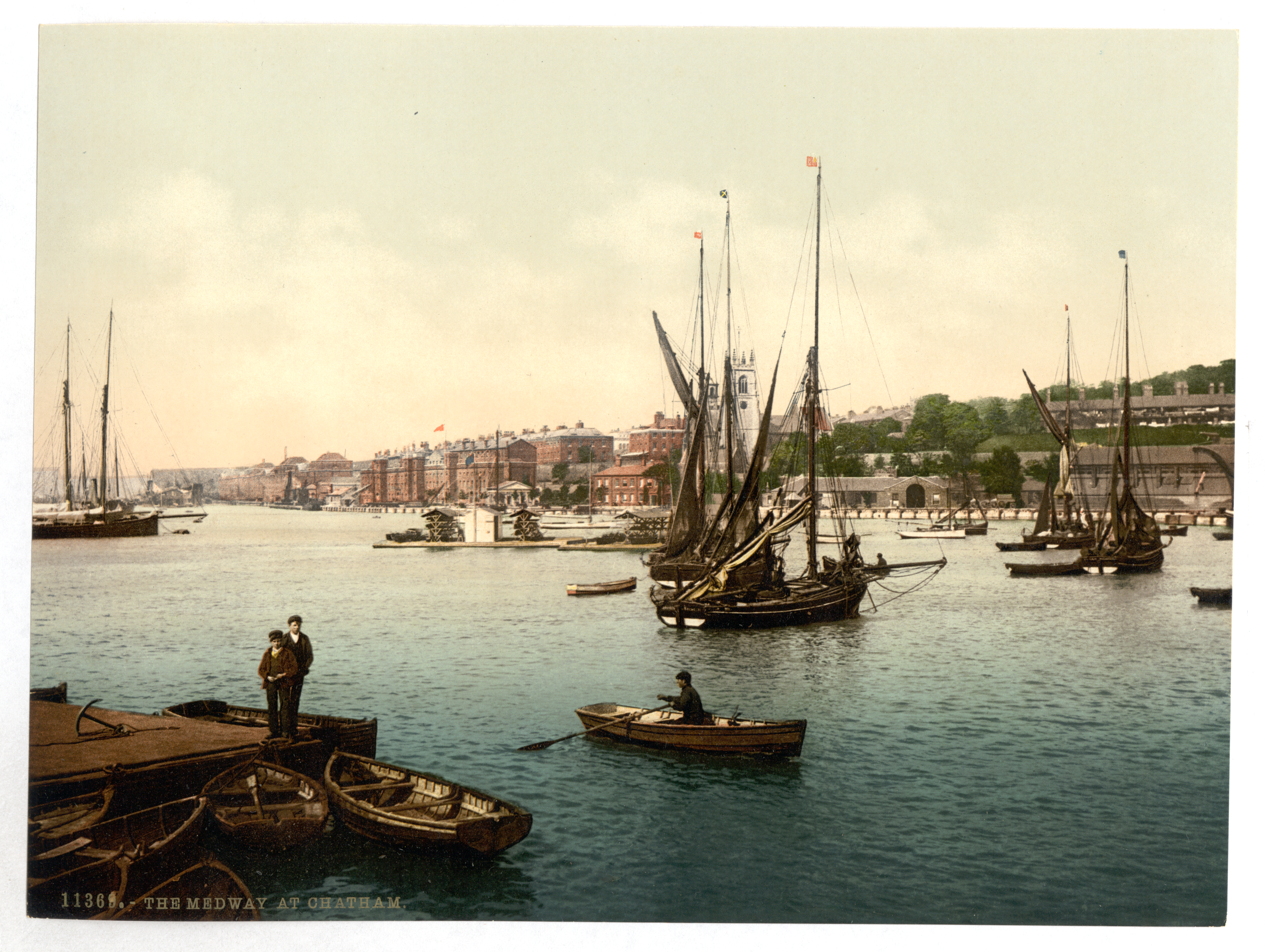
The Gun Wharf, c. 1890: the 1717 Grand Store can be seen left of centre (with the Dockyard's Anchor Wharf storehouse in the distance beyond). The surviving carpenters' shop and machine shop are on the right.

A plan of 1704 shows (from north to south) a long Storehouse parallel to the river, the Storekeeper's house (the Storekeeper was the senior officer of the Yard) and a pair of Carriage Stores. In 1717 the original Storehouse was replaced with the Grand Store (a much larger three-storey building, contemporary with and of a similar style to, the Main Gatehouse in the Dockyard). Not long afterwards a large new single-storey Carriage Store, with a long frontage parallel to the river, was constructed, adjoining the Storekeeper's House to the south.

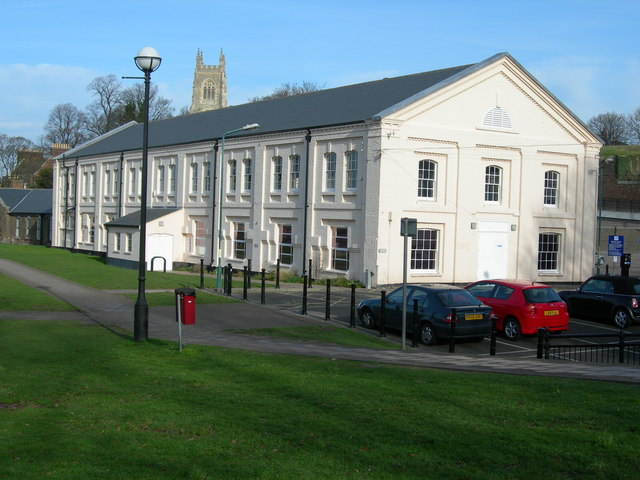
The Library (former machine shop)

After the demise of the Board of Ordnance (1855), Ordnance Yards passed under the control of the War Office, and were eventually (in 1891) apportioned to either the Army or the Navy. Chatham's yard was split in two, the area south of the Storekeeper's House becoming an Army Ordnance Store, and the rest a Navy Ordnance Store. It remained thus until 1958 when the yards were closed (the Army depot having served latterly as an atomic weapons research laboratory). Most of the 18th-century buildings were demolished, with the exception of the Storekeeper's House of 1719, which survives as the Command House public house. A few later buildings have survived: a long brick shed of 1805, southwest of the Command House, which once housed carpenters, wheelwrights and other workers as well as stores of various kinds, the adjacent building (machine shop, late-19th century) which now serves as a public library, and the building known as the White House (built as the Clerk of the Cheque's residence in 1816).

== Defence of the dockyard ==
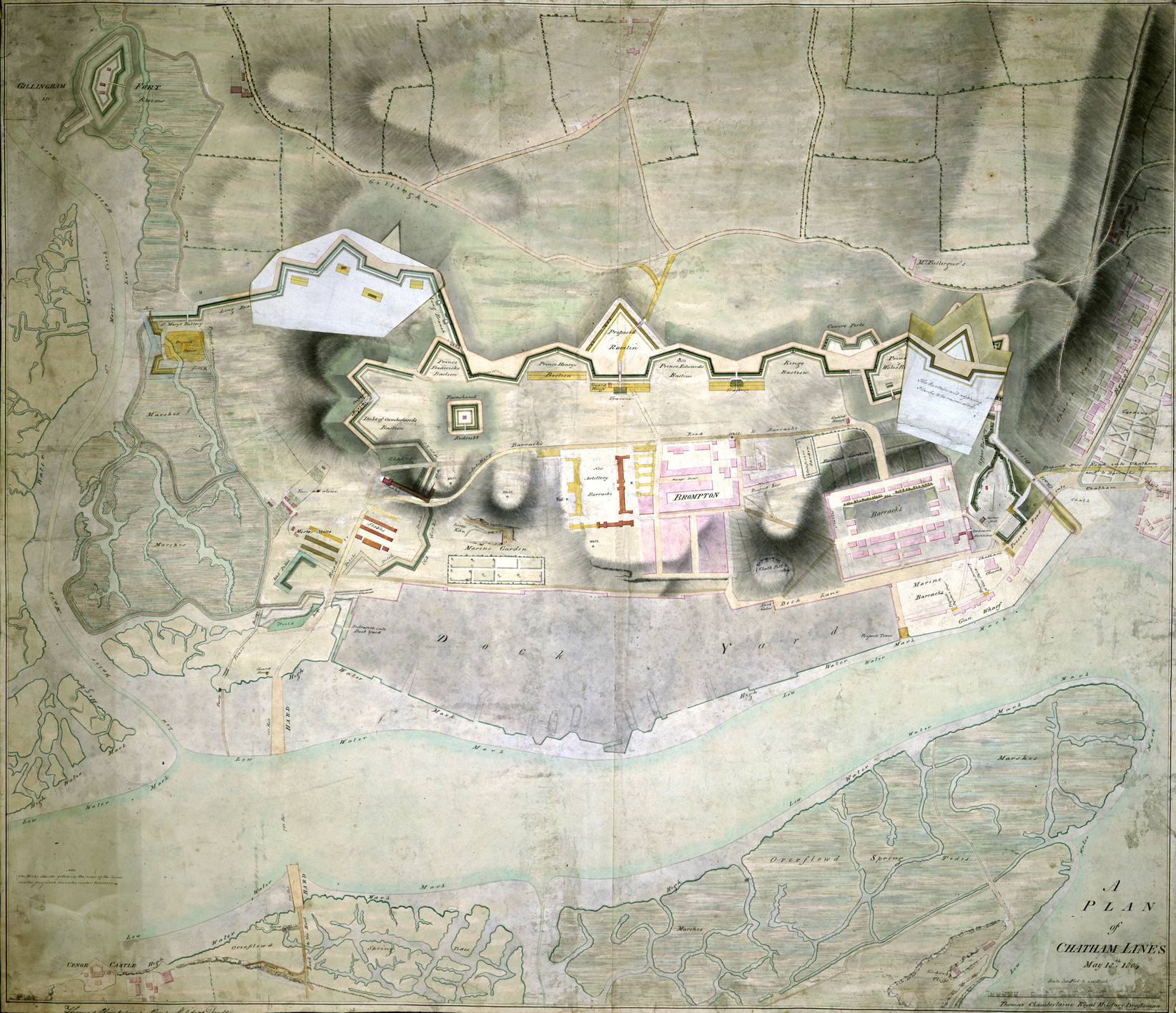
Plan of Chatham Lines, 1804: fortification protecting the dockyard (below centre); Upnor Castle is in the bottom left corner.

=== Upnor Castle ===
Dockyards have always required shore defences. Among the earliest for Chatham was Upnor Castle, built in 1567, on the opposite side of the River Medway. It was somewhat unfortunate that, on the one occasion when it was required for action—the Raid on the Medway, 1667—the Dutch fleet were able to sail right past it to attack the English fleet and carry off the pride of the fleet, HMS Royal Charles, back to the Netherlands.

=== Chain defence ===
During the wars with Spain it was usual for ships to anchor at Chatham in reserve; consequently John Hawkins threw a massive chain across the River Medway for extra defence in 1585. Hawkins' chain was later replaced with a boom of masts, iron, cordage, and the hulls of two old ships, besides a couple of ruined pinnacles.

=== The Lines ===
With the failure of Upnor Castle, it was seen necessary to increase the defences. In the event, those defences were built in distinct phases, as the government saw the increasing threat of invasion:

- 1669 Fort Gillingham and Cockham Wood Fort built.
- 1756 Chatham Lines built, to designs by Captain John Desmaretz (who also designed the Portsmouth fortifications). This fortification, and its subsequent upgrading, were to concentrate on an overland attack and so were built to face south. They included redoubts at Amherst and Townsend. The Lines enclosed the entire dockyard on its eastern side.
- 1778–1783 Further improvements were carried out, to the designs of Captain Hugh Debbeig at the bequest of General Amherst. In 1782, an Act of Parliament increased the land needed for the Field of Fire.
- 1805–1812 Amherst redoubt, now Fort Amherst; new forts, named Pitt and Clarence. The Lines were also extended to the east of Saint Mary's Creek (on St Mary's Island).
- 1860s Grain Fort, and other smaller batteries in that area.
- 1870–1892 A number of forts built at a greater distance from the dockyard: Forts Bridgewood, Luton, Borstal, Horsted and Darland. These became known as the "Great Lines". Forts Darnet and Hoo built on islands in the River Medway.
The defences in 1770.

The defences in 1812.

How the military presence developed after 1820, showing how the need for housing gave birth to New Brompton, and showing roads and railways.

== Associated barracks ==
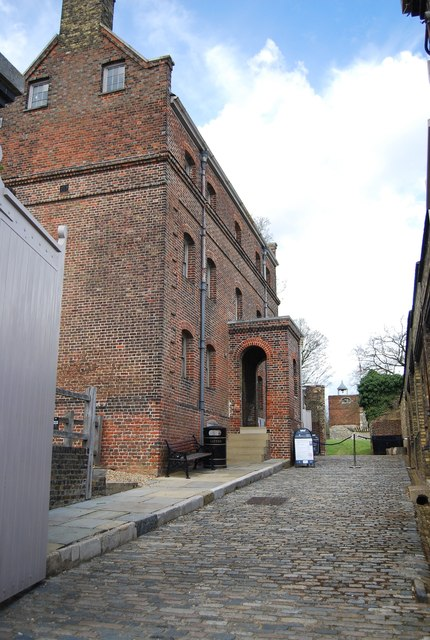
Upnor Castle barracks (1718).

The Dockyard led to large numbers of military personnel being garrisoned in Chatham and the surrounding area. A good many were engaged in manning the defences, but some had other duties; others were accommodated there for convenience prior to embarking on ships for duties overseas, or following their disembarkation. Initially, soldiers were housed under canvas or else billetted in houses and inns, but from the 18th century barracks began to be constructed. The oldest surviving barracks in the Chatham area is in Upnor; dating from 1718, it housed the detachment of 64 men responsible for guarding the gunpowder store in Upnor Castle.

=== Infantry Barracks (Kitchener Barracks) ===
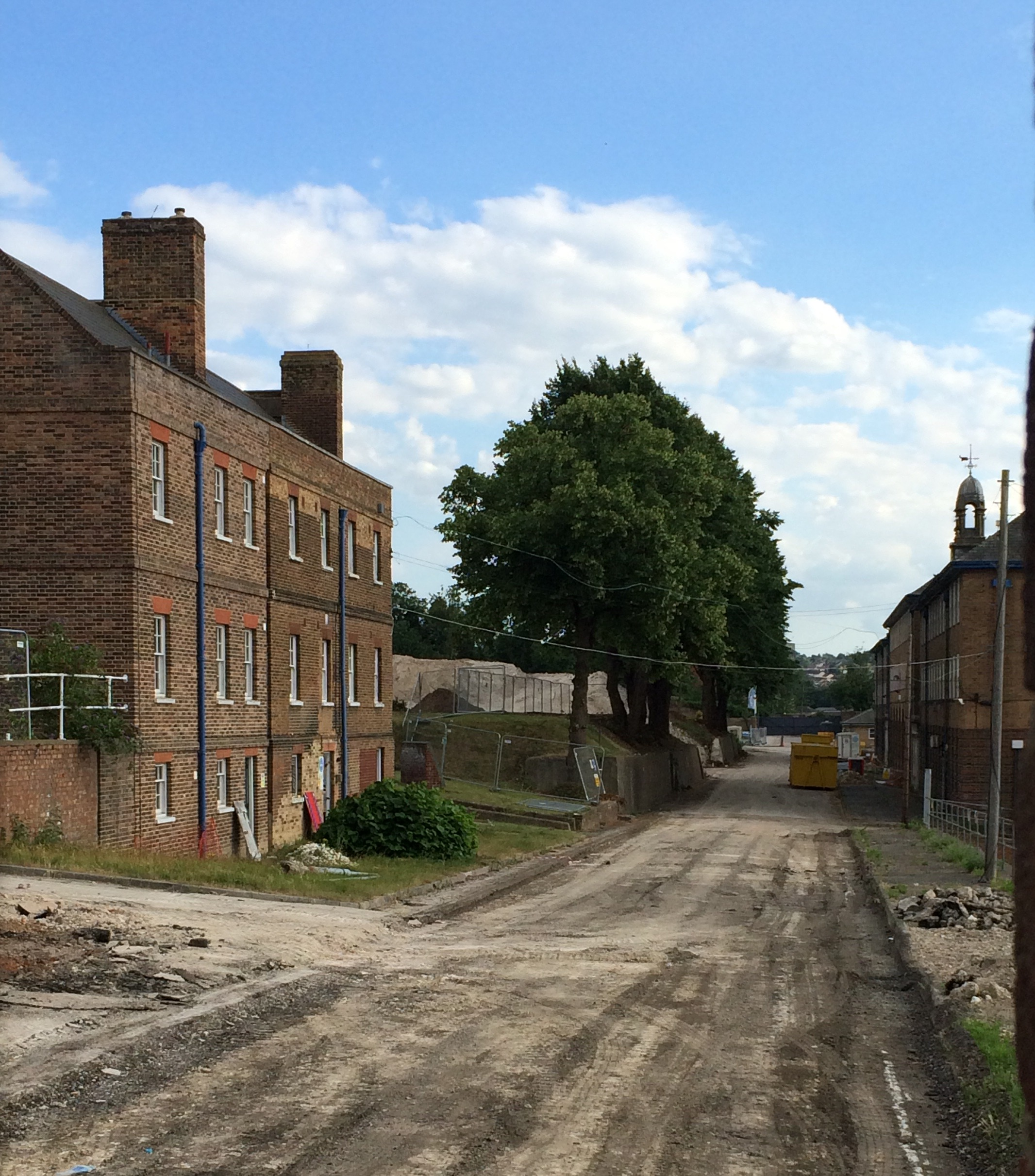
Surviving 1757 block from the original Infantry Barracks

Chatham Infantry Barracks was opened in 1757 to house troops manning the fortifications which had recently been built to defend the Dockyard. Accommodating some 1,800 men, Chatham was one of the first large-scale Army barracks in England. Built on sloping ground east of the Dockyard, the rectangular site (enclosed within its own perimeter wall) consisted of a 'Lower Barracks' with accommodation for the soldiers and 'Upper Barracks' (later known as 'The Terrace') which housed the officers; between the two was a large parade ground. The three-storey barrack blocks were aligned north–south. Externally, all the blocks were similar in appearance. Those for the officers were placed in a single row on elevated ground to the east, accessed from the parade ground by way of a double ramp; they provided housing for two field officers, twelve captains and thirty-seven subalterns. The subalterns were given one room each, the captains two, and field officers four. The officers all had servants, who were provided with their own accommodation in the garret. The barracks for other ranks were arranged in three rows, west of the parade ground, with soldiers sleeping sixteen to a room in eight double beds, as was standard practice at that time. Similar but smaller blocks to the north and south housed ancillary services, such as the pay office, infirmary and Quartermaster's stores.

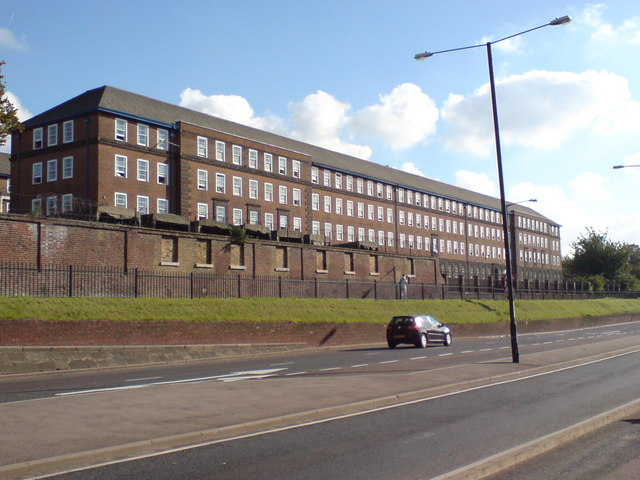
Kitchener Barracks, lower level (the 1950s extension, demolished in 2017).

Within the space of 20 years, Chatham Barracks had taken on an additional role as the Army Depôt of Recruits and Invalids: accommodating 'a mixed mass of people, viz. recruits destined for regiments which were abroad, prisoners confined on account of desertion and other military offences, added to which was a proportion of invalids, sent home from foreign stations on account of old age, or bodily infirmity'. The establishment of the Depôt was linked to the appointment in 1778 of an 'Inspector General and Superintendent of the Recruiting of all the Forces employed on foreign service', based in Chatham, who provided a degree of centralised oversight of recruitment (responsibility for which had previously been left entirely to the regiments). During this time, Chatham Depôt provided basic training for new recruits. This role ceased in 1801, however, when the entire Depôt establishment moved to Parkhurst Barracks on the Isle of Wight (where the recruits were less prone to find ways of deserting).

During the Napoleonic Wars large numbers of troops were concentrated at Chatham Lines to counter the threat of a French invasion. In the years of peace after 1815 Chatham continued to serve as a major embarkation port for troops serving overseas. The Infantry Barracks went on to serve as a home depot for numerous regiments.

A Royal Commission of 1861 (set up in the wake of the Crimean War to improve the sanitary condition of Britain's Army barracks and Hospitals) was scathing in its judgement of facilities at Chatham; in the years that followed several alterations were made to Chatham Barracks (which had changed little over the preceding century): an additional storey was added to several of the barrack blocks to help alleviate overcrowding, and new buildings were inserted among the old, containing improved facilities for cooking, washing and recreation. At around the same time the officers' blocks on the terrace were given over to provide accommodation for sergeants and married NCOs, the officers being provided with new quarters 'near the fortifications at Prince Henry's Bastion'. In 1865, following the opening of new and enlarged hospital facilities in Fort Pitt, the old Garrison Hospital was closed; its buildings (on what is now Maxwell Road) were converted into barracks and named 'Upper Chatham Barracks' (later 'Upper Kitchener Barracks'). New married quarters were also opened in March that same year, into which soldiers' families were moved, mostly from lodgings in the town.

In 1928 Chatham Barracks was taken over by the Royal Engineers and renamed Kitchener Barracks. One barrack block remains from 1757; the rest was largely demolished and rebuilt to a more modern design in the 1930s–50s. The barracks remained in military use until 2014.

In 2014 the site was sold to a property developer, with permission given the following year for the building of 295 homes. The main 1930s barracks building is being retained, along with the remaining earlier structures. The new development has retained the name Kitchener Barracks.

=== Marine Barracks ===
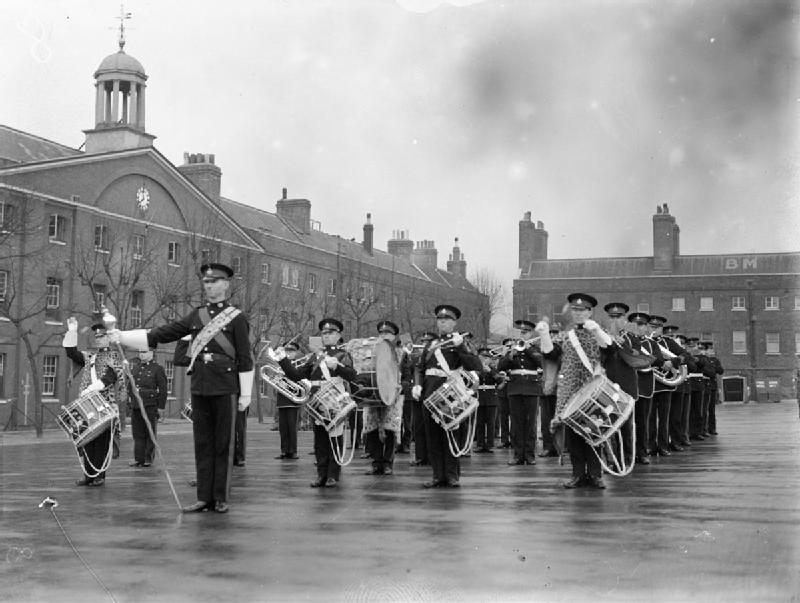
The Royal Marine Barracks in the Second World War.

The Royal Marine Barracks, Chatham were established in 1779, on a site nestled between the Gun Wharf to the west, the Dockyard to the north, and Infantry Barracks to the east. The site was expanded and rebuilt in the 1860s; in 1905 the Royal Marines took over Melville Barracks, which stood between Dock Road and Brompton Hill (it had formerly served as Chatham's Royal Naval Hospital). The Marines were withdrawn from Chatham in 1950, and the buildings were later demolished. Medway Council offices and car park now stand on the site.

=== Artillery/Engineer Barracks (Brompton Barracks) ===
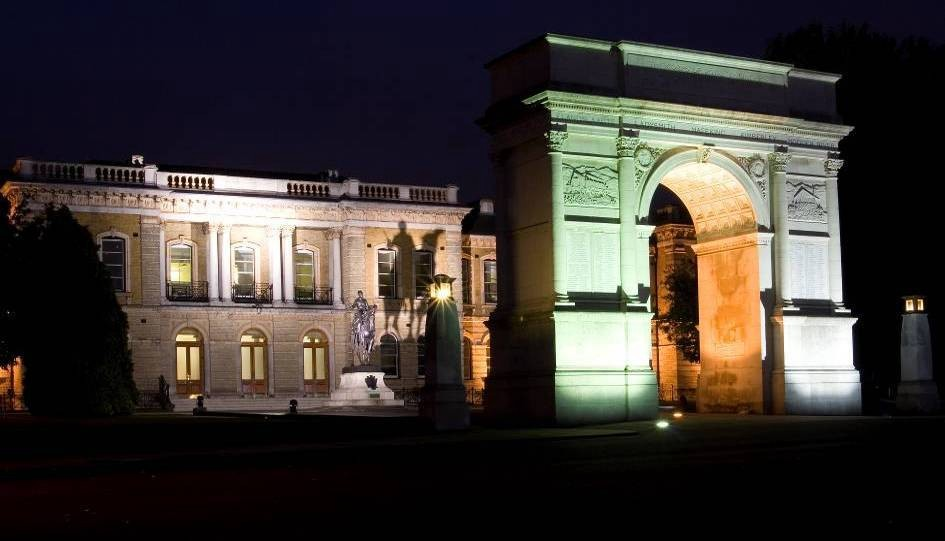
Royal School of Military Engineering (1872) and Boer War Memorial Arch (1902) at Brompton Barracks.

A barracks was built in Brompton from 1804 to 1806 for the Royal Artillery gunners serving on the defensive Lines (previously they had been accommodated in the Infantry Barracks). There was space for some 500 horses and 1,000 men. In 1812 the Royal Engineers Establishment was founded within the barracks to provide instruction in military engineering. The Establishment grew, and by 1856 the Artillery had moved out; Brompton Barracks remains in service as headquarters of the Royal Engineers.

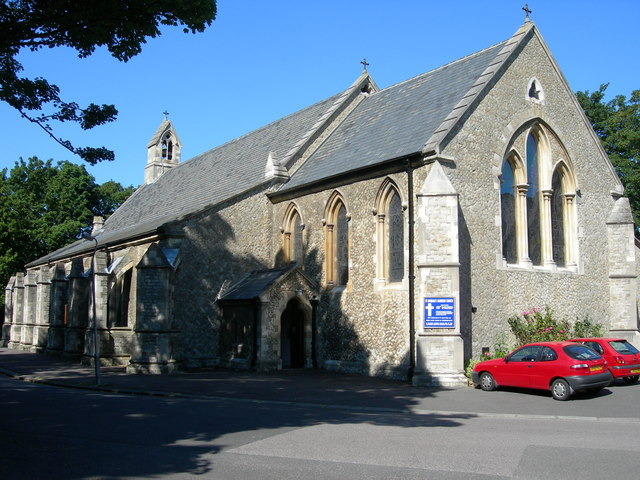
The Garrison Church of St Barbara in Maxwell Road continues to serve Brompton Barracks.

=== St Mary's Barracks ===
St Mary's Casemated Barracks were built during the Peninsular War and initially held French prisoners of war. After the war's end, they went on to serve as a gunpowder store for a time, and were used by the Royal Engineers (based nearby in Brompton Barracks). From 1844 St Mary's was used as an 'Invalid Barracks', accommodating soldiers having to return from service in different parts of the British Empire because of illness, injury or age. Built within the defensive earthworks to the north of Chatham, St Mary's Barracks was demolished in the 1960s and the land used for housing.

=== Naval Barracks (HMS Pembroke) ===
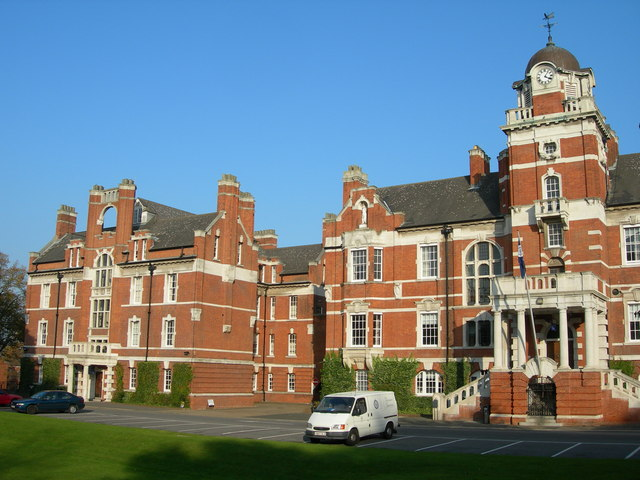
HMS Pembroke: former officers' quarters

The Naval Barracks (later HMS Pembroke) opened in 1902; prior to this, most Naval (as opposed to Dockyard) personnel were accommodated on board their ships or on hulks moored nearby. Built on the site of what had been the convict prison, the barracks complex could accommodate 4,742 officers and seamen in a series of large blocks built along the length of a terrace. Below the terrace lay the parade ground and its adjacent drill hall and other amenities. A further 3,000 troops could be accommodated in times of "total emergency" (900 were sleeping in the Drill Hall when it suffered a direct hit from two bombs in September 1917, which killed over 130 men).

The barracks were set to close in 1961 when the majority of naval personnel were withdrawn from Chatham; however, it went on to serve instead as the RN Supply and Secretariat School in succession to HMS Ceres, before finally being closed along with the Dockyard in 1984. The majority of its buildings are still standing, several of them occupied by the Universities at Medway.

== See also ==
- British narrow gauge railways
- Chatham Historic Dockyard
- Fort Darnet

== Sources ==
- The Annual Biography and Obituary for the Year. Longman, Hurst, Rees, Orme, and Brown. 1835.
- Guidebook. Chatham Historic Dockyard Trust. 2010.
- Beaston, Robert (1788). A Political Index to the Histories of Great Britain and Ireland. Vol. I. G.G.J. and J. Robinson.
- Beaston, Robert (1806). A Political Index to the Histories of Great Britain and Ireland. Vol. I. Longman, Hurst, Rees and Orme.
- Brayley, Edward Wedlake; Britton, John (1808). The Beauties of England and Wales, Or, Delineations, Topographical, Historical and Descriptive of each County. Vernor, Mood and Sharpe.
- Eastland, Jonathan; Ballantyne, Iain (2011). HMS Victory – First Rate 1765. Barnsley: Vernor, Mood and Sharpe. ISBN 978-1-84832-094-9.
- Crawshaw, James D. (1999). The history of Chatham Dockyard. Newcastle-upon-Tyne: Isabel Garford. ISBN 0-9534888-0-2. Part 1, Part 2, Part 3.
- MacDonald, Janet (2010). The British Navy's Victualling Board, 1793–1815: Management Competence and Incompetence. Boydell Press. ISBN 978-1843835530.
- Marshall, John (1983) [1824]. Royal Naval Biography; Or, Memoirs of the Services of All the Flag-officers. Longman, Hurst, Rees, Orme, Brown and Green. p. 48. ISBN 978-0665375859. "Commissioner of Chatham Dockyard."
- Perrin, William Gordon (1918). The autobiography of Phineas Pett. Naval Records Society.
- Saunders, A. D. (1985). Upnor Castle: Kent. English Heritage. ISBN 978-1-85074-039-1.
- Sephton, James (2011). Sovereign of the Seas: The Seventeenth Century Warship. Amberley Publishing. ISBN 978-1445601687.
