= List of Palmerston Forts around Chatham, Kent =

The Palmerston Forts around Chatham, Kent include:

- Fort Amherst, technically a Napoleonic era fort but later extended.
- Fort Borstal, in the village that gave its name to the youth offender's institution The Borstal.
- Fort Bridgewood
- Cliffe Fort
- Fort Darland
- Fort Darnet
- Fort Pitt, a Napoleonic era fort, but used as the Army Medical School from 1860 to 1863.
- Garrison Point Fort
- Grain Battery
- Grain Fort
- Grain Tower
- Grange Redoubt
- Fort Hoo
- Fort Horsted
- Fort Luton
- New Tavern Fort
- Shornemead Fort
- Slough Fort
- Twydall Redoubts, that includes Grange and Woodlands.
- Woodlands Redoubt
