= Twydall Profile =

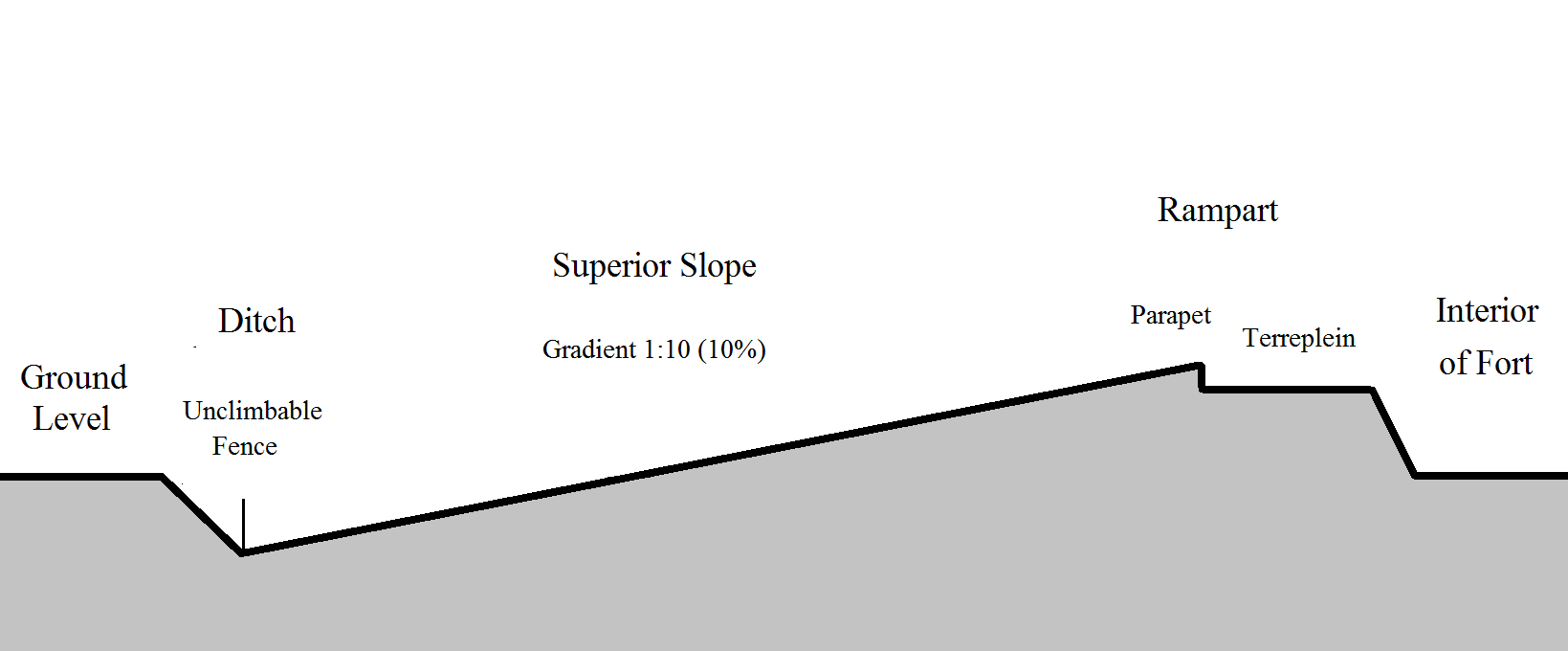
A section through the ditch and rampart of a fortification using the Twydall Profile.

The Twydall Profile was a style of fortification used in British and Imperial polygonal forts at the end of the 19th century. The sloping earthworks employed in the Twydall Profile were intended to be quick and inexpensive to construct and to be effective in the face of the more powerful artillery and high explosive ammunition being introduced at that time. The name comes from the village of Twydall in Kent, where the first forts of this type were built.

== Origins ==
The design of the Twydall Profile emerged following the Siege of Plevna during the Russo-Turkish War of 1877 to 1878. There, the hastily constructed Turkish fieldworks had successfully withstood repeated Russian assaults between July and September 1877; the Russians finally took the town after defeating an attempted Turkish breakout in December. The reason for the effectiveness of the Turkish defences was attributed to two factors; firstly, the force of the Russian shells had been absorbed by the Turkish earthworks and secondly, the defenders had been armed with American breech loading and repeating rifles and had been able to break up the attacking infantry formations before they had reached their objectives.

In the United Kingdom, a huge investment had been made in the previous decades in a considerable number of large fortifications to defend the naval dockyards, collectively known as the Palmerston Forts. Not only had many of these been designed to mount artillery which was now obsolete, but the intended defensive scheme for the dockyard at Chatham in Kent had never been completed. The solution devised and promoted by the forward-thinking military engineer, Lieutenant-Colonel Sir George Sydenham Clarke, was for a smaller, less expensive type of fort or redoubt, which could be manned by infantry and mobile field artillery rather than large guns fixed in deep emplacements. Previous forts had relied on defence against an infantry attack using a deep ditch with steep walls, often revetted with stone, brick, or concrete, known as the scarp (facing outwards) and the counterscarp (facing inwards). The fort was further protected by caponiers and counterscarp galleries; positions from which rifle or light artillery fire could be directed along the ditch. In the proposed new redoubts, all of this would be replaced by sloping earth banks, intended to maximise the effect of the defenders' rifles and minimise the effect of the attackers' artillery.

In 1885, a pair of small forts were accordingly built by way of an experiment, designed to protect the eastern overland approaches to Chatham, near the village of Twydall. Woodlands Redoubt and Grange Redoubt were collectively known as the Twydall Redoubts and were intended to prove the effectiveness of the new system and how quickly and cheaply they could be constructed. Under the direction of Sir Andrew Clarke, the Inspector-General of Fortifications, Woodlands Fort was built by a civilian contractor within a month, for the sum of £1,800. Grange Fort was built by the Royal Engineers. Sir Andrew reported that the full cost of the project was "...£6,000 as opposed to at least £45,000 for the old type [of fort]". The redoubts each had a central row of bomb-proof casemates in which the infantry garrison could shelter and was surrounded by a low earthen rampart, on which field guns could be sited and a banquette or fire step and parapet, over which the infantry could fire their rifles. The shallow ditch was crossed by a drawbridge at the rear; however, neither work had the barracks, fixed artillery emplacements, magazines, or caponiers that might have been expected in a fort of this period.

== Description ==
In the study of fortification, the term "profile" means the form of a defensive structure when viewed as a cross section in the vertical plane. The Twydall Profile consists of a simple earthen rampart, built as low as possible; between 10 and 15 feet (3.0 and 4.6 metres) and not greater than 20 feet (6.1 metres) was recommended. From the crest of the rampart continuous gentle slope, ideally of a gradient of 1 in 10, falling to 15 or 20 feet (4.6 or 6.1 metres) below the original surface of the ground. At the foot of the slope is an unclimbable palisade made of angled steel palings, often referred to as a "Dacoit fence", recommended to be 9 feet 6 inches (2.90 metres) tall. Beyond that, there is a steep earth counterscarp, the main function of which is to protect the palisade from artillery fire. Entanglements of barbed wire may be sited on the forward slope of the rampart and on the crest of the counterscarp. The frontal slope of the rampart, known as the "superior slope", was recommended ideally to be of a gradient of 1 in 10, which had been shown in tests to cause the majority of incoming shells to ricochet on impact.

== Examples ==
- Grange Redoubt: Kent, 1885
- Woodland Redoubt: Kent, 1885
- Beacon Hill Battery: Essex, 1889
- Penlee Battery: Cornwall, 1889–1892.
- Steynewood Battery: Isle of Wight, 1889–1894
- North Weald Redoubt: Essex, 1890
- Fort Farningham: Surrey, 1890
- Fort Macaulay: Victoria, British Columbia, 1894–1897
- Culver Battery: Isle of Wight, 1904–1906
