= Dummy Battery =

Disused gun battery in Kent, England

- Grain, Kent, England
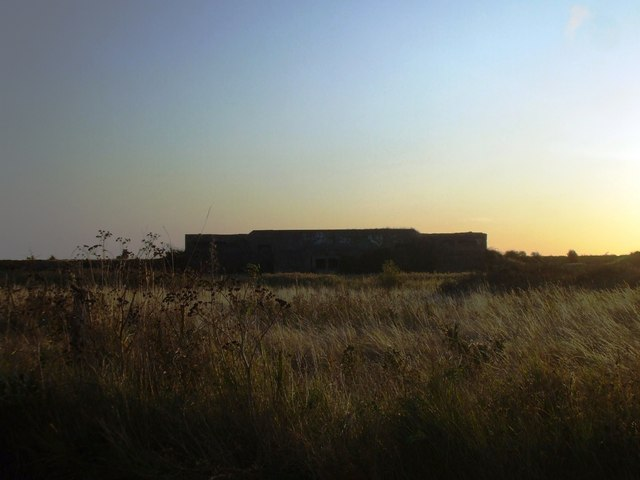
- The remains of the battery

Site information
- Type: Fortification
- Condition: Partly demolished

Location
- Coordinates: 51.448223°N 0.722319°E

Site history
- Built: 1867–69
- Built by: United Kingdom
- In use: 1895–1940s?
- Materials: Earth, concrete
- Demolished: 1950s

Dummy Battery, originally known as Grain Battery, is a disused fortified gun battery located about 1 kilometre (0.62 mi) south of the village of Grain, Kent at the confluence of the Rivers Thames and Medway. Completed in 1865, it supported two nearby coast artillery batteries at Grain Fort and Grain Wing Battery, a short distance to the north. The battery's arc of fire overlapped with Grain Tower just offshore and with Garrison Point Fort on the Isle of Sheppey across the other side of the Medway. It consisted of an earthwork with a concrete core supporting several gun emplacements with magazines below. It appears to have gone out of service as a battery by the time of the First World War, though it briefly took on a role in anti-aircraft defence. It was subsequently abandoned and was severely damaged by demolitions and the removal of its earthworks, leaving only the substantial remains of its concrete core standing today.

== Strategic context and construction ==
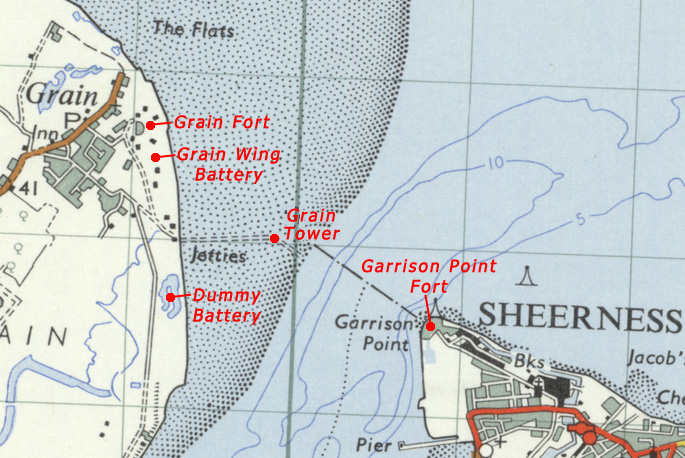
Map of the fortifications at the entrance to the Medway

The battery was constructed shortly before Grain Fort, built in 1861–68, entered active service. Both fortifications were built following the recommendations of the Royal Commission on the Defence of the United Kingdom which was established by Lord Palmerston in 1859, in response to a perceived threat from France. The site chosen for the battery was about 1 kilometre (0.62 mi) south of Grain Fort. It was linked to the fort by a military road constructed on a causeway across marshland; the battery's purpose was to cooperate with the fort by supplementing its arc of fire, which crossed with that of Garrison Point Fort on the other side of the river. The battery originally took the form of a J-shaped earthwork in which a concrete core accommodated an unknown number of embrasures for the guns and a magazine under a rectangular mound at the rear, but underwent substantial changes following its construction.

== Operational history ==
The battery was initially armed with four or five heavy rifled muzzle loaders for use against large warships. These were replaced in 1895 by more powerful 6-inch rifled breech loaders. In 1905 it was renamed from Grain Battery to Dummy Battery and underwent substantial alterations to its fabric to accommodate a new set of guns. Two 4.7-inch quick-firing guns were installed on the roof of the fort to counter smaller and faster adversaries such as torpedo boats and destroyers. They were mounted in a pair of concrete emplacements of a typical low-profile design, with ready-use ammunition recesses adjacent to each gun. The emplacements were linked by a covered way protected by a high parapet wall. A new magazine was also built within the battery's core, with separate storage rooms for shells and cartridges, and a fire control position was added. These alterations resulted in major changes to the form of the terreplein which obliterated many of its original features. A troop shelter also existed behind the main trace of the earthworks.

The battery's coastal defence role ended some time before the First World War and its guns were removed. It continued in use as an anti-aircraft defence site during the war with the installation of two 3-inch anti-aircraft guns, intended to protect Grain Air Station nearby. It appears to have been abandoned subsequently. Between 1953 and 1955 the derelict battery was severely damaged by demolitions and excavations for materials, which removed the surface buildings and the original magazine.

== Current status ==
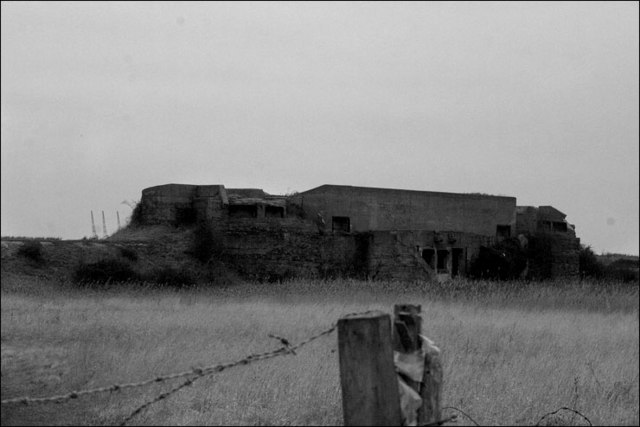
The remains of the Battery

The remains of the battery consist primarily of its heavily damaged concrete core from the 1860s, which is now fronted by a lake created during the 1950s excavations. The 1905 gun emplacements are still partly intact, though mutilated. A rectangular concrete structure to the right of the emplacements once housed the fire control director and a planning room. Another more fragmentary concrete enclosure is located further to the right. Nothing is left of the original 1860s magazines or the support buildings, though their outlines can be seen on the ground.

Dummy Battery is part of a scheduled monument designated in 1976 to cover "coastal artillery defences on the Isle of Grain, immediately east and south east of Grain village". It is located on private land and there is no formal public access.
