= Grain Wing Battery =

- Grain, Kent, England

Site information
- Type: Fortification
- Owner: St James, Isle of Grain Parish Council
- Condition: Surface buildings demolished, emplacements infilled

Location
- Coordinates: 51.454757°N 0.720774°E

Site history
- Built: 1890–95
- Built by: United Kingdom
- In use: 1895–1956
- Materials: Earth, concrete
- Demolished: 1960s

Grain Wing Battery is a former gun battery located just east of the village of Grain, Kent at the confluence of the Rivers Thames and Medway. It supported two existing and adjacent artillery batteries at Grain Fort and Dummy Battery, overlapping its arc of fire with Grain Tower just offshore and with Garrison Point Fort on the Isle of Sheppey across the other side of the Medway. The battery consisted of an earthwork with several gun emplacements. It was only in use as a battery for a few years after its completion in 1895, though its interior continued to be occupied by Army buildings. It was abandoned in 1956 and its remains were demolished and infilled a few years later. The site is now part of a coastal park owned by the local council.

== Strategic context and construction ==
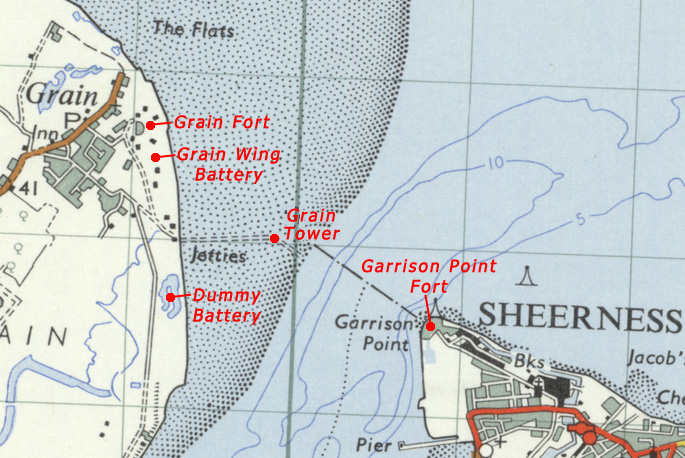
Map of the fortifications at the entrance to the Medway

A number of forts and batteries had been built in the vicinity during the preceding forty years, initially in response to a perceived threat from France and subsequently upgraded to deter German naval attacks on the military and commercial installations along the Thames and Medway. The battery was the last of the fortifications to be constructed at the mouth of the Medway and was intended to support and supplement the firepower of Grain Fort 50 metres (160 ft) to the north and Dummy Battery 1 kilometre (0.62 mi) to the south. It was situated alongside a military road that linked Grain Fort to Dummy Battery.

The battery consisted of four gun emplacements on a lozenge-shaped earthen mound with a rectangular hollow at its centre and a gently sloping glacis to the front, taking advantage of the terrain to provide maximum concealment. The emplacements were lined up along the forward rampart with magazines and detachment shelters located below. The ramparts were surrounded by a ditch within which was an unclimbable fence. Range finder positions were constructed on the ends of the ramparts

== Operational history ==
Grain Wing Battery was initially armed with two 11-inch rifled muzzle loaders for use against large warships, plus two 4.7-inch quick-firing guns intended to be used against smaller and faster adversaries such as torpedo boats and destroyers. In 1914 the battery was disarmed and the 4.7-inch guns were transferred to Grain Tower. It remained in use for infantry defence purposes through the First World War and buildings were constructed in the interior to provide temporary housing for the soldiers. A series of breastworks was also constructed by converting the parapet between the emplacements. The battery was abandoned, along with the other defences in the vicinity, when the UK's coastal defence programme was discontinued in 1956. The site was acquired by the local authority in 1961. The surface buildings were subsequently demolished and the gun emplacements were infilled by 1966.

== Current status ==
The site of the battery is now within the Isle of Grain Coastal Park, which is managed by the Friends of the Coastal Park in partnership with its owners, St James Parish Council. The battery's earthworks still survive in good condition, though now somewhat overgrown, and traces of the emplacements and range finder positions can still be seen in the form of depressions in the ground and short lengths of concrete. It is part of a scheduled monument designated in 1976 to cover "coastal artillery defences on the Isle of Grain, immediately east and south east of Grain village".
