= Fort Bridgewoods =

Former military facility in Medway, England

Coordinates: 51°21′35″N 00°29′40″E

The site of Fort Bridgewoods is on the outskirts of Rochester, Medway in the United Kingdom, next to the Rochester-Maidstone road (B2097). The site was acquired by the War Office in about 1860 to form part of a ring of forts protecting the Royal Dockyard at Chatham.

== Building ==
It was envisaged that the line would stretch from the River Medway to the Thames but a shortage of money meant only five of the original large works plus two small experimental earthen redoubts were built. Work, using convict labour, started 30 years later in 1890, but by that time the enemy it was supposed to repulse, France, was an ally, the new enemy was Imperial Germany.

Because of budget restraints and changing fashions in fortifications, no fixed armament was mounted; instead earthen ramps were built to enable field artillery to fire from the fort's parapet. The fort was a radical departure from traditional design, of earth construction, with a deep dry moat designed to blend in with the line of the land. There were magazines and living quarters under the earthen walls. A new large prison was built on the hill above the nearby village of Borstal to house the workforce. It later became a prison for young offenders and gave its name to the Borstal Institution system of correction.

=== Railway ===
Four of the forts (Luton, Horsted, Bridgewoods and Borstal) were linked by an 18 in (457 mm) gauge railway to move building materials between the sites, called the Eastern Defences Railway (EDR), built by the Royal Engineers. Building materials were brought by barge up the River Medway to a quay at Borstal, then hauled up the steep scarp slope of the North Downs to the fort via a branch of the EDR. This was done using a special type of locomotive called a Handyside locomotive that could be clamped to the tracks while it hauled wagons up behind it in stages using a winch mounted on the front of the loco. The prisoners were transported along the EDR in lockable carriages, accompanied by armed warders. The railway remained in use until about 1905.

Some of the original railway lines can be seen in the cow-shed floor of the prison farm, which in a previous incarnation was the railway workshop. The line of a section of the track between Fort Bridgewood and Fort Horsted can be seen from the air (for example on Google Earth), as it curves away in a south westerly direction from the junction of City Way and Marconi Way.

== World wars ==
After completion and until the outbreak of the First World War, Fort Bridgewoods was only sporadically garrisoned. In the early years of the 20th century the Royal Engineers deliberately mined and blew up one corner of the fort during a field exercise. With repairs undertaken the fort slipped into obscurity until trials with gun laying radar were undertaken at the Fort in the late 1930s. With radar installed, Bridgewoods served as headquarters for anti-aircraft guns in the Thames Estuary with the two flanking forts of Horsted and Borstal being among the most up-to-date anti-aircraft batteries in Britain.

== Nuclear age ==
With the development of the nuclear bomb, new protected headquarters were built at Bridgewoods in the early 1950s. Shortly after completion Anti Aircraft Command was disbanded and the site used for Civil Defence preparation and training. In 1960 the protected headquarters became the regional HQ for London (south) and remained in use until the early 1970s.

In 1975 the site was sold to a property developer who quickly demolished the fort and bunker. The site remained empty for a number of years and is now a Royal Mail depot. Part of the fort is also under UK Vending Ltd, whose address is Fort Bridgewood.
