= Fort Borstal =

- Borstal, Kent, England
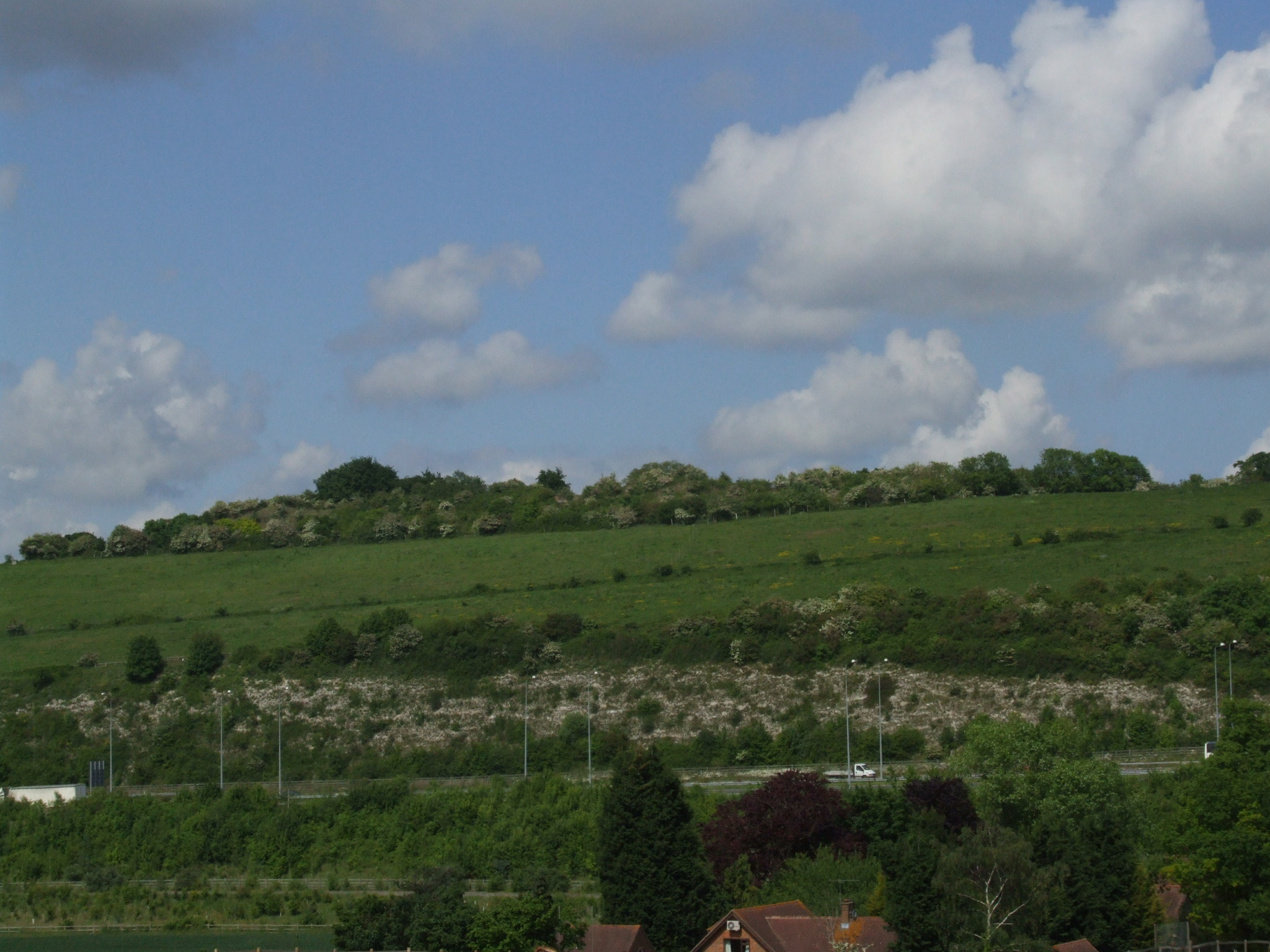

Site information
- Type: Palmerston fort
- Owner: Private

Location
- Coordinates: 51°22′14″N 00°29′21″E

Site history
- Built: 1885
- Built by: Captain Siborne, R.E.
- Materials: Brick and earthworks
- Battles/wars: World War II
- Events

Scheduled monument
- Official name: Fort Borstal
- Reference no.: 1003402

Fort Borstal was built as an afterthought from the 1859 Royal Commission on the Defence of the United Kingdom, by convict labour. Construction started in 1875 but was suspended in 1885. The fort was completed around 1895. it was one of a series of four forts that ringed Chatham.

Fort Borstal was designed to hold the high ground southwest of Rochester, South East England. It is of polygonal design and was not originally armed. An anti-aircraft battery was based there in the Second World War.

A 18 in (457 mm) gauge railway was built connecting the four Chatham ring forts of Borstal, Bridgewoods, Horsted and Luton. A rope-worked incline led west from Fort Borstal down to a gravel pit and wharf on the River Medway. About 600 yards (550 m) of track remains intact at Fort Borstal.

After many years' use as a pig farm and store for the nearby Young Offenders Institution it was sold in 1991 to a company hoping to make it a museum, but that proved unsuccessful and the fort has been converted into living accommodation. There is no public access to the site.
