= Riverside Country Park =

Park in Kent, England

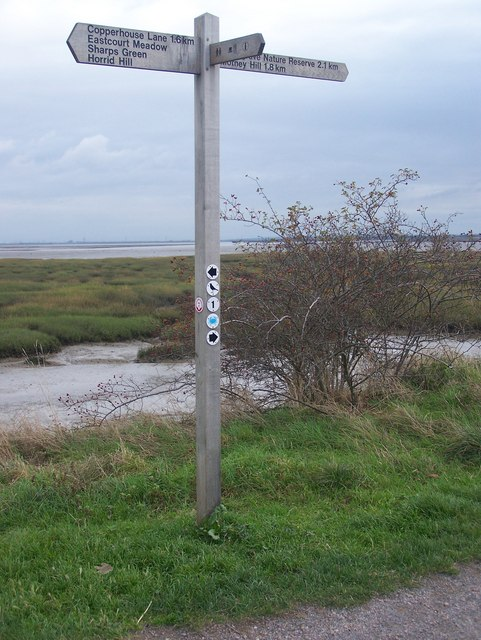
- Footpath Junction in Riverside Country Park

- Location within Kent
- OS grid: TQ808683
- Coordinates: 51°23′07″N 0°35′49″E
- Area: 247 acres (1.00 km^{2})
- Created: 1970s
- Operator: Medway Council
- Status: Open 7 days a week, dawn until dusk
- Website: Riverside Country Park

Riverside Country Park is a large coastal public park, situated alongside the River Medway estuary between Gillingham and Rainham. The park covers about 100 hectares (250 acres). There are a variety of natural habitats within the park, including mudflats and salt marsh, ponds and reed-beds, grassland and scrub, which provide a haven for wildlife.

== History ==
The coastline of Gillingham has had a rich and varied past. The park was established in the 1970s by Medway Council and takes in the various areas; of Motney Hill, Rainham Dock, Bloors Wharf, Horrid Hill, Sharp's Green Bay and Eastcourt Meadows.

=== Rainham Docks and Motney Hill ===
The earliest known occupation of the area was in the Neolithic times according to archaeological evidence found around the Rainham Docks area. This was later used by the Romans as a burial site.

Like most of Medway, the fertile area was then a major site of hops, cherries, plums and apple orchards and wheat fields.

In 1819, Motney Hill appears on maps as an island, because of its large sand deposits it was also known as 'Gritty Island'. The chalk came from a large pit, now known as Berengrave Local Nature Reserve

A cement works was then established on Motney Hill island in 1912. During high tides, barges sailed into the river near the docks, then workers known as 'Muddies' collected mud from the riverbed and loaded it onto the barges. As the tide came back in, the barges would re-float and sail to Rainham Dock, where the mud would be mixed with chalk and fired at high temperatures to produce cement.

Barges then sailed from Rainham Dock East loaded with cement and flints. These were used in the construction of roads and buildings. The barges would return with coal (for firing the cement work kilns ) and timber for the local industry and making staves (timber slats used for making barrels). The barrels were then used to transport the cement.

The cement factory closed in the 1940s, and soon after the buildings were dismantled. The dockside still remains. The chalk pit also closed in 1931 after the cement factory.

Motney Hill has also been known as Motley Hill on some old maps.

In 1923, a pumping station and sewerage installations were built on Motney Hill. It began processing waste from Rochester and Chatham, and then later Gillingham. Over the years, the works have been modernised and now it handles over 10 million gallons of effluent each day.

=== Bloors Wharf ===
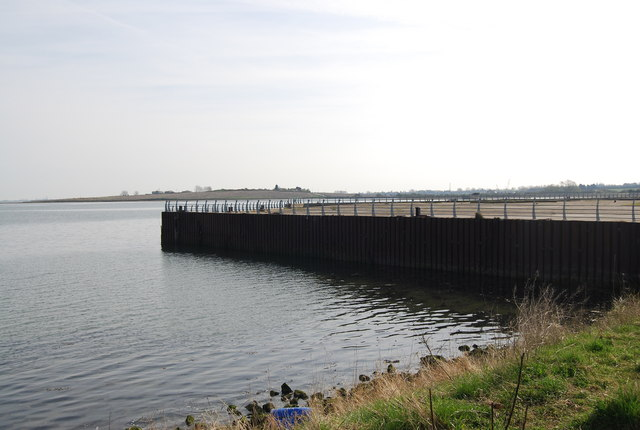
Bloors Wharf, Motney Hill is in the background

From 1869, maps began to show a small quay. It started as a fisherman's wharf, then had warehouses and was finally a scrap yard and ship breaker's site,

The buildings on the wharf have been cleared and it is now an empty abandoned space with a concrete seawall and steel fence.

=== Horrid Hill ===
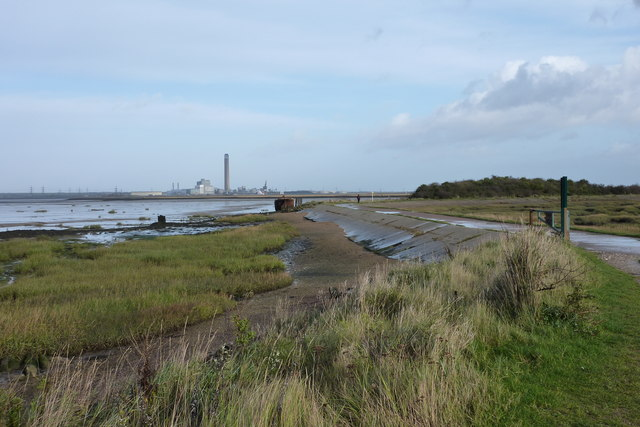
Causeway to Horrid Hill

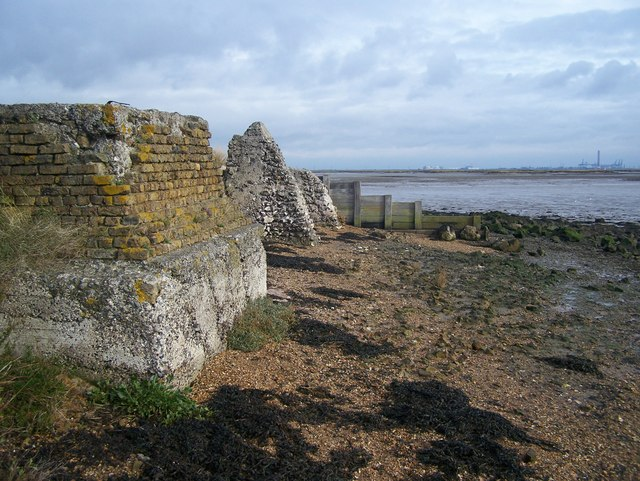
The ruins of the cement works at Horrid Hill

In the 1860s, Alfred Castle used to moor his vessels in Sharp's Green Bay (see more later), to collect chalk from a nearby quarry in Twydall, before heading across the water to his two cement works on Queenborough on the Isle of Sheppey. The chalk was carted to the barges from the quarry, then the barges would be loaded at low tide, as the draught (draft (hull)) of the vessel would require more water under the keel to float off the mud. Due to tidal constraints, the barges were loaded by hand. Castle later built a wooden jetty further down the channel leading to a small peninsula in the river. This then allowed the barges to load at high and low tides. Later, to improve the speed of loading, he built a narrow gauge horse-drawn railway from the quarry to the new wooden jetty. Trucks on the railway had side-tippers, so could just tip their loads into the barges. The chalk was then transported to Queenborough via seven barges, owned by Alfred and his brother James. The works produced 400 tons of cement a week.

In 1890, Joseph Wilders and Franic Joseph Carey were searching for a coastal site of their own cement works. An agreement was made with Alfred Castle to use the eastern side of the peninsula. The new works required some land reclamation, by constructing an extension to the existing causeway and extending the railway out to the works on the island. It was one of the smallest cement works on record. A wharf of timber and concrete was also built to enable barges to unload coke and clay. When the works were fully operational, Carey and Wilders employed a minimum of men who were on a shift system. It was a very bleak place to work, especially during the winter months. It gained the nickname Horrid Hill

The cement works closed in 1910, but chalk was still quarried and supplied the cement works in Queenborough for many years. The last vessel to berth there was a barge, the "Dick Turpin", which subsequently ran aground in the estuary off Horrid Hill in 1913. Some of its cargo of Dundee marmalade jars can still be recovered in the River Medway.

=== Sharp's Green Bay ===
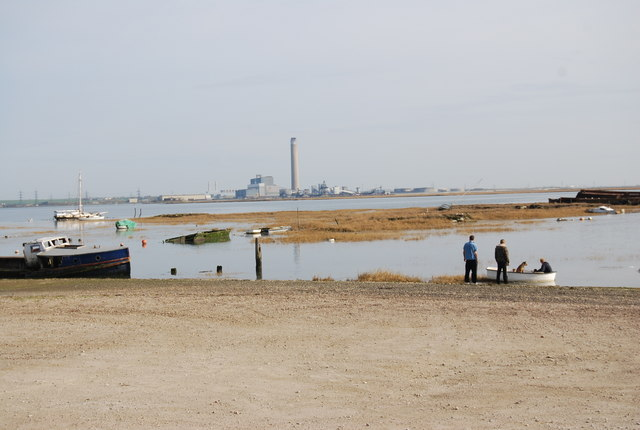
Looking across Sharp's Green Bay to Kingsnorth Power Station

Closer to the visitor centre is Sharp's Green Pond, a small freshwater pond inside the clay sea wall, which is used to promote a diversity of wildlife within the park. Sharp's Green Bay (left of Horrid Hill causeway) is a small tidal marsh bay where a few houseboats are moored. A small car park is on the bay, from a narrow access road from Lower Rainham Road.

Copperhouse Marshes are salt marshes, so named after the copperas works in nearby Gillingham. Copperas (or Iron(II) sulfate) was used as a dye for woollen cloth and for tanning, made by steeping iron pyrites in wooden vats for about six years and then boiling off the liquid. After evaporation the crystals of the dye were formed. There were Copperas factories in Queenborough in the 16th century and at Whitstable.

=== Eastcourt Meadows and country park creation ===
In 1928, Rainham became part of Gillingham Borough. This former farmland was then used by the council to tip rubbish. This was stopped in the 1950s and is now left as a wild meadow land. In 1987, the expanded Riverside Country Park officially opened, (after the initial opening in the 1970s) followed by designation of the land north of the B2004 as a country park under the Countryside Act 1968.

In 1997, Medway Council began purchasing areas of land for inclusion in Riverside Country Park, including Eastcourt Wood, Marsh Field, Mariner's Field, Bloors Wharf, Bloors Field, and Motney Field. Work was then started to remove buildings, scrap and pollution from Bloors Wharf for the new park.

== Facilities ==
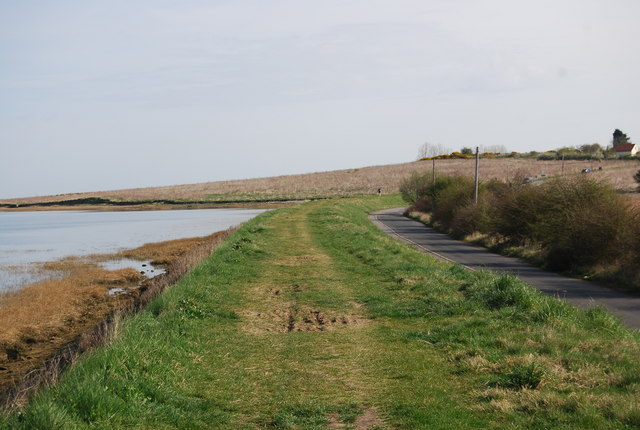
Saxon Shore Way heading towards Motney Hill

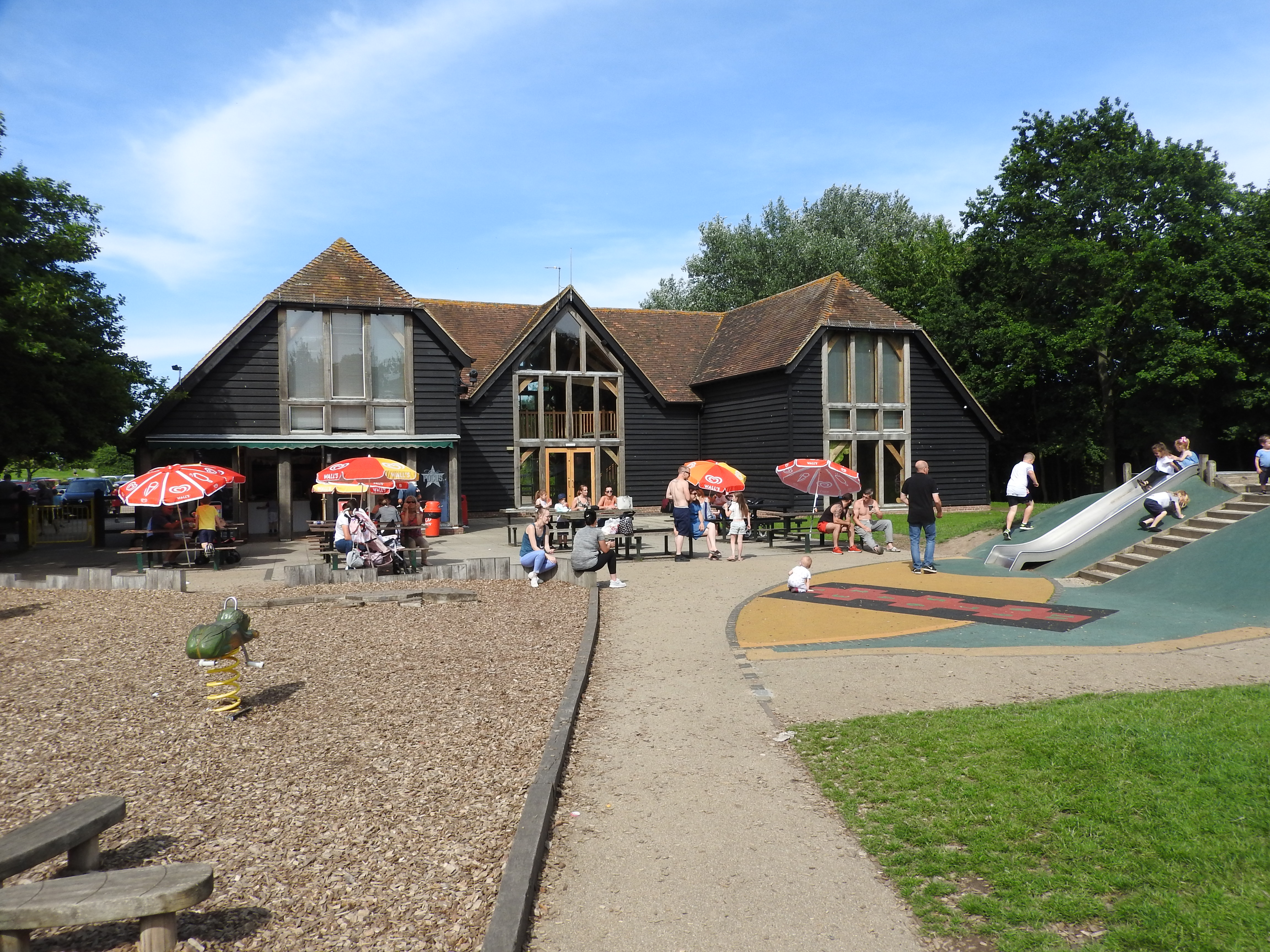
Riverside Country Park visitor centre and playground

This park is maintained by Medway Council. It has car parks and a visitor centre with a cafe, toilets and information point. The park has accessible viewpoints over the North Kent Marshes beside the River Medway.

The Saxon Shore Way (long-distance path) leads along the coast through the park, between Upchurch and Gillingham. National Cycle Route 1 follows the Saxon Shore Way through the park.

The park is accredited with a Green Flag Award by Natural England.

Motney Hill is now an RSPB reserve on a headland sticking out into the River Medway.

Berengrave Local Nature Reserve covers an area of approximately 15 hectares (37 acres). Most of it covers the former site of the Cement Works of Rainham Docks. The estuary has special protection as part of the Medway Marshes Site of Special Scientific Interest (SSSI), as defined by English Nature. and is internationally important for wintering birds that thrive on the invertebrate-rich mudflats, including many species of waders, ducks and geese. The salt marshes have a specialised ecology and act as high tide roost sites.
