= George Clarke, 1st Baron Sydenham of Combe =

British Army officer and colonial administrator

The Right Honourable The Lord Sydenham of Combe GCSI GCMG GCIE GBE
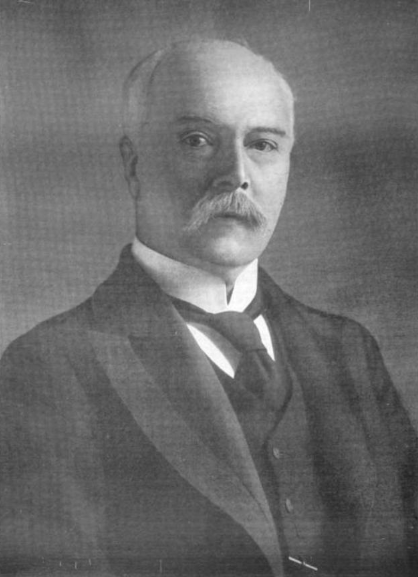

16th Governor of Bombay
- In office 18 October 1907 – 5 April 1913
- Monarchs: Edward VII (1907–10); George V (1910–13)
- Preceded by: Lord Lamington
- Succeeded by: Lord Willingdon

10th Governor of Victoria
- In office 10 December 1901 – 24 November 1903
- Premier: Sir Alexander Peacock (1901–02); William Irvine (1902–03)
- Preceded by: The Lord Brassey
- Succeeded by: Sir Reginald Talbot

Personal details
- Born: 4 July 1848 Swinderby, Lincolnshire, England
- Died: 7 February 1933 (aged 84) Onslow Square, London, England

Military service
- Allegiance: United Kingdom
- Branch/service: British Army
- Years of service: 1868–1901
- Rank: Colonel
- Battles/wars: Egyptian Expedition; Mahdist War
- Awards: Knight Commander of the Order of St Michael and St George

George Sydenham Clarke, 1st Baron Sydenham of Combe (4 July 1848 – 7 February 1933) was a British Army officer and colonial administrator.

== Biography ==
=== Background and education ===
Clarke was born in Swinderby, Lincolnshire, son of the Rev. Walter John Clarke and his wife Maria Frances Mayor. He was educated at Haileybury, Wimbledon and the Royal Military Academy, Woolwich.

=== Military career ===
Clarke entered the Royal Engineers in 1868, served in the Egyptian Expedition and as Assistant Political officer during the following Sudan expedition.

From 1885 until 1892 Clarke was secretary to the Colonial Defence Committee, for which he was knighted as a Knight Commander of the Order of St Michael and St George (KCMG) in 1893. He was also secretary to the Royal Commission on Navy and Army Administration in 1888, a commission which did much to improve cooperation between the two services. In the late 1890s he was Superintendent of the Royal Carriage Department at Woolwich.

=== Fiction ===
In 1891 his book The Last Great Naval War. An historical retrospect. By A. Nelson Seaforth. Sixth thousand was published. The book was a fictional account of a war between Britain and France, set in 1930.

=== Views on fortification ===
In 1892 Clarke published Fortification: Its Past Achievement, Recent Development and Future Progress. The book was influential in shaping the British view of military fortification. Clarke adhered to the 'Blue Water' school of thought which saw the Royal Navy as Britain's primary defence against invasion. Large scale permanent fortifications built in peacetime (such as the Palmerston Forts) were seen as a waste of money. Instead Clarke advocated the use of small field fortifications which could be built cheaply and rapidly, such as those based on the Twydall Profile.

His view was based in part on the successful defence of Plevna in 1877 by Turkish forces using magazine-fed rifles and earthwork fortifications. Also, in 1882 following the heavy bombardment of the forts at Alexandria by the British Mediterranean Fleet, Clarke, as an engineer officer, had been given the task of assessing the damage to the forts. He found the bombardment had had very little effect on the earthwork defences with only 20 of the 300 guns having been dismounted.

Returning from the Mediterranean, Clarke was appointed to a group of officers tasked with the planning of British coast defences overseas. Sydenham-Clarke's opinions on the strength of field fortifications were largely vindicated by the trench warfare of the First World War (1914–1918).

=== Colonial administrator ===
Clarke retired from the army in October 1901, when he had been appointed Governor of Victoria the previous month. He arrived in Melbourne and took the oath of office on 11 December 1901, and served in Australia until 1903. He served in India as Governor of Bombay between 1907 and 1913. A statue of him stands at the entrance to the Institute of Science College, located next to the Oval Maidan (Oval Park), South Bombay. Then Government College of Commerce, Bombay was named after him as Sydenham College of Commerce and Economics, in acknowledgement of his munificence. In 1913 he was elevated to the peerage as Baron Sydenham of Combe, of Dulverton in the County of Devon, named after one of the ancient seats of the ancient de Sydenham family which originated at the manor of Sydenham, near Bridgwater in Somerset. After his last term as governor he was a member of the committee that issued the Esher Report. The biographer of the committee's chairman describes Clarke as "...an insensitive, clumsy, uncouth and infinitely boring man..". Clarke was also the first Secretary of the Committee of Imperial Defence.

=== Critic of Churchill ===
Sydenham (4 October 1916) and Admiral Reginald Custance (9 October 1916) complained in letters to The Times that Winston Churchill’s recent statements (Churchill was out of office at the time) that the German High Seas Fleet was effectively blockaded and that surplus forces should be used in offensive operations (similar to the views of naval theorist Julian Corbett) ignored the importance of seeking a decisive victory over the German Fleet. Admiral Doveton Sturdee also complained in a private memorandum (24 Nov 1916) that Churchill’s policy was “the exact reverse of what he advocated when in office and expressed in public speeches”. Historian Christopher Bell thinks this not quite fair – Churchill had advocated risking old, near-obsolete ships in the attack on the Dardanelles but had never suggested weakening Britain’s superiority over Germany in the North Sea. In articles (The London Magazine December 1916 and January 1917) and in a Commons speech (21 February 1917) Churchill continued to argue that seeking a major naval victory over Germany was unrealistic but that Germany was effectively blockaded even if such a blockade now took place from bases further away from the enemy than in Napoleonic times.

Lord Sydenham was one of several military writers who criticized some of the opinions and statistics in Volume III of Churchill's The World Crisis. The essays "quarreling with some of his statistics and minor points of strategy and tactics" were published in magazines and then reprinted in a book in 1927. The book introduction said that the criticisms "go far to destroy any claims Volume III of The World Crisis may have to historical value".

=== Fascism and antisemitism ===
Originally a Liberal, Clarke became increasingly radical in his later life; by the 1930s he was a prominent supporter of fascist and antisemitic causes.

Clarke wrote antisemitic, racist and pro-fascist pieces, including a pamphlet of antisemitic canards called "The Jewish World Problem." He kept up an active correspondence with Adrian Arcand, the self-described "Canadian Führer"; Clarke quietly sent Arcand funds for translating the tract into French. Clarke's writings were published by The Britons, an antisemitic British Fascist organisation founded in 1919 by Henry Hamilton Beamish. According to historian Sharman Kadish, The Britons was "the most extreme group disseminating anti-Semitic propaganda in the early 1920s - indeed the first organisation set up in Britain for this express purpose."

== Personal life ==
On 1 June 1871, Clarke married Caroline Emily, eldest daughter of General Peregrine Henry Fellowes, RM. She died in 1908. Their only child, Constance Violet Clarke, was born 26 May 1879 and died 21 March 1909. He married, secondly, in 1910, to Phyllis Angelina Reynolds, a widow, daughter of George Morant of Shirley House, Carrickmacross.

Lord Sydenham of Combe died at his home in Onslow Square, London, in February 1933, aged 84, when the barony became extinct. He was cremated at Golders Green Crematorium.

== Book ==
- Bell, Christopher (2012). Churchill and Sea Power. Oxford: Oxford University Press. ISBN 978-0-19969-357-3.

Government offices
Preceded by The Lord Brassey	Governor of Victoria; 1901–1903	Succeeded by Sir Reginald Talbot
Preceded by The Lord Lamington	Governor of Bombay; 1907–1913	Succeeded by The Lord Willingdon
Peerage of the United Kingdom
New creation	Baron Sydenham of Combe; 1913–1933	Extinct
