= Fort Horsted =

Coordinates: 51.358°N 00.513°E

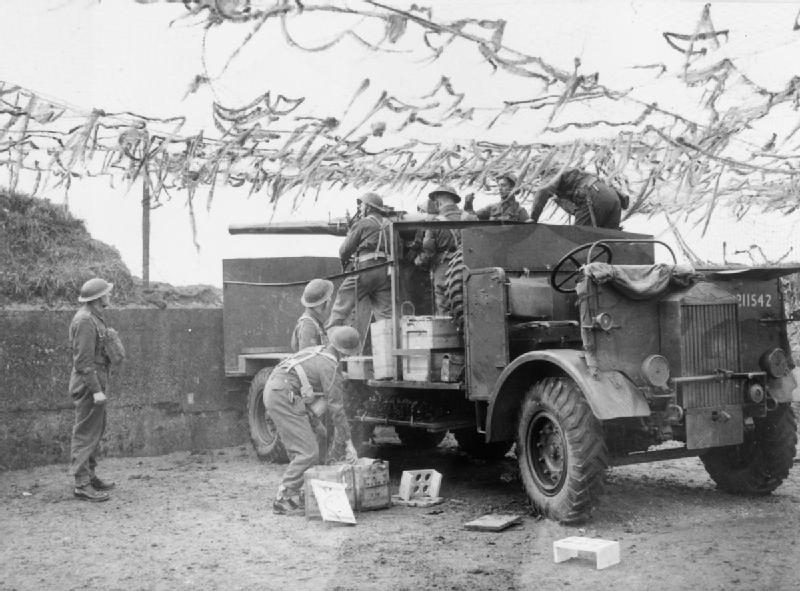
A QF 12-pounder 12 cwt AA gun mounted on Albion BY-series truck, December 1940

Fort Horsted is a scheduled monument (Monument Number 416040) that lies in the Horsted Valley to the South of Chatham, Kent, England. It is a late 19th-century Land Fort, and one of six constructed around Chatham and Gillingham, Kent to protect HM Dockyard Chatham from attack. Originally proposed in the Royal Commission on the Defence of the United Kingdom Report, published in 1860, it and the other land defences were omitted as part of general cost cutting with only the coastal defences on the River Medway being retained and completed under the original 1860 proposals. It was not until the mid-1870s that a revised programme was accepted, which included the construction of a convict prison at Borstal, Rochester, to provide low cost labour for the construction of a line of four forts, Fort Borstal, Fort Bridgewood, Fort Horsted and Fort Luton (a further three forts were constructed with the use of convict labour). Its construction started in 1879 and was complete by 1889 after much delay.

== Materials ==
The fort was constructed almost entirely of concrete, topped with chalk and earth with no visible concrete exposed from the outside, except from the gorge or rear of the fort. The ditch was protected by two single and one double counterscarp galleries.

== Armaments ==
Although the original plans of the fort proposed fixed armament, by its completion there had been a shift away from fixed armament to moveable guns. The fort would not been armed, unless actual threat materialised and then with moveable field artillery. In the event of actual invasion and an attack on HM Dockyard Chatham, additional field defence would have augmented the forts, with trenches and battery positions. In fact in 1907 during summer manoeuvres such defences were probably constructed.

== World wars ==
Deemed to have become obsolete by 1910, the fort formed part of Chatham's land defences in both World Wars. In World War I brick emplacements and a pillbox were built on the ramparts, and fixed anti-aircraft guns of an early type were installed (possibly 12-pdr coastal defence guns on improvised high-angle mountings, not be confused with the later naval version).

== The name ==
The fort was named after a local hamlet. Horsted is speculated to have been named after the legendary Saxon warrior Horsa, who was killed at nearby Aylesford while fighting the Britons.

== The fort today ==
The fort survives relatively intact and is currently in use as a business park. While it is in relatively good condition, its commercial use has seen some new construction and modification which has seen the significant loss of the original structure and features.
