= Grain Fort =

Former artillery fort in Kent, England

- Grain, Kent, England

Site information
- Type: Fortification
- Owner: St James, Isle of Grain Parish Council
- Condition: Demolished above ground

Location
- Coordinates: 51.4572°N 0.7197°E

Site history
- Built: 1861–68
- Built by: United Kingdom
- In use: 1868–1956
- Materials: Concrete, granite, brick
- Demolished: 1960s

Grain Fort is a former artillery fort located just east of the village of Grain, Kent. It was constructed in the 1860s to defend the confluence of the Rivers Medway and Thames during a period of tension with France. The fort's location enabled its guns to support the nearby Grain Tower and Garrison Point Fort at Sheerness on the other side of the Medway. It was repeatedly altered and its guns upgraded at various points in its history, before being decommissioned in 1956 when the UK abolished its coastal defence programme. It was subsequently demolished. The remnants of the fort are still visible and have been incorporated into a coastal park.

== Strategic context ==
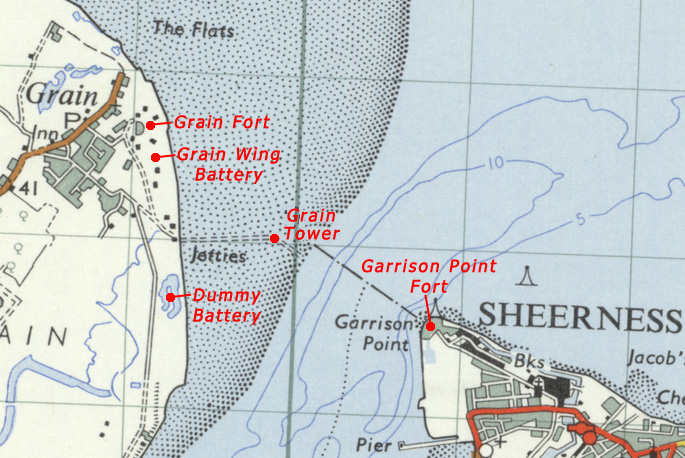
Map of the fortifications at the entrance to the Medway

The fort was constructed in response to a naval arms race between Britain and France. Britain's coastal defences had not been substantially upgraded since the Napoleonic Wars, but a new generation of accurate and powerful guns, mounted on fast-moving, manoeuvrable iron-clad warships, had obsoleted the existing 18th and early 19th century forts along the British coastline. The Thames was seen as particularly vulnerable; as well as being one of the country's most important trade routes, it possessed several naval installations of great importance, including the victualling yards at Deptford, the armaments works of Woolwich Arsenal, the shipbuilding yards at North Woolwich, and the magazines at Purfleet.

The government's response to the increased threat was to appoint a Royal Commission on the Defence of the United Kingdom, which published a far-reaching report in 1860. It recommended that many existing forts should be upgraded or rebuilt entirely, and that new forts should be constructed to guard particularly strategic or vulnerable points along the coast. In all, around 70 forts and batteries were constructed around the English coast as a result of the Royal Commission's report.

An existing gun battery, Grain Tower, already existed just off the shoreline at Grain, about 1 kilometre (0.62 mi) away from the site of the later Grain Fort. It had been built in the style of a Martello tower between 1848 and 1855 but the introduction of powerful and accurate rifled muzzle loader (RML) guns during the 1850s made it obsolete as soon as it was completed. The 1860 Commission report recommended that Grain Tower should be turned into a fully casemated fort, which would be built around the existing structure. However, the cost of doing this was seen as excessive and the proposal was dropped as part of a cost-cutting exercise to reduce the overall cost of the fort-building programme. Instead, a new land fort was built at Grain, while the existing battery at Garrison Point on the Isle of Sheppey was upgraded and fortified to create Garrison Point Fort.

== Construction and layout ==
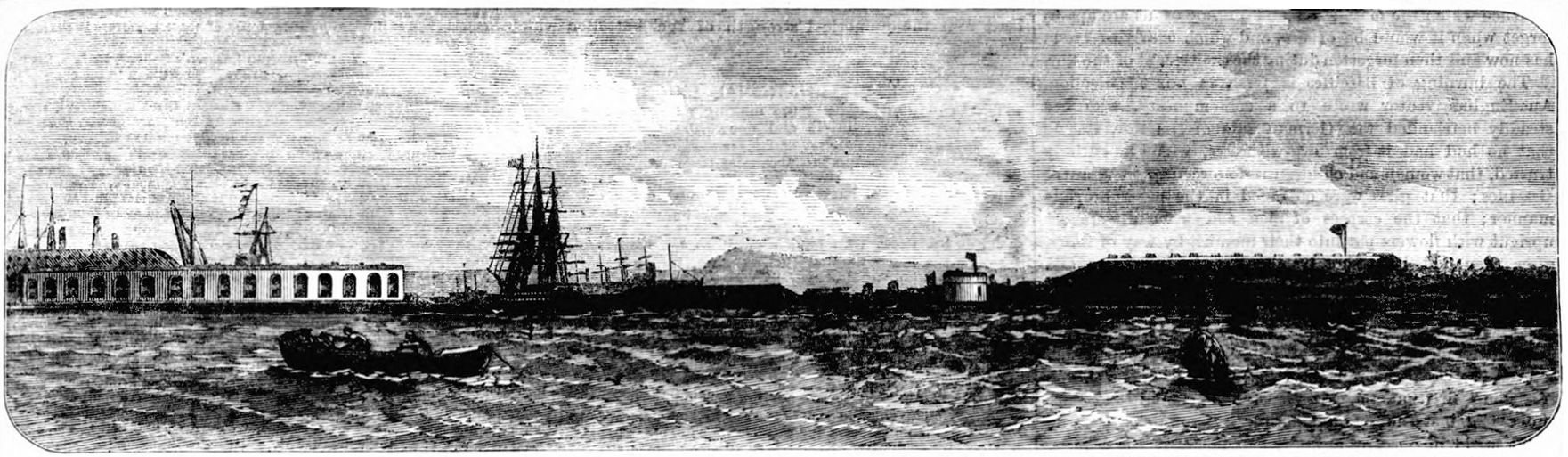
1870 view of the forts at the mouth of the Medway: (left to right) Garrison Point, Grain Tower, Grain Fort

Grain Fort was constructed between 1861–68 to a heptagonal design. It initially had thirteen open emplacements carried on an earthwork, under which lay the magazines and linking passages. A semi-circular brick keep on a north–south alignment stood at the centre of the fort. It provided barrack accommodation for the garrison and was designed to be defensible, with loopholes in its front face to facilitate musket fire. Similarly, its gorge at the rear, where the main entrance stood, had crenelations to provide protection for defenders faced with a rearward attack. In front of the keep was a ditch, accessed via a gate at the rear of the fort. It had four caponiers that guarded the angles and were accessed via passages through the underlying structure. An inner ditch around the keep was covered by a further three caponiers and two demi-caponiers which led into the earthwork ramparts in one direction and into the keep in the other. The keep could also be accessed via a bridge which connected it with the terreplein.

== Operational history ==
Grain Fort's initial armament consisted of 13 heavy RMLs (six 11-inch, four 9-inch and three 64-pdr. guns). By the end of the 19th century these had been replaced by four much more powerful guns: two 9.2-inch Mark X breech-loading guns and two 4.7-inch guns. The original thirteen emplacements were reduced to five by 1895. The fort continued in use during the Second World War and underwent further alterations when its two existing 6-inch close defence guns were enclosed within bomb-proof shelters. Fire control positions were also added, along with spigot mortars at each end of the terreplein. In 1956 the fort was decommissioned and sold to the local authority five years later, following which the surface buildings were demolished.

To supplement the fort's firepower, two additional gun batteries were subsequently constructed nearby. These were Grain Wing Battery (constructed 1890–95) 50 metres (160 ft) south of Grain Fort, and Dummy Battery (constructed 1861–68), about 1 kilometre (0.62 mi) south of the fort. Neither was used for long before they were disarmed and used for other purposes, and both were decommissioned and sold off along with Grain Fort.

== Current status ==
Little is now visible of Grain Fort above the ground. In addition to the keep's demolition, the spaces within which the surface buildings once stood have been filled with rubble and rubbish. The fort's earthworks and a brick revetment still survive and a path links the concrete aprons of the infilled gun emplacements. The front caponiers are buried but have also survived mostly intact. Magazines and tunnels still exist within the subsurface structure and have been visited by urban explorers. Many of the fittings are reported to still survive. The site of the fort is now within the Isle of Grain Coastal Park, which is managed by the Friends of the Coastal Park in partnership with its owners, St James Parish Council. The fort is part of a scheduled monument designated in 1976 to cover "coastal artillery defences on the Isle of Grain, immediately east and south east of Grain village".

== Bibliography ==
- Hogg, Ian V (1974). Coast Defences of England and Wales 1856-1956. David & Charles. ISBN 0-7153 6353-0.
