= Garrison Point Fort =

- Sheerness, Kent, England
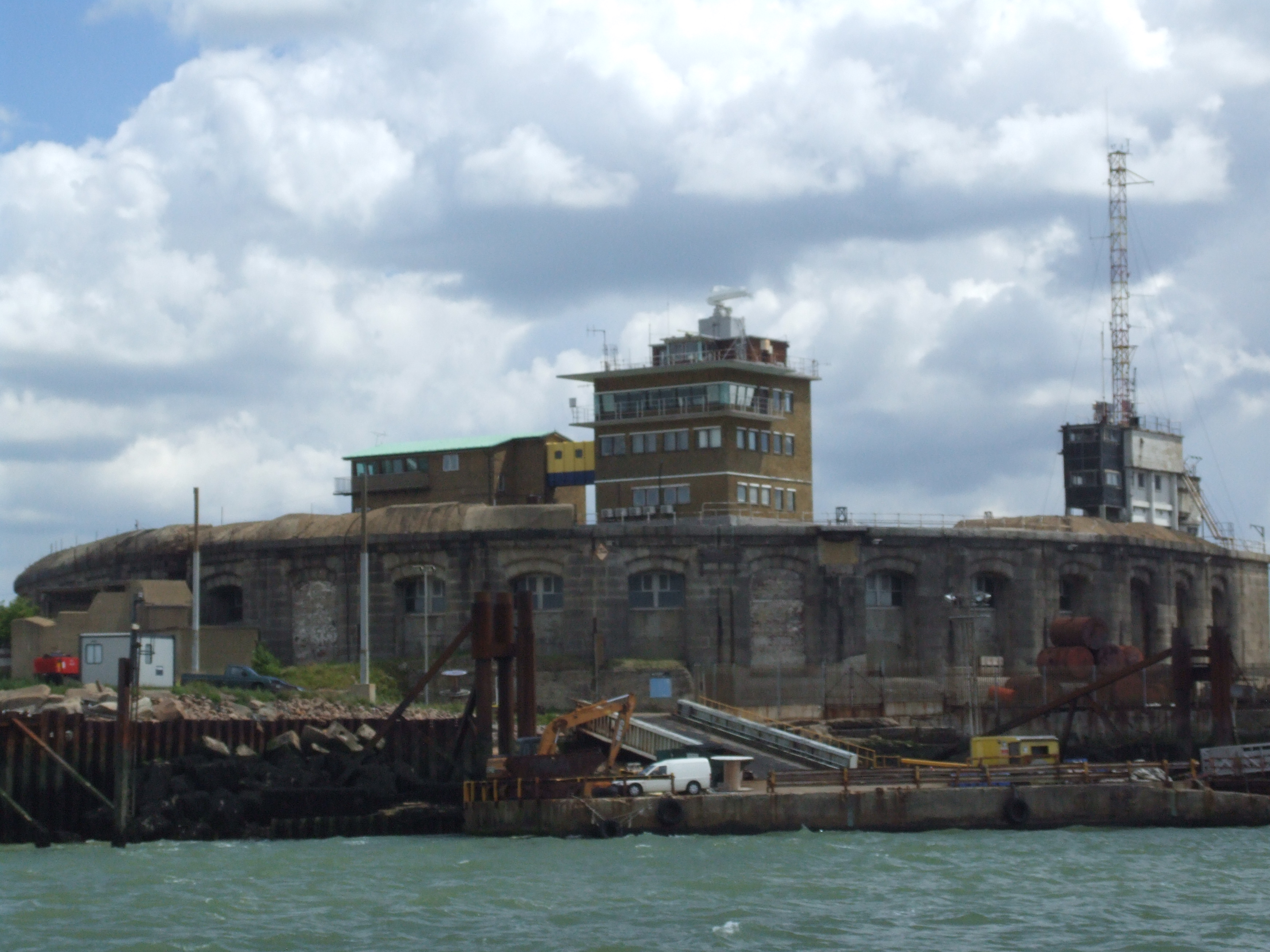
- Garrison Point Fort viewed from the Medway

Site information
- Type: Fortification
- Owner: Medway Ports Ltd
- Condition: Intact

Location
- Coordinates: 51.4469°N 0.74441°E

Site history
- Built: 1861–72
- Built by: United Kingdom
- In use: 1872–1956
- Materials: Concrete, granite, brick

Garrison Point Fort is a former artillery fort situated at the end of the Garrison Point peninsula at Sheerness on the Isle of Sheppey in Kent. Built in the 1860s in response to concerns about a possible French invasion, it was the last in a series of artillery batteries that had existed on the site since the mid-16th century. The fort's position enabled it to guard the strategic point where the River Medway meets the Thames. It is a rare example of a two-tiered casemated fort – one of only two of that era in the country – with a design that is otherwise similar to that of several of the other forts along the lower Thames. It remained operational until 1956 and is now used by the Sheerness Docks as a port installation.

== Strategic context ==
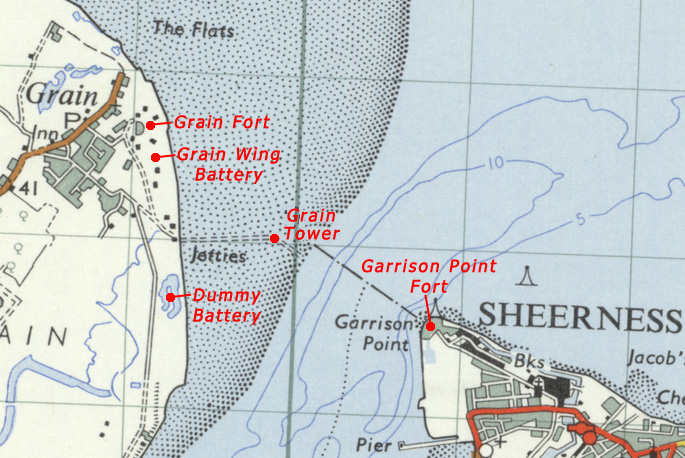
Map of the fortifications at the entrance to the Medway

The fort was constructed in response to a naval arms race between Britain and France. Britain's coastal defences had not been substantially upgraded since the Napoleonic Wars, but a new generation of accurate and powerful guns, mounted on fast-moving, manoeuvrable iron-clad warships, had obsoleted the existing 18th and early 19th century forts along the British coastline. The Thames was seen as particularly vulnerable; as well as being one of the country's most important trade routes, it possessed several naval installations of great importance, including the victualling yards at Deptford, the armaments works of Woolwich Arsenal, the shipbuilding yards at North Woolwich, and the magazines at Purfleet.

The government's response to the increased threat was to appoint a Royal Commission on the Defence of the United Kingdom, which published a far-reaching report in 1860. It recommended that many existing forts should be upgraded or rebuilt entirely, and that new forts should be constructed to guard particularly strategic or vulnerable points along the coast. In all, around 70 forts and batteries were constructed around the English coast as a result of the Royal Commission's report.

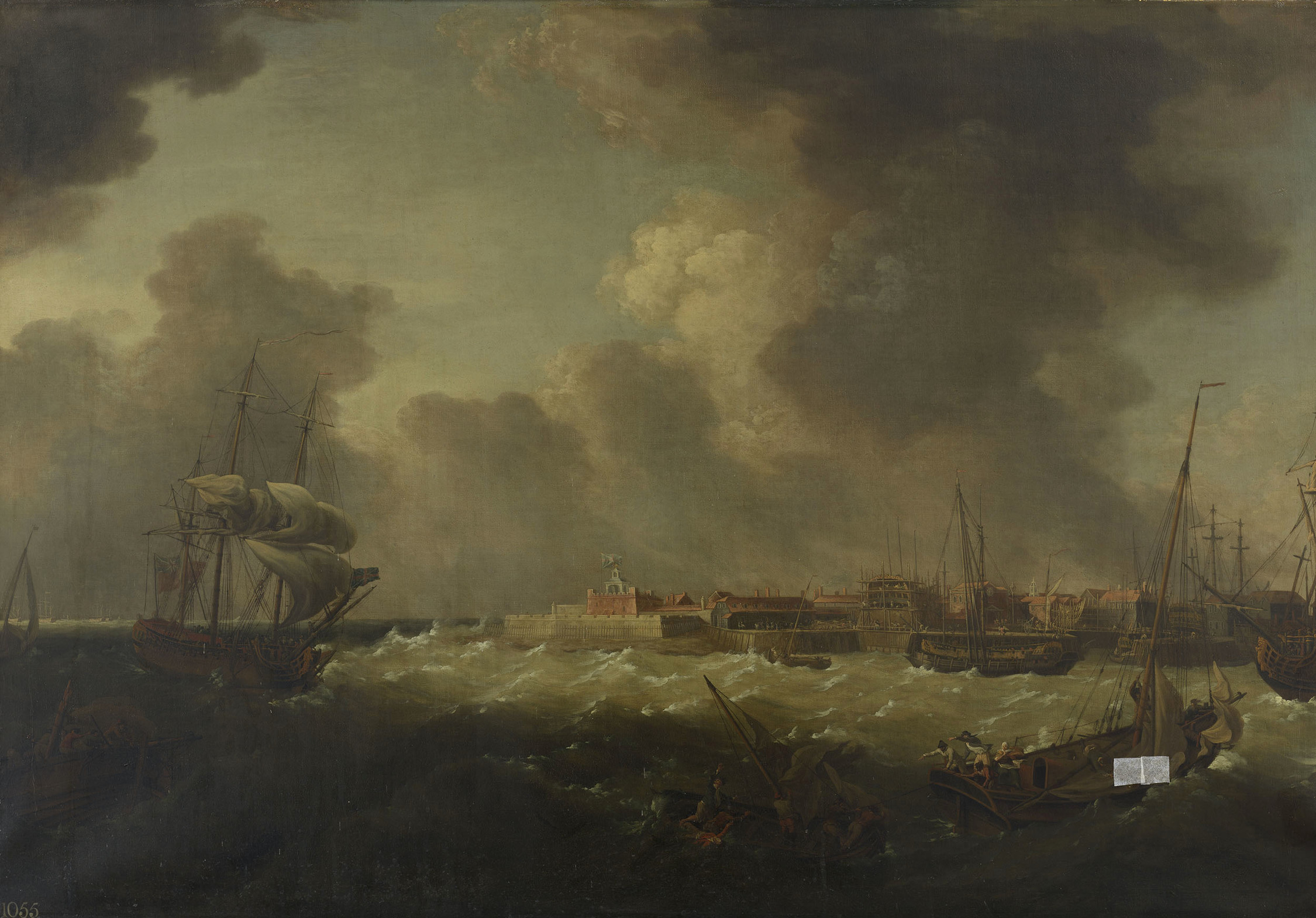
De Gomme's fort (centre) alongside the Dockyard (Richard Paton, c.1775).

Garrison Point had long been fortified. A square blockhouse was constructed there by 1547, during the reign of Henry VIII. It was in the process of being replaced with a new fort when it was destroyed in the June 1667 Raid on the Medway during the Second Anglo-Dutch War. It was rebuilt as a bastion fort by 1669 to a design by Bernard de Gomme, who also designed Tilbury Fort further upriver. Two additional fortifications, the Half Moon Battery and Cavalier Battery, were subsequently added to further strengthen the defences. The Royal Commission recommended that de Gomme's red brick fortification and the two later batteries, which were incapable of withstanding modern guns, should be replaced by an armoured artillery fort on the same site. Its arc of fire would overlap that of Grain Fort and Grain Tower (and later Grain Wing Battery and Dummy Battery) on the other side of the Medway on the Isle of Grain.

== Construction and layout ==
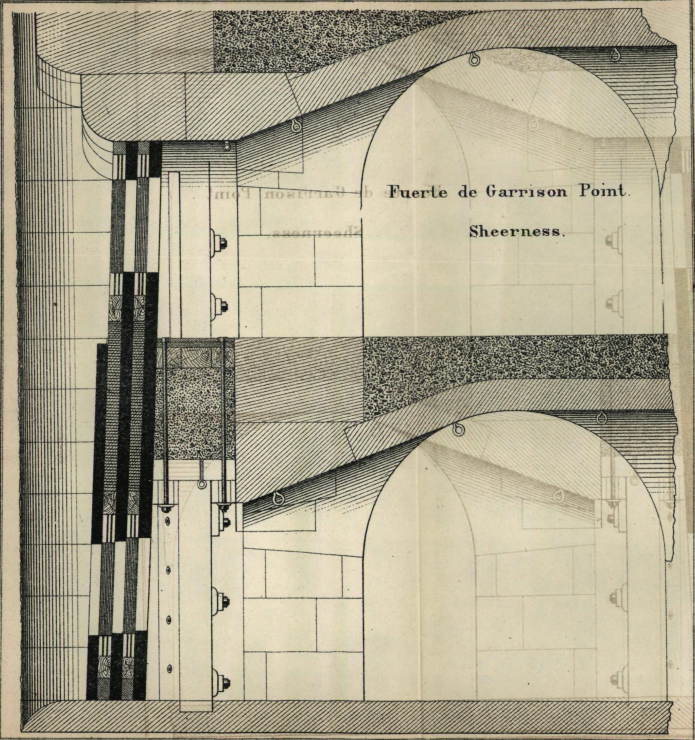

Construction began in February 1861 and continued until the last of its shielding was installed in June 1872, by which time about half of the guns were already in place. The new fort took the form of a semi-circular structure, one of only two built in the 1860s fortification programme (the other being Picklecombe Fort in Cornwall). It had two gun floors, each with 17 granite-faced casemates, in which 36 heavy guns were mounted behind 2,000 tons of iron shields. Another two gun turrets were planned for the roof but were not built. The magazines were located below ground in the basement of the fort. The bulk of the structure was built of brick, with concrete additions. The walls and piers are 4.4 metres (14 ft) thick. The semi-circular row of casemates is closed off to the rear by a row of defensible buildings constructed from ashlar blocks of Kentish ragstone, with loopholes and gun ports in the flanks to facilitate close defence of the fort. A parade ground occupied the middle of the fort.

== Operational history ==
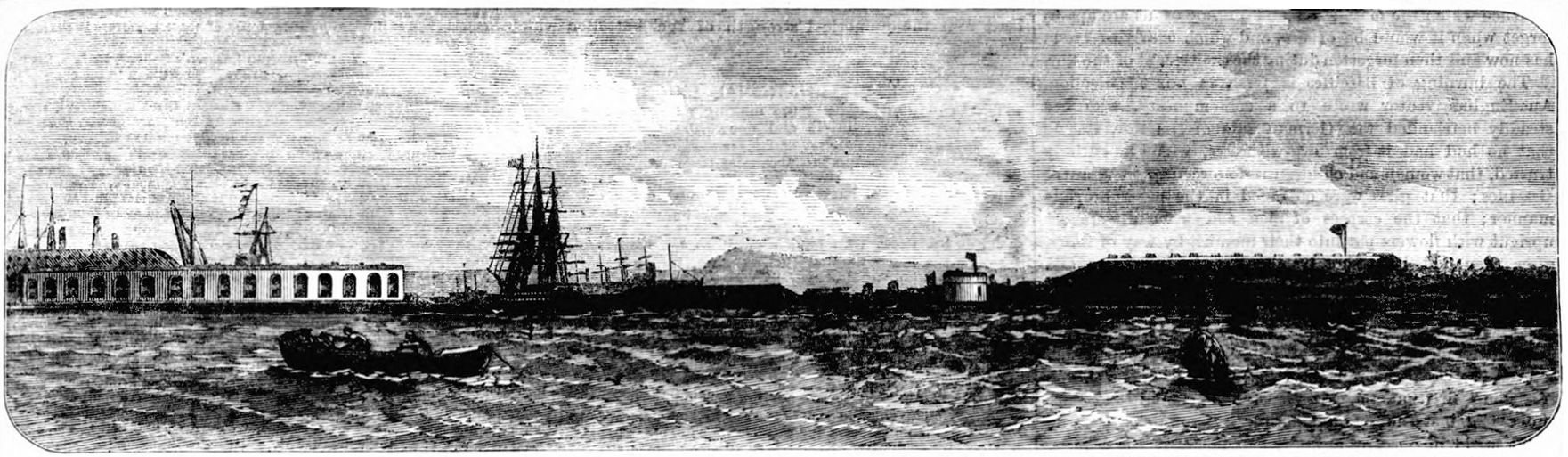
Forts at the mouth of the River Medway, 1870 engraving

Garrison Point Fort was initially armed with 9-inch and 10-inch rifled muzzle loader (RML) guns. By 1880 its armament had been expanded to include 9-inch, 10-inch, 11-inch and 12.5-inch RMLs. A Brennan torpedo station, used to launch wire-guided torpedoes, was added to the fort's structure in 1884 and remained in use until around 1906. The RMLs were obsolete by the end of the 19th century and had been removed by 1896, when the casemates were all converted to barracks and stores. In 1909 two 6-inch Mk. VII breech-loading (BL) guns were mounted on the fort's roof and four 12-pounder quick-firing guns were installed in a lower tier of the casemates.

A coastal artillery searchlight and concrete magazine were constructed to the east of the fort during the First World War, along with a machine-gun pillbox that no longer survives. Garrison Point Fort remained in service through the Second World War and was re-armed with two twin 6-pounder Quick Firing (QF) guns to defend against fast-moving attackers such as E-boats and destroyers. One of them was mounted on the fort's roof and the other was situated outside the front of the casemates. New gun emplacements, gun towers, a magazine and a searchlight emplacement were all constructed at this time. By 1944 the threat of invasion or seaborne attack had diminished to the point that the fort was reduced to care and maintenance status.

After the war, the fort was used by the Royal Navy Auxiliary Service as an emergency port control centre in the event of a nuclear war. Part of the fort's disused magazine was converted into a bunker housing nuclear defence officials. The fort was decommissioned in 1956 when the UK discontinued its coastal defence programme, and the structure was sold off to the owners of the adjacent Sheerness Docks.

== Current status ==
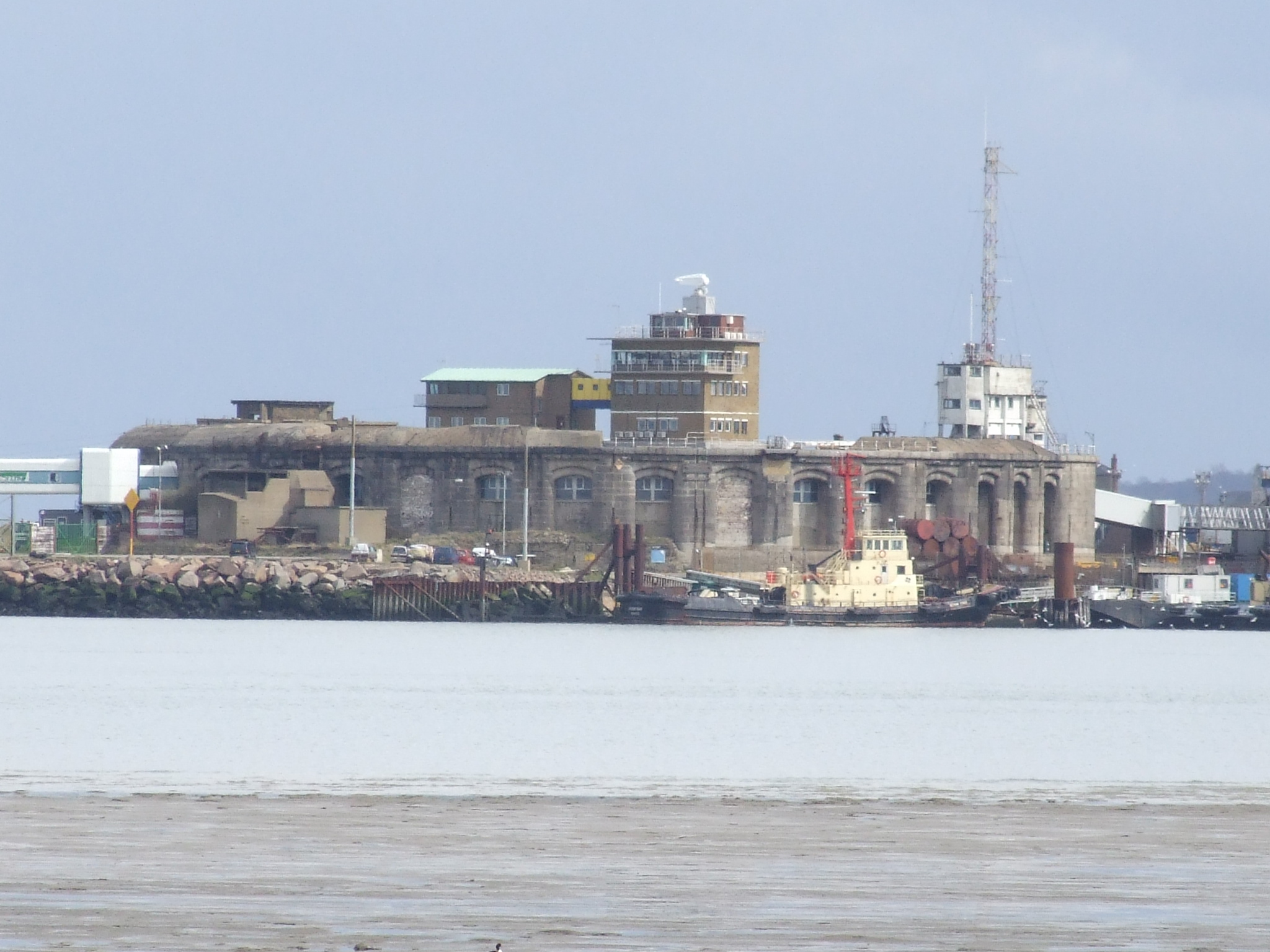
Garrison Point Fort, 2008

The fort has been a Grade II listed building since 1977 and is part of the wider system of the Sheerness defences, listed as a scheduled monument. It is owned by Medway Ports Ltd, the operators of the Sheerness Docks, and is not publicly accessible as it lies within the port area. Some alterations have been made to the fort to enable its use in connection with the port. It was used for a time in the 1980s as a terminal for a now-defunct ferry service to the Continent, which involved fitting a walkway to the ferries through one of the casemates. A navigational radar control tower was installed on the fort's roof in 1962.

Garrison Point Fort is reportedly in a state of "slow decay" which has led it to be listed on the Heritage at Risk Register. Although the interior has been largely stripped out, traces remain of the original fittings. A considerable amount remains of the Brennan Torpedo station and its launching rails, though it is corroding badly. While the fort's structure is still basically intact its roof and much of its interior are derelict and decaying.
