= Woodlands Redoubt =

Coordinates: 51.3835°N 00.5796°E

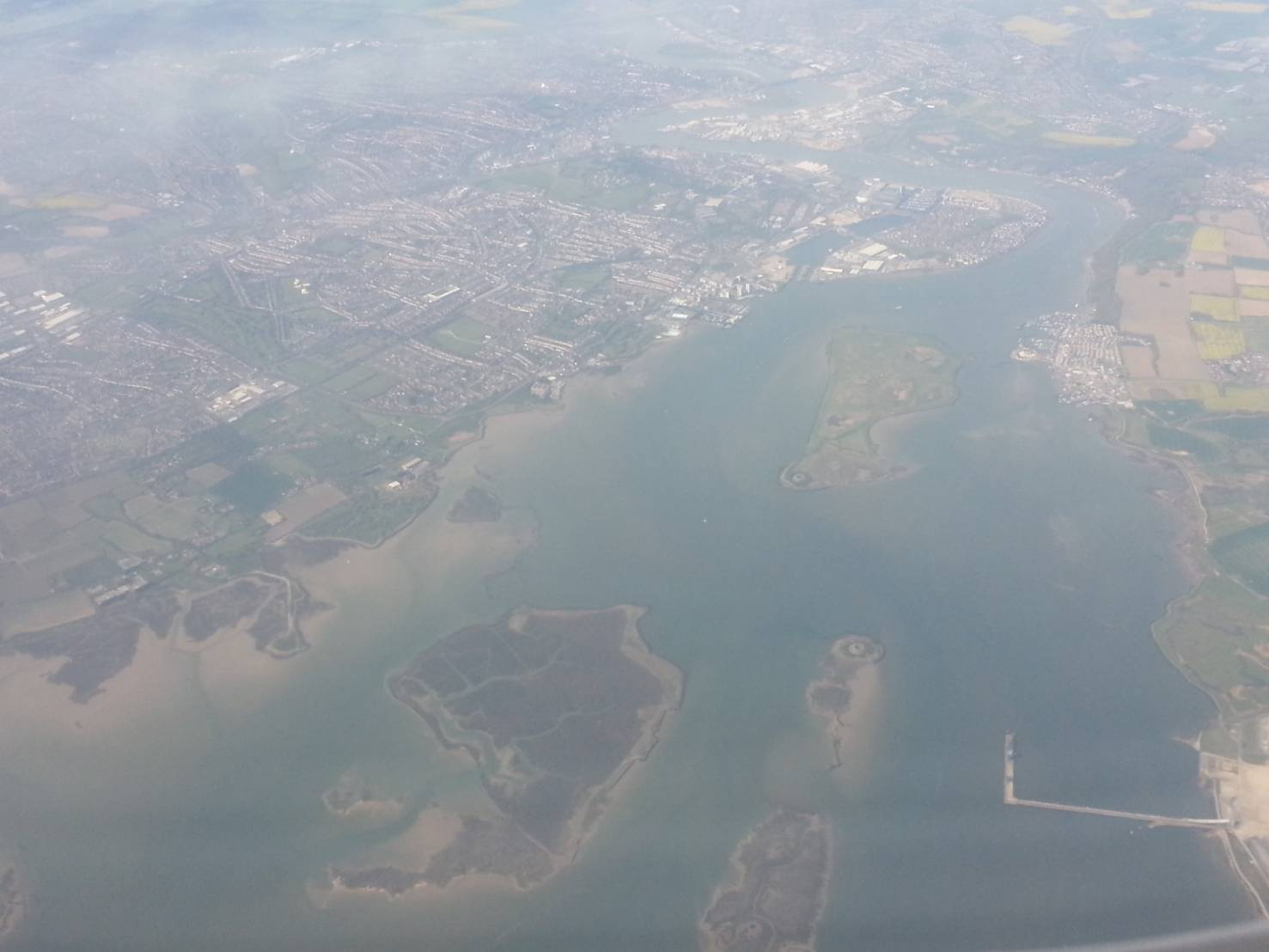
Aerial view of Woodlands Redoubt, with Grange Redoubt also in view

Woodlands Redoubt, also known as one of the two Twydall Redoubts, was constructed in 1888. It was not included in the original list of defensive structures proposed by the Royal Commission on the Defence of the United Kingdom in 1860, but was conceived later and implemented as an experimental redoubt as opposed to a more substantial fort.

In conjunction with Grange Redoubt its function was to defend Chatham Dockyard against landward attack from the east.
