= Grange Redoubt =

Coordinates: 51.3869°N 00.5826°E

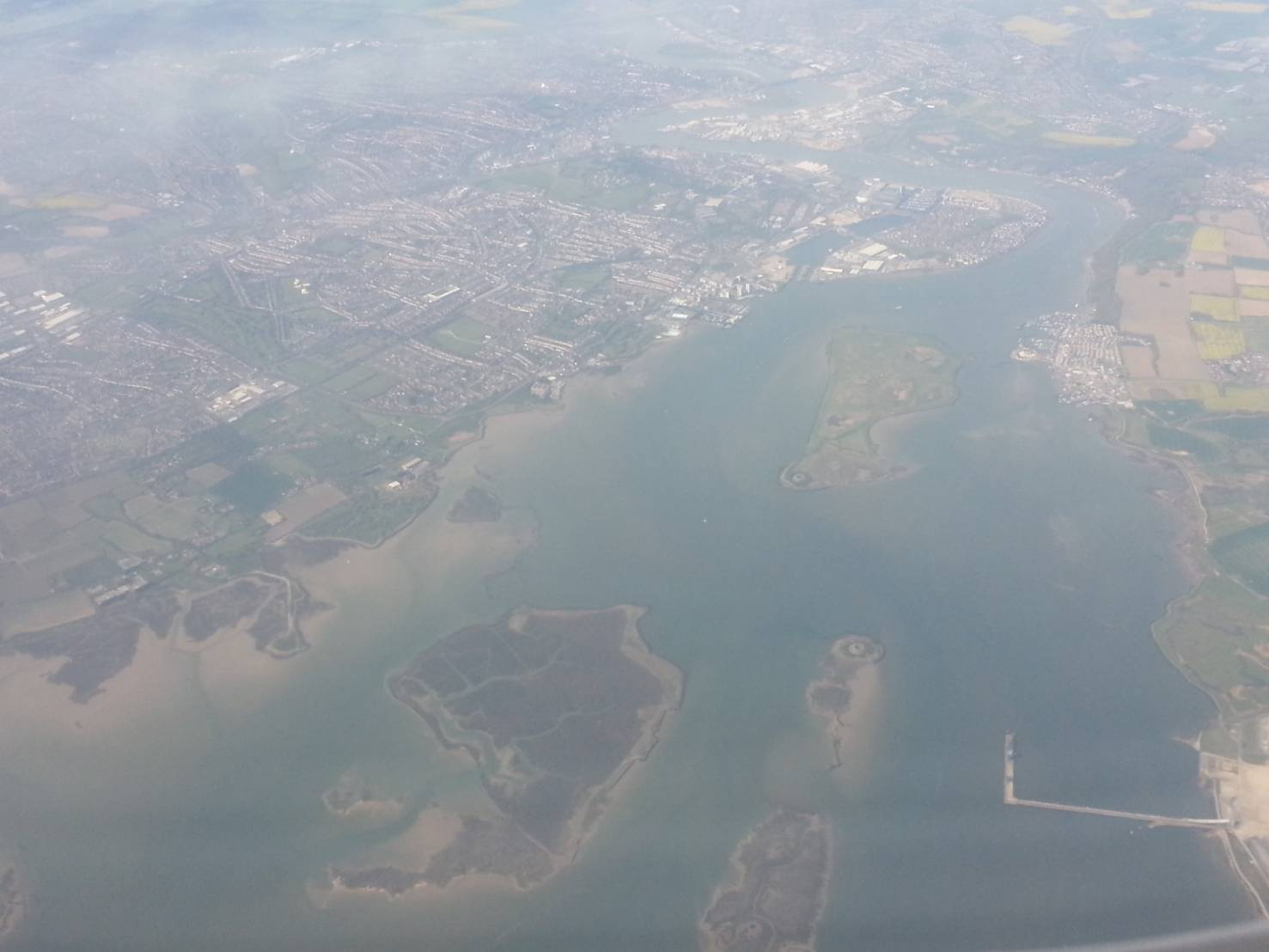
Aerial view of Grange Redoubt, with the Woodlands Redoubt also in view

Grange Redoubt, also known as one of the two Twydall Redoubts, was constructed in 1885. It was not included in the original list of defensive structures proposed by the Royal Commission on the Defence of the United Kingdom in 1860, but was conceived later and implemented as an experimental redoubt as opposed to a more substantial fort.

Grange and Woodlands Redoubts defended Chatham Dockyard against landward attack from the east.
