= Grain Tower =

19th-century English gun tower

- Grain, Kent, England
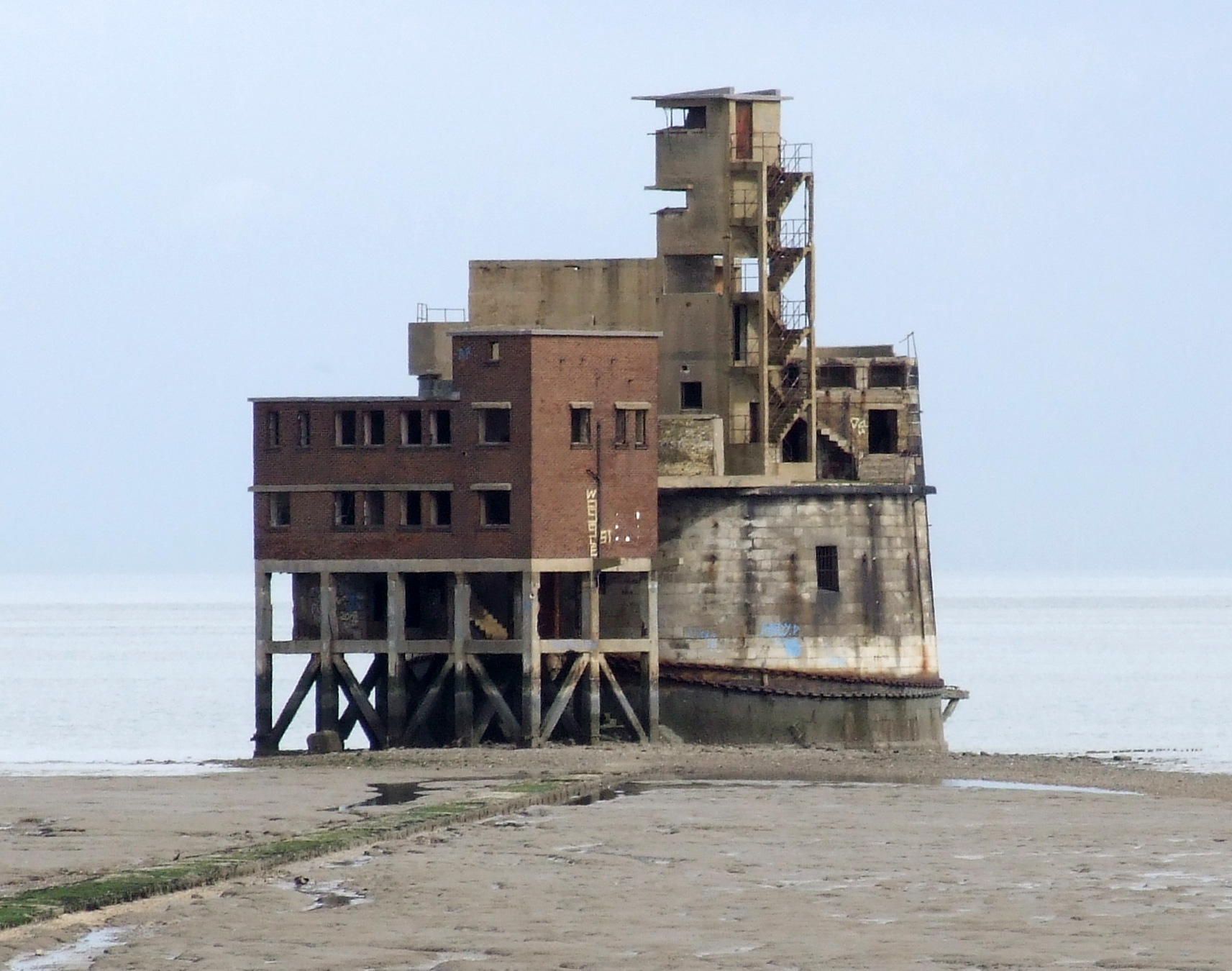
- Grain Tower at low tide

Site information
- Type: Fortification
- Owner: Private owners
- Condition: Poor condition, derelict and decaying

Location
- Coordinates: 51.45168°N 0.73125°E

Site history
- Built: 1848–1855
- Built by: United Kingdom
- In use: 1857–1956
- Materials: Concrete, granite, brick

Grain Tower is a mid-19th-century gun tower situated offshore just east of Grain, Kent, standing in the mouth of the River Medway. It was built along the same lines as the Martello towers that were constructed along the British and Irish coastlines in the early 19th century and is the last-built example of a gun tower of this type. It was built to protect the important dockyards at Sheerness and Chatham from a perceived French naval threat during a period of tension in the 1850s.

Rapid improvements to artillery technology in the mid-19th century meant that the tower was effectively obsolete as soon as it had been completed. A proposal to turn it into a casemated fort was dropped for being too expensive. By the end of the 19th century the tower had gained a new significance as a defence against raids by fast torpedo boats. It was used in both the First and Second World Wars, when its fabric was substantially altered to support new quick-firing guns. It was decommissioned in 1956 and remains derelict today. The tower has been privately owned since 2005 and was reportedly sold to a new owner in 2014 for £400,000. And since then it has been re sold again on September 20th 2023 for £159,000 to another private buyer.

Today, Grain Tower stands abandoned in the River Medway as one of Britain's last surviving offshore gun towers. Despite decades of neglect and exposure to the elements, it remains an important reminder of Victorian coastal defence and continues to attract historians, photographers, and people interested in military architecture.

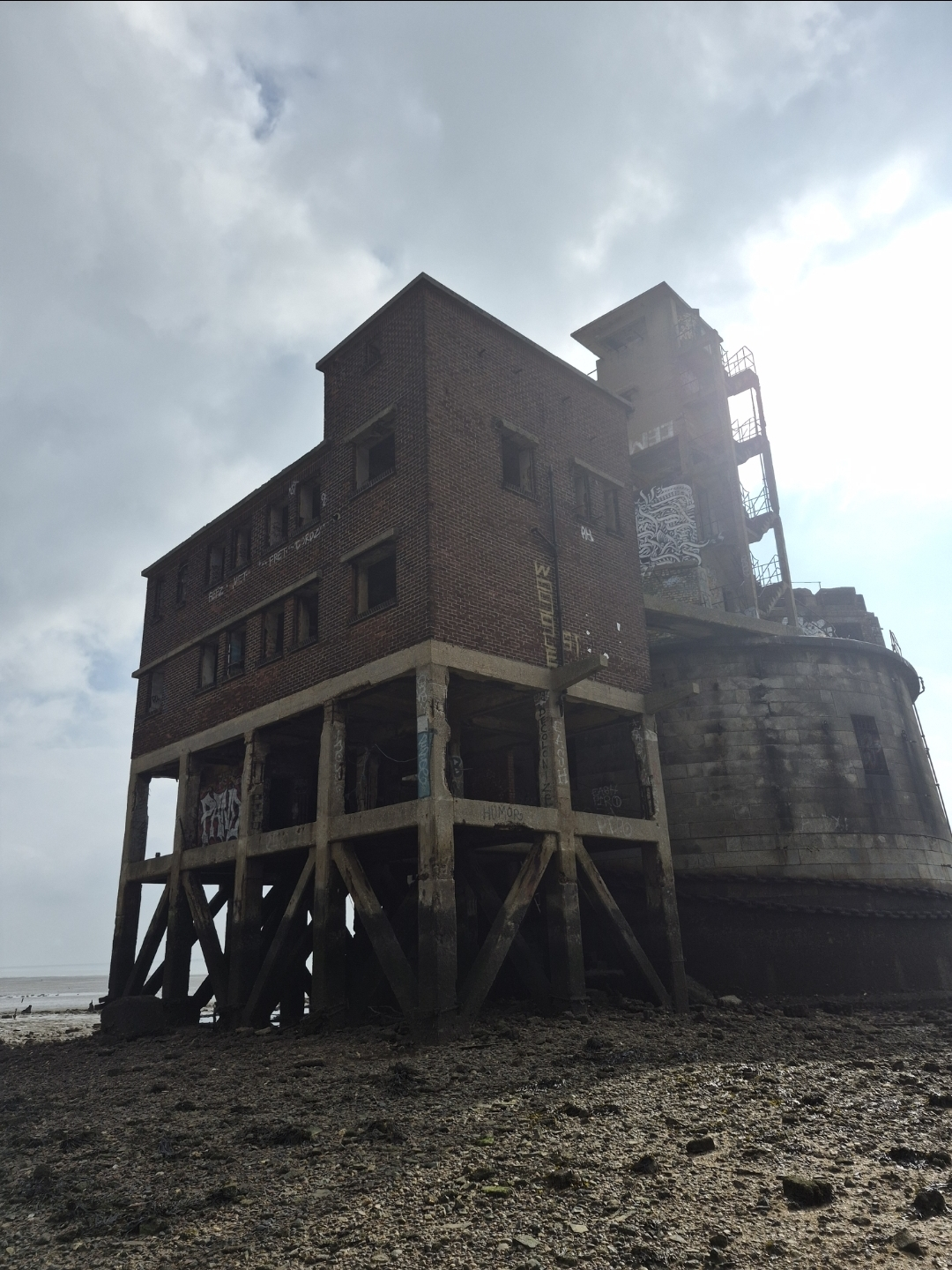
Image of grain battery tower at low tide

== Context and construction ==
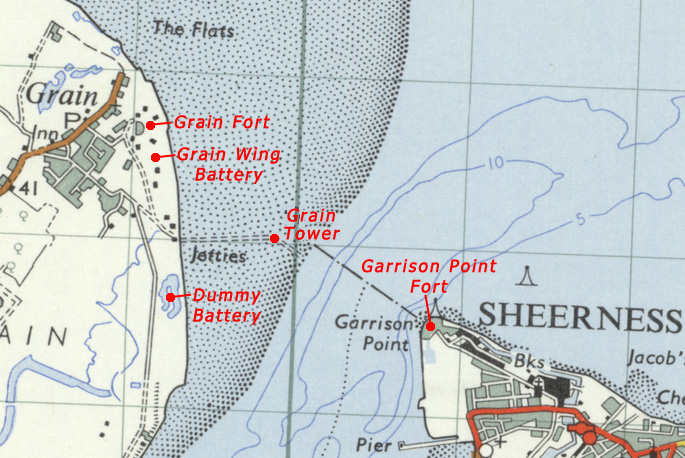
Map of the fortifications at the entrance to the Medway

At the time of the tower's construction, there were widespread fears that the imperial rivalry between Britain and France could result in a French invasion or naval incursion along the River Thames. The Thames was seen as particularly vulnerable; as well as being one of the UK's most important trade routes, it possessed several naval installations of great importance, including the victualling yards at Deptford, the armaments works of Woolwich Arsenal, the shipbuilding yards at North Woolwich, and the magazines at Purfleet. The Medway also had major installations, notably the Chatham Dockyard, which had been targeted to devastating effect by the Dutch during the Second Anglo-Dutch War in 1667. It was thus deemed essential to prevent an enemy entering the Medway and reaching the dockyard.

Grain Tower stands about 500 metres (1,600 ft) offshore at the eastern tip of the Isle of Grain, where the mouth of the Medway meets the Thames. It was constructed on the tidal sandbank of Grain Spit and is reached by a causeway running in an east–west direction from the shoreline. Its location enabled the tower's arc of fire to overlap with that of the guns at Garrison Point on the Isle of Sheppey, on the other side of the Medway.

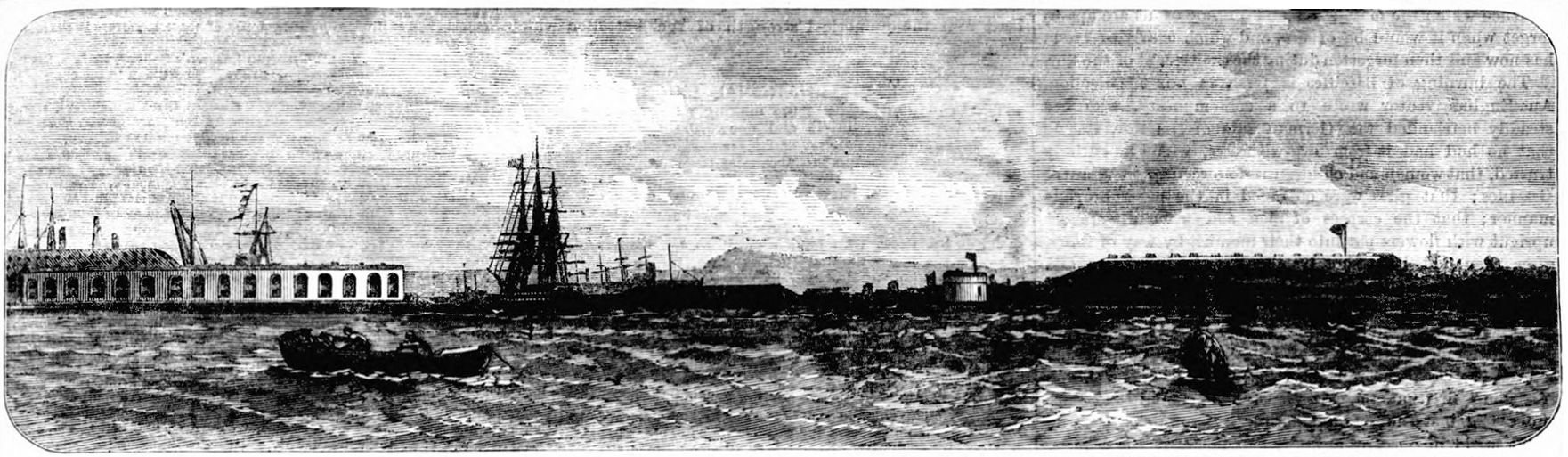
1870 view of the forts at the mouth of the Medway: (left to right) Garrison Point, Grain Tower, Grain Fort

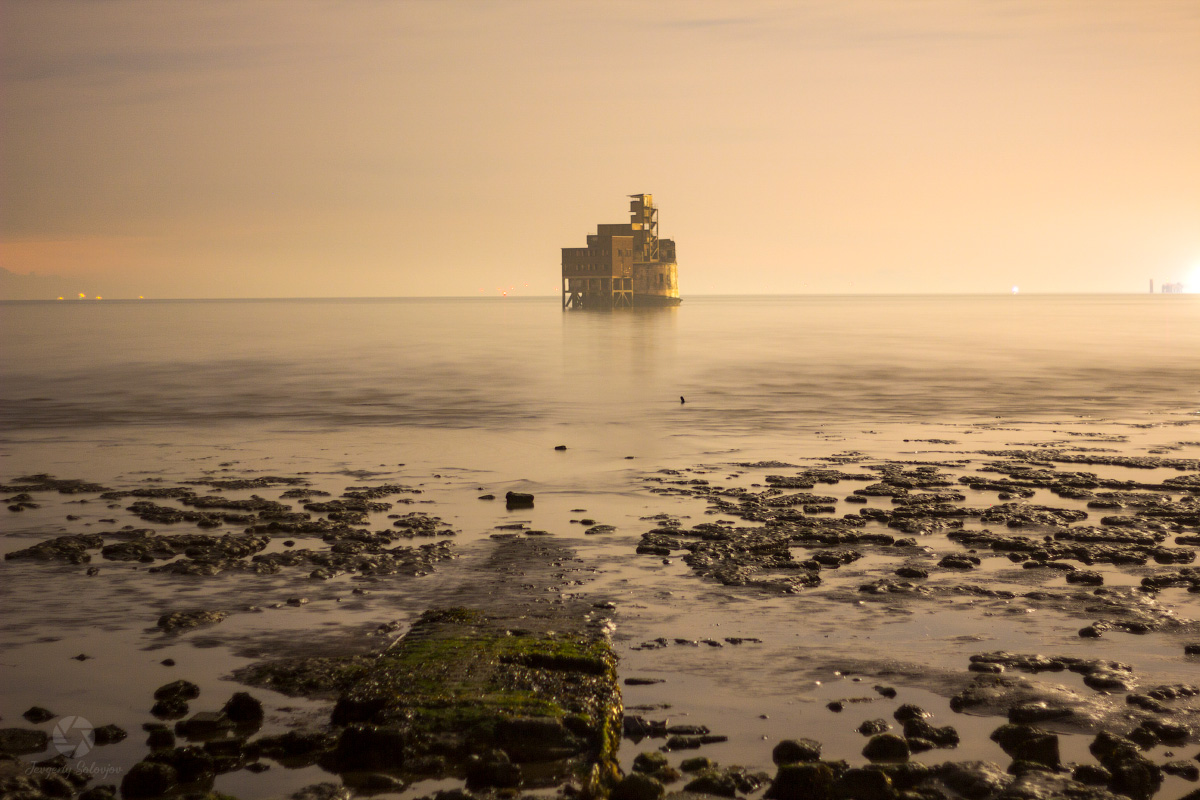
Grain Tower Battery, Rochester, United Kingdom, 2019

Construction began in 1848 but difficulties were soon encountered in laying the foundations and construction paused until 1853. It took nearly two years for the Lincolnshire builders Kirk and Parry to construct the rest of the tower; as the York Herald newspaper noted, "from the exposed situation of the tower, which is subject to the sea and weather, very great difficulties were experienced during the winter months in proceeding with the work." It was completed in late 1855 and was handed over to the Ordnance authorities on 17 November that year. By this point it had gone more than 50 per cent over budget, costing £16,798 (equivalent to £1,642,310 today).

The tower stands three storeys high, faced in granite ashlar, and is roughly oval in shape. Its base is 21.8 by 19.3 metres (72 by 63 ft), its original height was 12.9 metres (42 ft), and it has walls 3.6 metres (12 ft) thick. The gun crews lived in barrack accommodation within the tower, which also housed stores and ammunition. Its overall design is similar to that of a Martello tower, dozens of which were built around the coasts of Britain and Ireland during the Napoleonic Wars at the start of the 19th century; it can be considered the last Martello tower to be built in Britain although the similar Bréhon Tower off the coast of Guernsey was finished in 1857.

== Operational history ==
The tower was initially armed with three smoothbore 68-pounder gun guns which were mounted on traversing platforms on the roof and fired en barbette. Although Martello-style towers were well able to resist the smoothbore guns of the early 19th century, the development of a new generation of much more powerful rifled muzzle loader (RML) guns made Grain Tower obsolete as soon as it had been completed.

The tower's weakness to fire from rifled guns was never fully addressed. A fresh invasion scare at the end of the 1850s prompted the British government to appoint a Royal Commission on the Defence of the United Kingdom, which published a far-reaching report in 1860. It recommended that many existing forts should be upgraded or rebuilt entirely, and that new forts should be constructed to guard particularly strategic or vulnerable points along the coast. In all, around 70 forts and batteries were constructed around the English coast as a result of the Royal Commission's report. The Commission recommended that Grain Tower should be turned into a fully casemated fort, which would be built around the existing structure. However, the cost of doing this was seen as excessive and the proposal was dropped as part of a cost-cutting exercise to reduce the overall cost of the fort-building programme. Instead, a new Grain Fort was built on land, while the existing battery at Garrison Point was rebuilt as the two-tier casemated Garrison Point Fort.

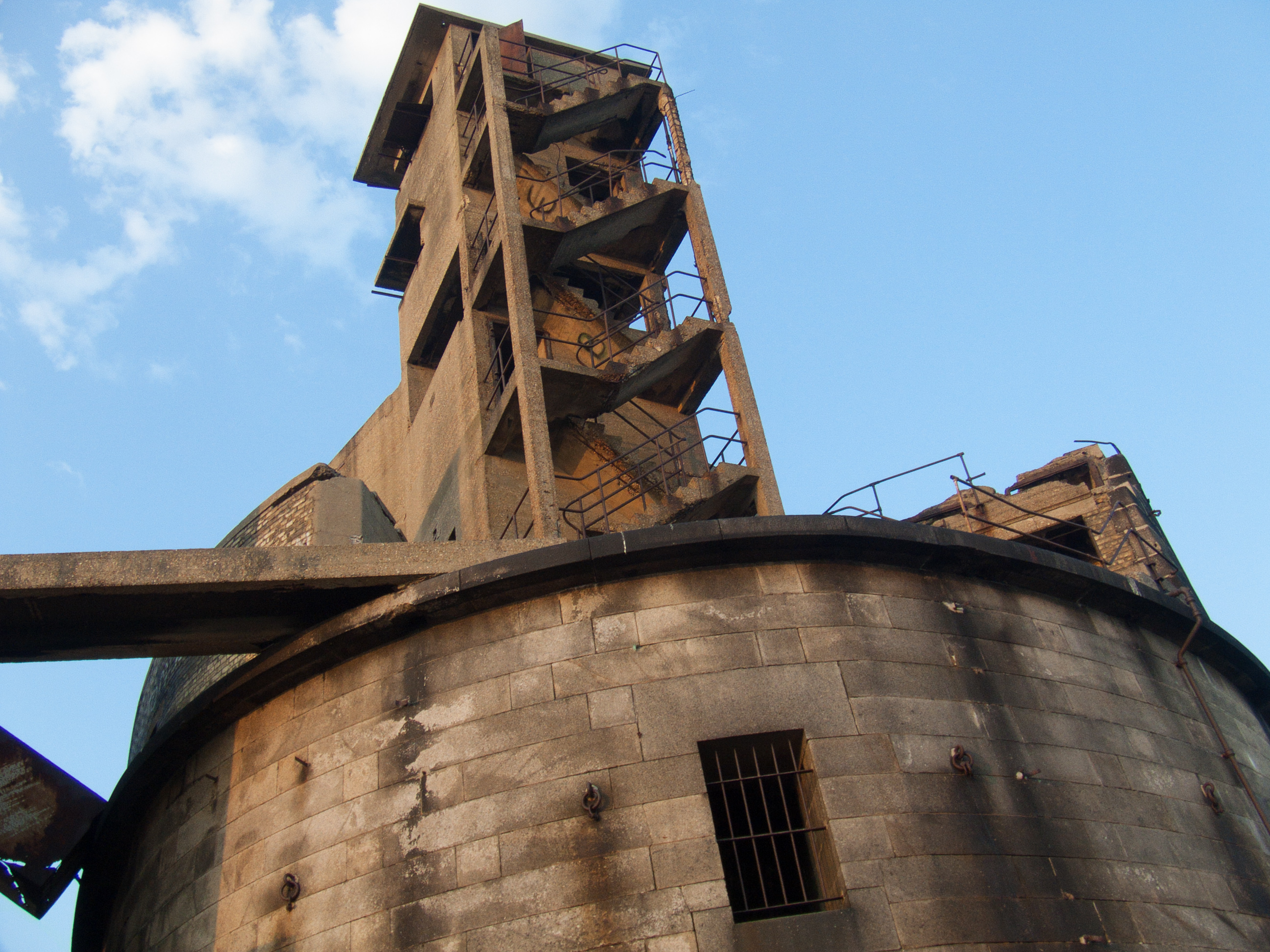
Close-up view of the Second World War fire director tower built on top of Grain Tower

The tower's smoothbore guns were soon replaced with RMLs: one 56-pounder and two 32-pounders. These were withdrawn as late as 1910, when the tower was repurposed as a communications tower. In 1915, two 4.7-inch quick-firing (QF) guns were moved from Grain Wing Battery and installed on Grain Tower to counter the new threat of fast torpedo boats. This required the construction of a raised concrete and stone structure on the tower's roof within which the new guns were emplaced, and a shelter was created to provide room for detachments, stores and fire control. The body of the tower was also altered to upgrade the ammunition storage.

The guns remained in place through the First World War, when the Grain Tower found an additional purpose as one end of a boom defence stretching across the Medway to Sheerness. The massive iron chain from the boom is still present, wrapped around the base of the tower. A fixed timber section of the boom stood between the tower and the shoreline. The tower was disarmed in 1929.

During the Second World War much bigger changes were made when the tower became the location, in 1939, for a twin 6-pounder QF gun. A large roofed concrete emplacement was constructed on the roof to house the gun with a tall directing tower at its rear. A Defence Electric Light Emplacement was also added to the fabric of Grain Tower. At the tower's rear, a brick and concrete barrack block standing on stilts was constructed to house the gun detachment. It is a freestanding structure but is connected to the tower via catwalks. In 1944 the tower was reduced to care and maintenance status before being decommissioned in 1956.

== Current status ==
Grain Tower remains intact, though it is listed as "at risk" due to its poor condition and ongoing decay. English Heritage designated the tower as a Grade II listed building in 1986, forming part of a broader scheduled monument designated in 1976 to cover "coastal artillery defences on the Isle of Grain, immediately east and south east of Grain village". There is no public access, though it is reported to be used informally by anglers and has been visited by urban explorers.

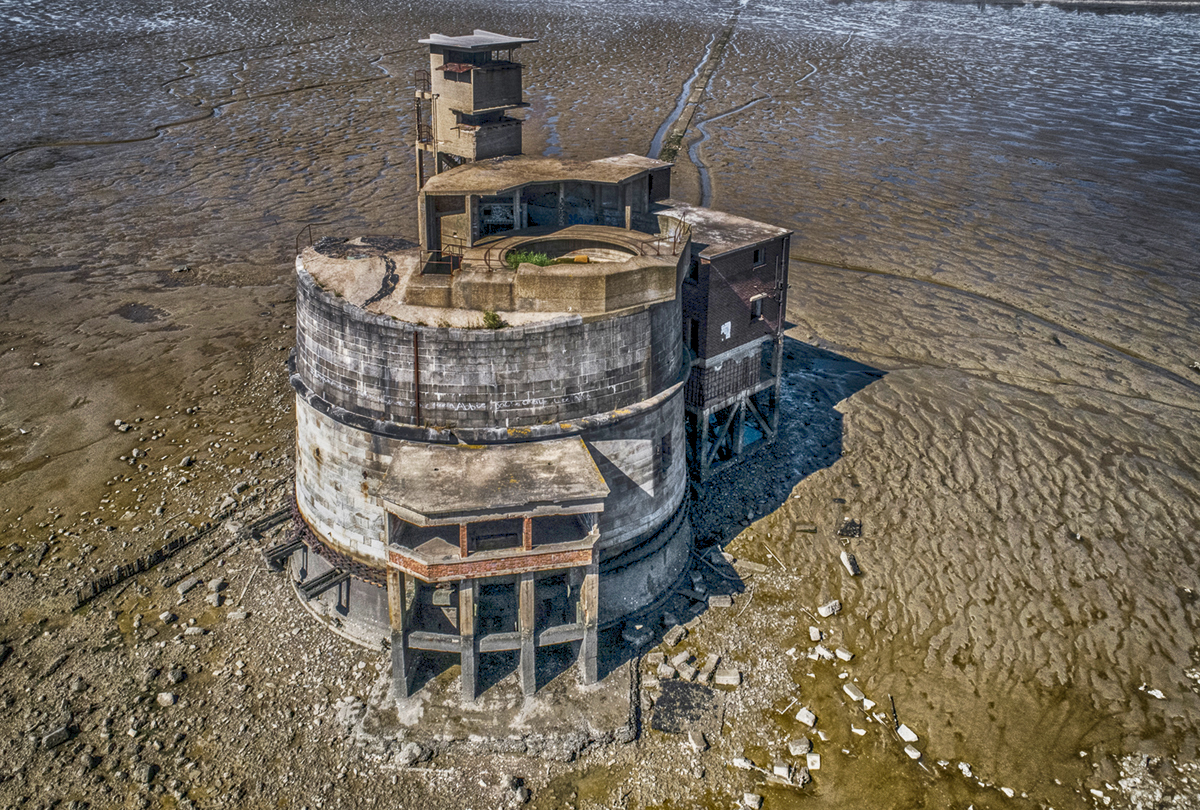
The Grain Tower Battery in July 2018

In 2005 a private owner purchased it from the Crown Estate and put it up for sale again from 2010, with a guide price of £500,000. The owner, a south-east London builder named Simon Cowper, said that "it just didn't work out well as a home – plus the cost of doing it [up]." It was reportedly sold in 2014 for £400,000, though the new owner wished to remain "under the radar" until they had secured planning permission for renovations. In September 2023, it was listed for sale once again at a much-reduced auction guide price of £150,000 with Savills Property Auctions, by order of LPA Receivers, the hammer price being £159,000.
