= Fort Luton =

Coordinates: 51°21′58″N 0°31′50″E

Fort Luton was built between 1876 and 1892 south of Chatham, Medway, South East England. It is one of the five late Victorian land front forts built to defend the overland approaches to Chatham. It is the smallest of the Chatham forts and was built near to the village of Luton.

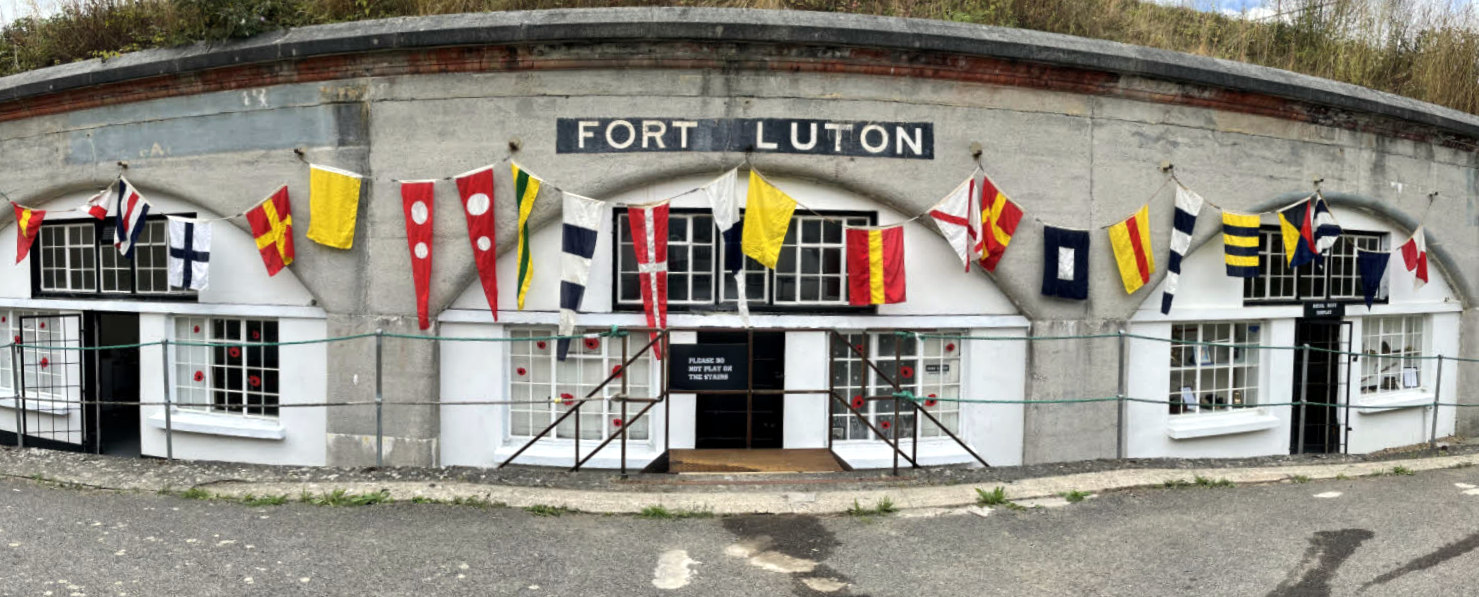
Fort Luton

== Construction and purpose ==
The fort was ordered under the auspices of the 1859/60 Royal Commission on the Defences of the United Kingdom, but it was deleted by Parliament in an attempt to save money and divert funds to the construction of the sea forts, and the Land Front Forts of Milford Haven, Plymouth, Cork and Portsmouth/ Isle of Wight Fortresses. The 1869 'Report on the Construction Condition and Costs of Fortification' criticised the lack of landward protection for Chatham, yet it was not until 1872 that the Treasury relented and the land was purchased. Even so, it was not until 1876 that the order was given by the War Office, after approval by Parliament for construction to commence. The original design was by William Jervois, but as by 1876 he had been promoted to major general he had no further part in its planning. The work was surveyed and "pegged out" on the ground that same year. In 1877 work on the building started, using convict labour and an 18 in (457 mm) gauge light railway to bring up the materials from Borstal Creek jetty.

The method adopted was to build all structures directly on to the land surface, and no form of preparation tunnelling was attempted. The work was slow due to lack of funds and the insistence of using convict labour, which meant that the labour force was constantly changing due to release or transfers to other prisons. In 1882 the work stopped for a re-think and once again restarted in 1886 when the decision was taken to delete from the plan one quarter of the design. This meant the loss of the Main Magazine (which was to have been in the western corner) and one quarter of this structure survived, much modified to become the above ground water tank. The well was also removed from the plan so the 4 inches (100 mm) water main had to be laid from Fort Horsted and the proposed under-bridge caponier was never even started. From 1886 to 1892, when the fort was finally completed, the ditch was dug and the spoil was used to cover the exposed buildings, some of which had been standing for over ten years, and to form the ramparts, the six very basic gun emplacements, two to each flank and a pair overlooking Luton Valley. Even so, no armament is on record as ever having been issued to Fort Luton other than that brought in by units participating in the Annual Militia and Volunteer camps. The final act of engineering was the installation of the drawbridge in 1892 which is a rare type of rolling bridge and possibly the only one still left in the UK

== Siege trials ==
For the next thirteen years the fort was used for summer camps and, on alternate years, the Chatham Siege Trials. The final one in 1907 was the largest in both scope and number of men employed, and was in effect a rehearsal for a major war. Three breaches were made in the counterscarp wall and three "camoflets" were exploded in the moat bottom. The "defenders" dug a large counter-mine shaft outwards from the base of the moat. The breaches were repaired in 1908 by infilling with flint rubble, but the main counter-mine shaft was left. As a result of all this, in 1914, the north scarp wall shifted slightly and had to be braced by a steel joist from off the top of the counterscarp wall. The damage to the moat and the subsequent repair are still visible.

== Layout of the fort ==
The Fort consists of a D-shaped rampart with prepared earthen gun positions for movable armament, two to each flank. The front parapet was prepared for infantry defence. Beneath the rampart are four ammunition stores with vertical lifts to handling rooms on the rampart above. To the rear of the main rampart at the gorge of the fort is a series of eight casemated barrack rooms serving as accommodation for the garrison, ammunition stores and general stores. All are constructed of concrete with an earth covering. At each end of the casemates is a tunnel to the ammunition stores. The casemates formed a longitudinal parados protecting the ramparts from reverse fire. The main entrance to the fort was over the rolling bridge at the centre of the casemates. The ditch surrounding the fort was intended to be dry.

== The ditch ==
The ditch is lined with concrete on both the scarp and counterscarp faces. It has on both faces a slight batter of three degrees from the vertical. The depth varies from 25 ft. to 30 ft. maximum and the width at the base also varies, being wider on the rear (long north east to south west) face and at its narrowest on the southern and northern flanks. It is 15 ft. wide. There are no caponiers or counterscarp galleries in the ditch, the only known major British Defence work to adopt a purely passive defence posture.

There is much evidence of the 1907 siege works in this ditch, three of the counter-mine shafts still survive, now mostly covered up with debris and rubbish (post 1962). Near the RSJ which spans the moat are seen five massive cracks and more repair work, again from the siege trials of 1907, but this time, the hole in the base of the ditch was not dug by the defenders but was the result of a failed "camoflet" or "petard". Accounts vary as to the title of the device used, but it was a type of tunnel driven from the attacker's side along the length of the moat to here and exploded. The first left the now mostly back-filled crater but at the second attempt blew a section of the wall outwards causing the damage still to be seen.

After the sale of Fort Luton to Kent County Council the ditch fell into rapid disuse and became an illegal dump for all manner of refuse. A great pile of debris has been allowed to build up beneath and to either side of the drawbridge and beneath the RSJ. The disuse of the ditch has also caused much growth of vegetation.

== The fort in use ==
From 1914 to 1919 the fort was used as a Transit Barracks for troops en route to Europe. From 1920 till 1933 it was used as a store. In 1938 conversion of the fort to a Gun Operations Room (GOR) began. In August 1939 it opened as GOR for the 27th. AA Brigade (Thames and Medway South) Gun Defended Area. Brigadier C.W. Bayne-Jardin D.S.C. M.C. was in command until relieved circa 1942, after which other officers of the same rank continued in command until December 1945.

From 1945/6 to 1961 the fort was used by Army Cadet Force and T.A. Summer camps. In 1961 or 1962 it was sold to Kent County Council (D100 procedure) for educational uses, but the KCC just wanted the land to build the nearby Fort Luton Boys Secondary School, and the fort was abandoned. In 1990 it was bought by a private individual who ran the site as a model museum and visitor attraction with tea shop. In 2001 the fort closed and has since been taken into private ownership and is being restored. The fort has statutory Scheduled monument status.

Fort Luton has been under new ownership since 2012; after 3 years it was decided that it should become a community interest company.
