= Siborne =

Siborne is a surname. Notable people with the surname include:

- Herbert Taylor Siborne (1826–1902), British Army officer in the Royal Engineers and military historian
- William Siborne (1797–1849), British officer and military historian, father of Herbert
