= Cockham Wood Fort =

- Hoo St Werburgh, Kent, England
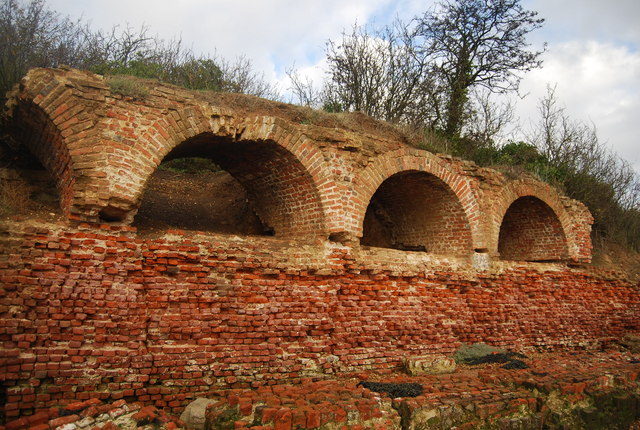
- Part of the surviving brickwork of the fort

Site information
- Type: Artillery fort
- Owner: Medway Ports
- Condition: Ruins

Location
- Coordinates: 51°24′43″N 0°33′04″E

Site history
- Built: 1669
- Built by: Bernard de Gomme
- Materials: Brick and earthworks
- Events: Never used

Scheduled monument
- Official name: Cockham Wood Fort
- Reference no.: 1003362

Cockham Wood Fort was constructed in 1669 on the north bank of the River Medway in Kent in south-east England.

In conjunction with Fort Gillingham it took on the role of defending Chatham Dockyard from seaborne attack, a role which had been performed by Upnor Castle for the previous hundred years. Built in 1669 by Sir Bernard de Gomme as a direct result of the Dutch raid on Chatham Dockyard in 1667. It was constructed with a brick base supporting an upper tier of earthworks. As built it had 21 guns on the lower tier and 20 on the upper tier.

The fort was abandoned around 1818 after several decades of gradual dilapidation. Some of its structure is still standing, the most obvious part being the brickwork of the lower battery which is a prominent feature on the shoreline of the River Medway.

A scheduled monument, it is on the Heritage at Risk Register.
