= Hoo Fort =

Disused military installation in Kent, England

- Rochester, Kent, England
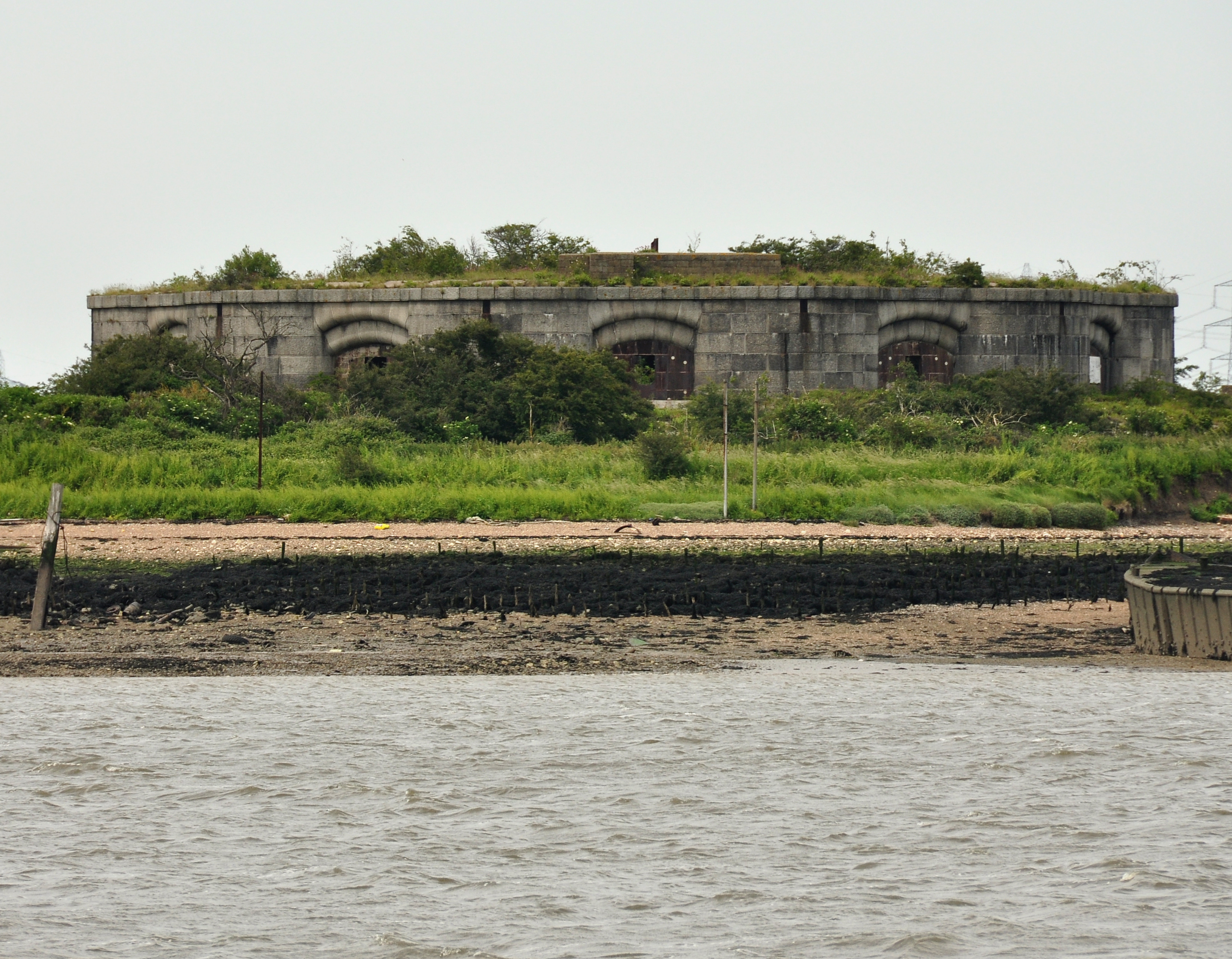
- Hoo Fort in the River Medway

Site information
- Owner: Medway Ports
- Condition: Intact

Location
- Coordinates: 51°24′12″N 00°34′53″E

Site history
- Built: 19th century
- Built by: Captain Siborne, R.E.,
- Materials: Concrete skirts and brickwork
- Events: Never used

Scheduled monument
- Official name: Hoo Fort
- Designated: 1 November 1963
- Reference no.: 1019643

Hoo Fort is a nineteenth-century military installation on the River Medway in Kent, England, that formed part of the defences of Chatham Naval Dockyard. Hoo Fort, like Fort Darnet 1 km (0.6 mi) downstream, was built on the recommendations of the 1859 Royal Commission. It is located on Hoo Island covering Pinup Reach, the inner navigable channel of the River Medway. Hoo Island sits to the south of the Hoo Peninsula and is within the parish of Hoo, Kent. The fort can be viewed from along the Saxon Shore Way, accessible from Vicarage Lane in Hoo.

== History ==
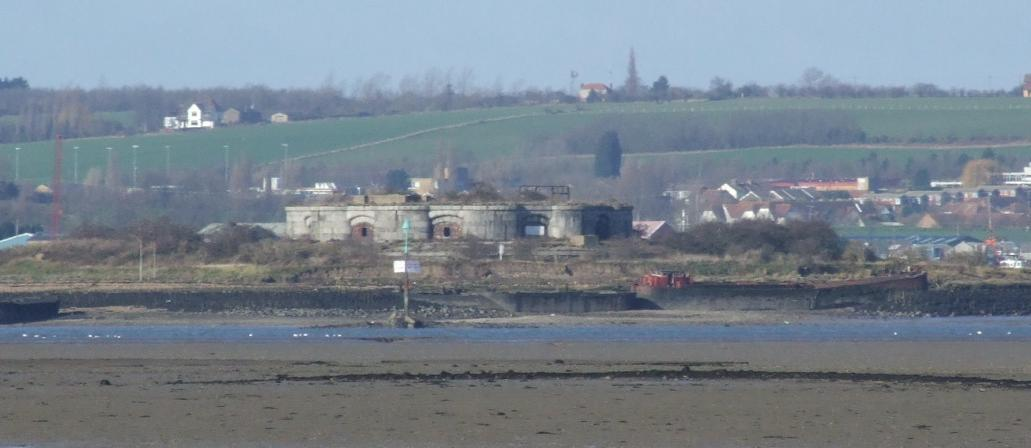
Hoo Fort with Hoo behind

Originally designed for two tiers of guns mounted in a circle, with a boom strung between Hoo Fort and Fort Darnet, there were many problems with subsidence, and after extensive cost overruns the forts were completed in 1871 with a single tier of eleven 9-inch rifled muzzle-loading guns, and no boom. Each gun was mounted in an individual casemate with heavily armoured firing port.

The forts were decommissioned before the First World War. In the Second World War, the fort was used as an observation post, with platforms and pillboxes built on top. The fort is still in fair condition. It is a Scheduled Monument and is owned by Medway Ports.

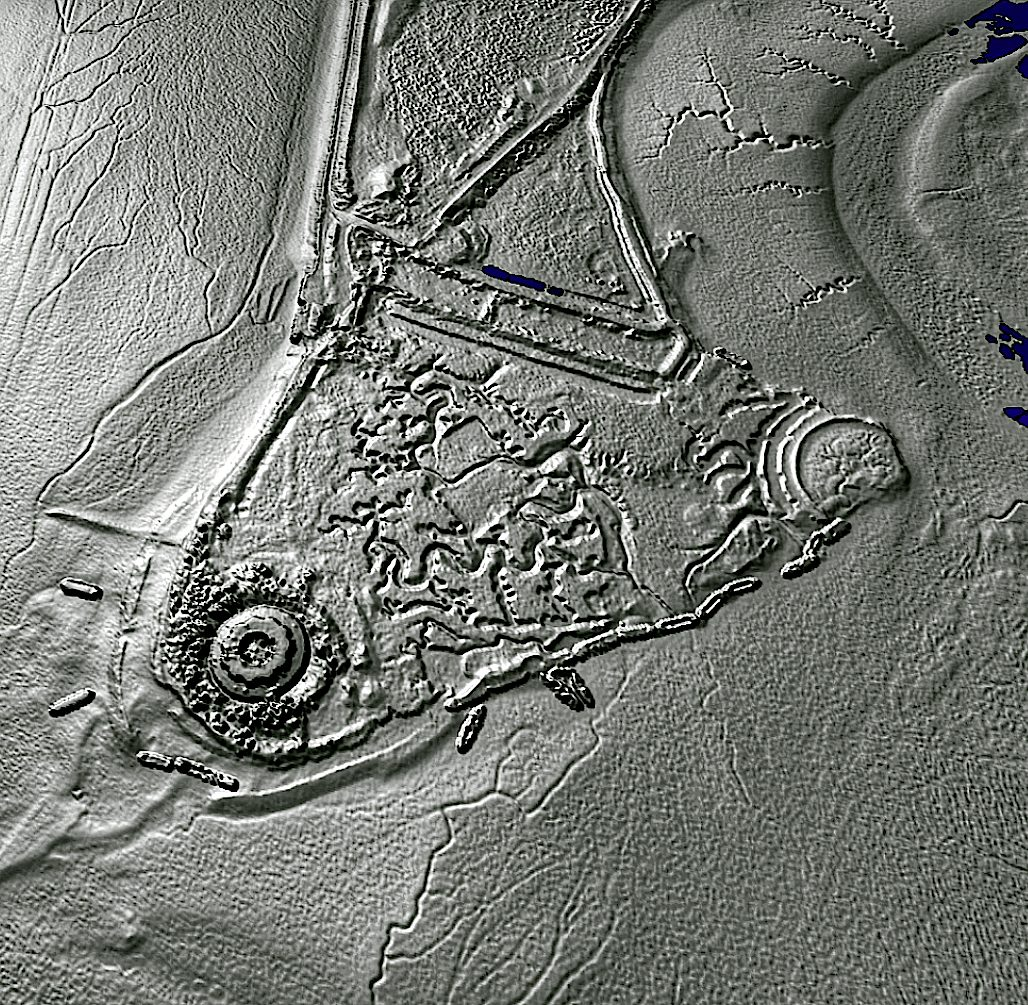
A lidar view of the fort and earthworks.
