= Fort Gillingham =

Coordinates: 51.397°N 00.552°E

Fort Gillingham, also known as Gillingham Fort, was constructed in 1669 on the south bank of the River Medway in Kent, England.

In conjunction with Cockham Wood Fort it took on the role of defending Chatham Dockyard from seaborne attack, a role which had been performed by Upnor Castle for the previous hundred years.

Fort Gillingham was demolished long ago, but its ramparts and ditches are clearly shown on the 1866 Ordnace Survey map with the site identified as a coastguard station. The site of Fort Gillingham is now known as Gillingham Pier.
