= Windmill Hill, Kent =

Area of Gravesend, Kent, England

Coordinates: 51.434989°N 0.371518°E

Windmill Hill
- Location within Kent
- District: Gravesham
- Shire county: Kent
- Region: South East
- Country: England
- Sovereign state: United Kingdom
- Post town: Gravesend
- Postcode district: DA12
- Dialling code: 01474
- Police: Kent
- Fire: Kent
- Ambulance: South East Coast
- UK Parliament: Gravesham

Windmill Hill is an area of Gravesend, Kent. It is named for its erstwhile windmills, offers extensive views across the Thames, and was a popular spot for Victorian visitors to the town, because of the Camera obscura installed in the old mill and for its tea gardens and other amusements.

The hill was the site of a beacon in 1377, which was instituted by Richard II, and still in use 200 years later at the time of the Spanish Armada, although the hill was then known as "Rouge Hill". A modern beacon was erected and lit, by then-Mayor Peter Hart, during 1988, for the 400th anniversary of the defeat of the Spanish Armada.

During the reign of Elizabeth I the first windmill was placed on top the highest point in Gravesend, 179 ft (55 m) above the high water mark of the river. One mill burnt down in 1763, but was replaced the following year and was demolished, having become derelict, in 1894 - the last surviving windmill on the hill. The adjacent public house was destroyed by fire during Mafeking Night celebrations in 1900.

In August 1606 King James, Anne of Denmark, her brother Christian IV of Denmark, and Prince Henry came to Upnor Castle. They had dinner aboard the Elizabeth Jonas. After dinner they took coaches to Windmill Hill to watch naval cannon salutes.

During World War I a German airship passed over Windmill Hill and dropped bombs on it. Today there are three markers indicating where these bombs struck.

Windmill Hill is one of Gravesham's 24 conservation areas. The 'Windmill Hill Association', Gravesham Borough Council looks after matters related to the area and holds regular meetings to discuss local issues.
