= Royal Commission on the Defence of the United Kingdom =

Government committee formed in 1859

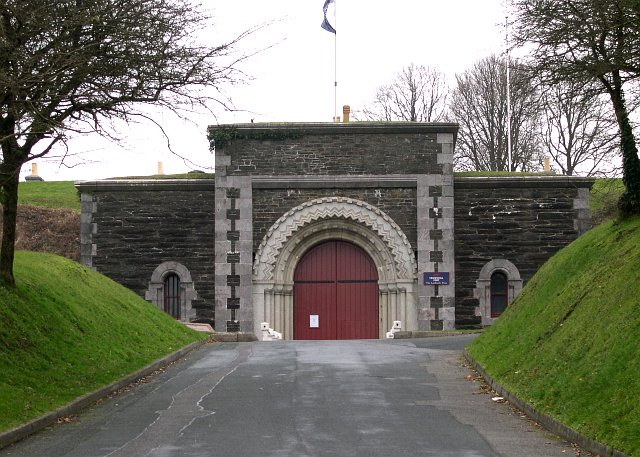
The entrance to Crownhill Fort in Plymouth; one of the fortifications recommended by the 1859 Royal Commission.

The Royal Commission on the Defence of the United Kingdom was a committee formed in 1859 to enquire into the ability of the United Kingdom to defend itself against an attempted invasion by a foreign power, and to advise the British Government on the remedial action required. The appointment of the Commission had been prompted by public concern about the growing military and naval power of the French Empire and was instigated by the Prime Minister, Henry Temple, 3rd Viscount Palmerston, who came to be closely associated with the project. In the following year, the Commission's report recommended a huge programme of fortification to defend the country's arsenals and naval bases. Many of the recommendations were acted upon; however, the great expense, the length of time taken to complete the various works and their perceived usefulness were all subjects of critical political, press and public debate.

== Background ==
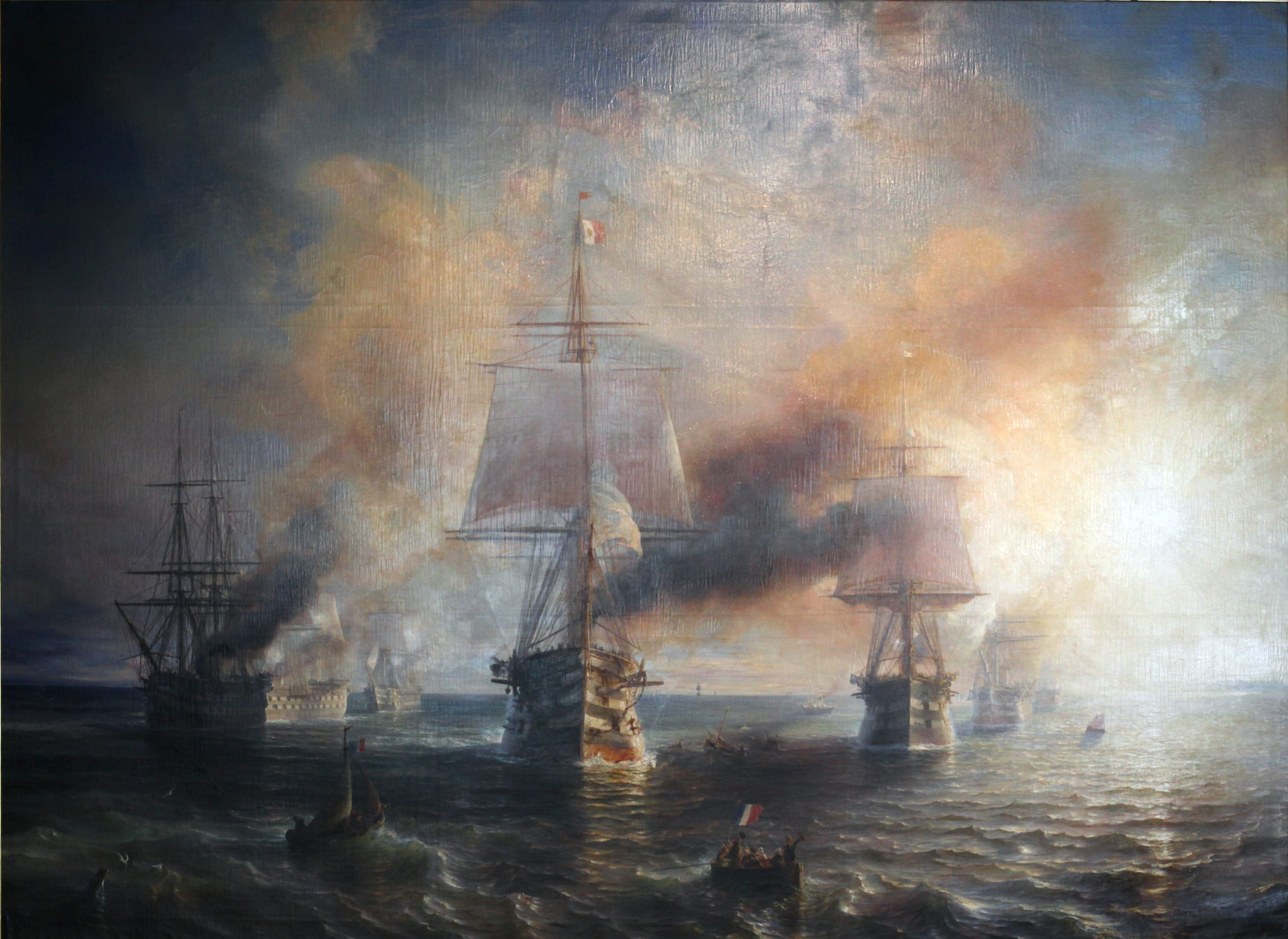
The French fleet leaving Cherbourg under steam and sail in 1858; the growth of the French Navy was a cause of grave concern in the United Kingdom.

In the late 1850s, there were serious concerns that France might attempt to invade the United Kingdom. The recent period had seen great improvements in gunnery (with Rifled Muzzle Loader (RML) and Rifled Breech Loader (RBL) designs) and the widespread introduction of steam propulsion in ships. In 1858, France began a programme to increase their fleet to have 150 steamships, four of which would be ironclads, the first of which, La Gloire, superior to anything in the British inventory, was launched in 1859. Belatedly, the British response was the iron-hulled HMS Warrior, but several obsolete wooden ships of the line were building at the same time. When Palmerston returned to power in 1859, public concern over this naval arms race, combined with Napoleon III's aggressive intervention in the Second Italian War of Independence, allowed him to act on his conviction that Britain's coastal defences were inadequate to prevent invasion if the Royal Navy was lured elsewhere.

== The Royal Commission ==
=== The Commissioners ===
The Commission consisted of six eminent naval and military officers, plus a civilian architect:

- Major-General Sir Henry David Jones CB (Chairman)
- Major-General Duncan Alexander Cameron
- Rear Admiral George Augustus Eliot
- Major-General Sir Frederick Abbott, Indian Army
- Captain Astley Cooper Key, Royal Navy
- Lieutenant-Colonel John Henry Lefroy, Royal Artillery
- James Fergusson Esquire

The Secretary of the Commission was Major William Jervois of the Royal Engineers, a progressive military engineer who held the post of Assistant Inspector-General of Fortifications. Although not appointed as a Commissioner, Jervois seems to have had considerable influence on the conduct of the Commission. Amongst the Commissioners themselves, Cooper Key was an expert in the latest advances in naval gunnery, while Lefroy was an experienced and knowledgeable artillery officer who had been one of the founders of the Royal Artillery Institution. Fergusson was an expert in the history of eastern architecture, but had also published books entitled; An Essay on a Proposed New System of Fortification: with Hints for its Application to our National Defences (1849), The Peril of Portsmouth; or, French Fleets and English Forts (1852) and Portsmouth Protected: a Sequel to the Peril of Portsmouth (1856).

The Commissioners
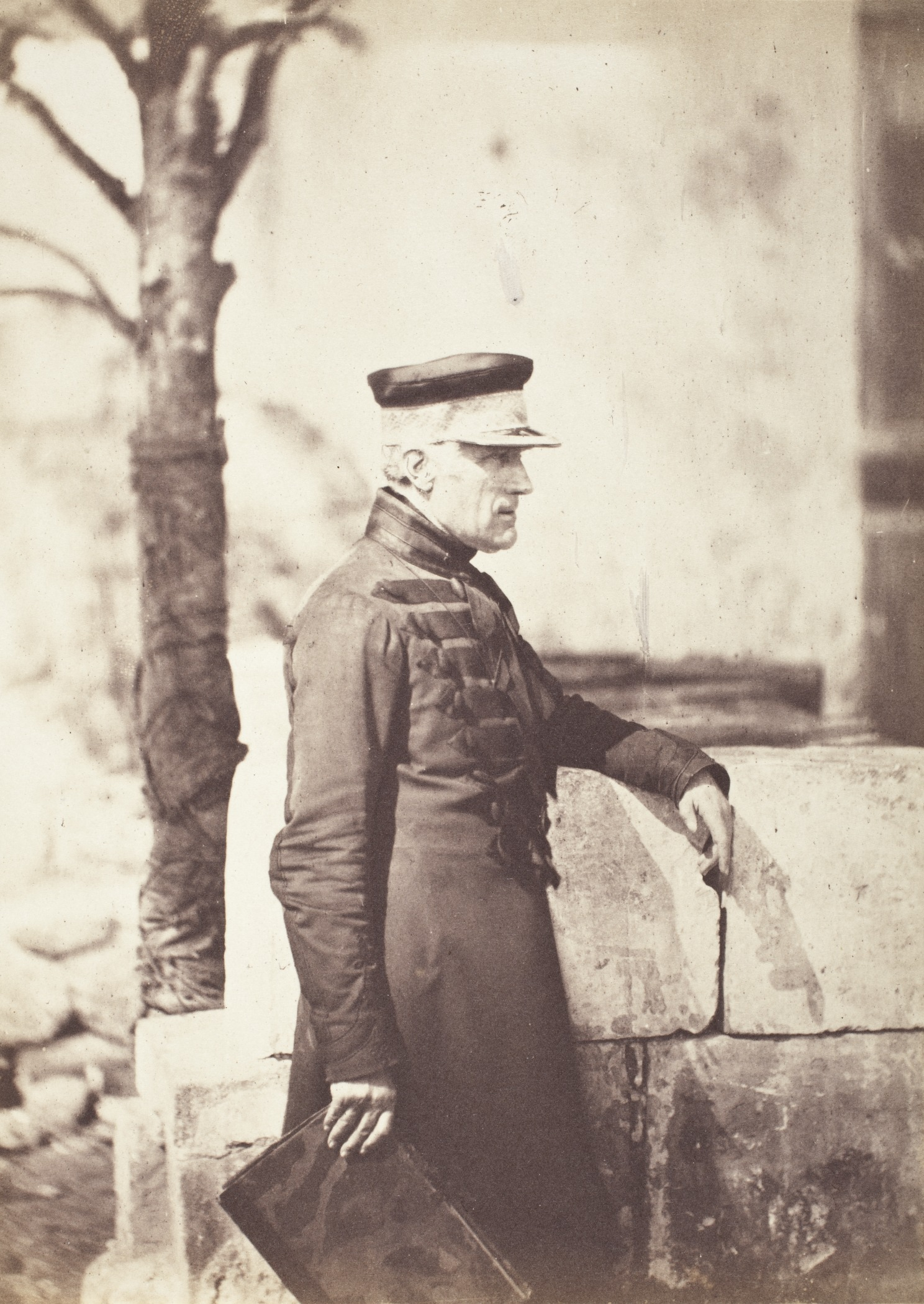
Major-General Sir Henry David Jones

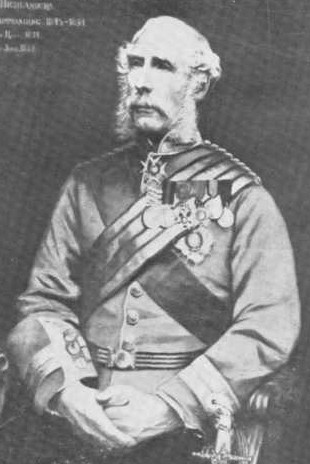
Major-General Duncan Alexander Cameron

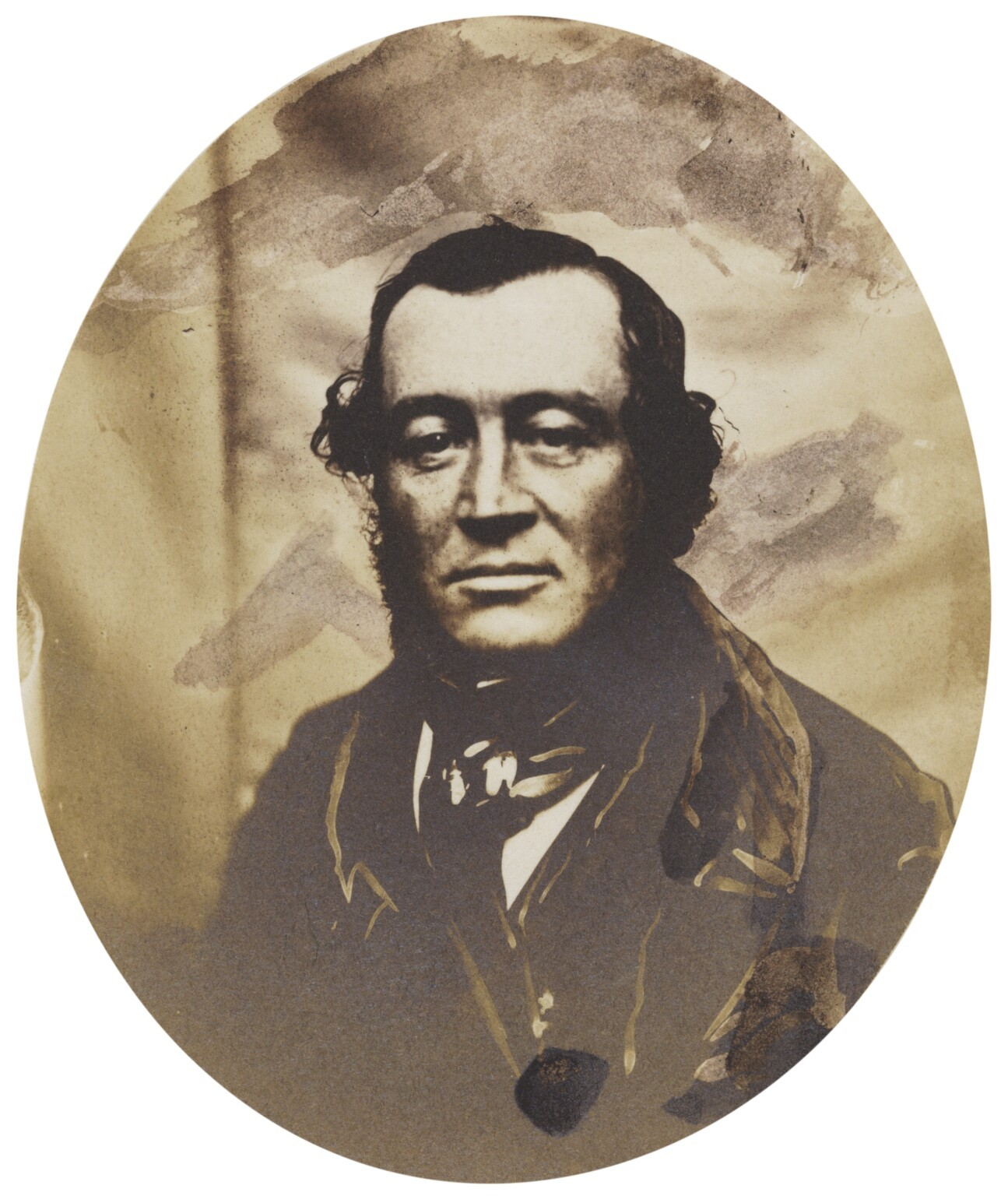
Rear Admiral George Augustus Eliot

Major-General Sir Frederick Abbott

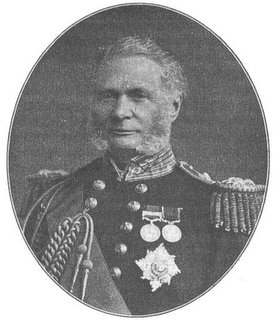
Captain Astley Cooper Key

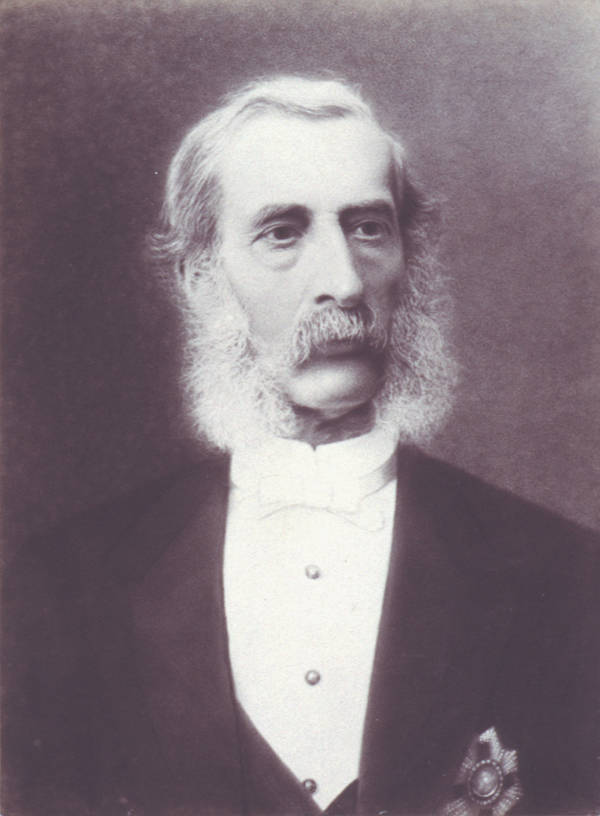
Lieutenant-Colonel John Henry Lefroy

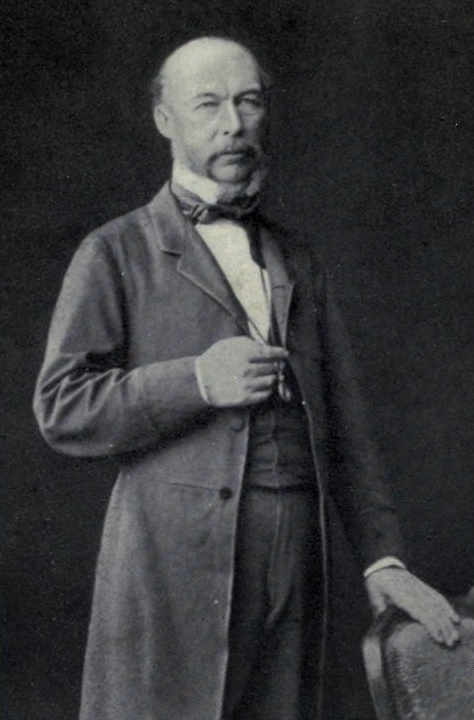
James Fergusson Esquire

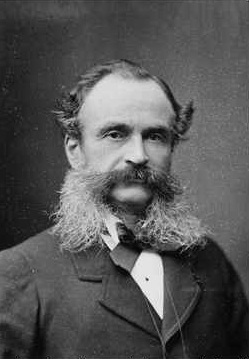
Major William Jervois (Secretary)

=== Terms of reference ===
Formulated by Lord Palmerston and the Secretary of State for War, Sidney Herbert, the Commission's brief was as follows:

Inquiries may be made by Our Commissioners into the condition and sufficiency of the Fortifications existing for the Defence of Our United Kingdom, and examination had into all Works at present in progress for the improvement thereof, and consideration given to the most effective means of rendering the same complete, especially to all such Works of Defence as are intended for the protection of Our Royal Dockyards, in case of any hostile attack being made by foreign enemies, both by sea and land.

An attached memorandum directed the attention of the Commissioners to the works already under construction at Portsmouth and the Isle of Wight, Plymouth, Portland, Pembroke and Chatham; they were further asked to consider how the Royal Arsenal at Woolwich might best be defended.

=== Investigations ===
Starting on 3 November 1859, the first phase of the Commission's work was a series of interviews with technical experts and senior military and naval officers. One specialist was Captain Cowper Phipps Coles, the hero of the Siege of Taganrog and an expert in the bombardment of fortifications from the sea. He was so enraged by the numerous questions posed by the Commissioners that he was twice asked to leave the room so that he could recover his composure. Perhaps because of this, the Commission failed to enquire about Coles's pioneering design for a revolving gun turret, which he had patented in that year. Another interviewee was General John Fox Burgoyne, who had conducted the Siege of Sevastopol and was the current Inspector-General of Fortifications. Burgoyne's opinion was that the defence of the dockyard at Portsmouth was of primary importance and it could be protected from bombardment by the fortification and garrisoning of the Isle of Wight and also Portsdown Hill, the ridge which overlooks Portsmouth from the north. Burgoyne also believed that the coast between Portsmouth and the Thames was vulnerable to invasion and that every small harbour there needed to be fortified. Sir William Armstrong, the artillery designer and manufacturer, was questioned at length about the current capabilities of modern rifled artillery and likely future developments. Armstrong's opinion was that his latest guns would be able to defeat some features of current fortification, such as the Carnot wall, but that the maximum range of artillery would be unlikely to exceed 5 miles (8.0 kilometres) in the future.

The Commission also conducted a series of visits to the sites in question, before convening to produce a report of their findings. Perhaps because the Commissioners were all respected experts in their own fields, they were apparently able to work together amicably.

== The Report ==
The Report of the Commissioners was published on 7 February 1860. The Commissioners concluded that the fleet, standing army and volunteer forces, even combined, did not provide sufficient defence against invasion. Further, that the coastline which they considered to be at risk, the 700 miles (1,100 km) from the Humber to Penzance, could not feasibly be completely fortified and therefore recommended that "the fortifications of this country should be confined to those points... whose possession would give him sure bases for operations". A detailed plan and costing was produced for each location which required defences, including forts which were already under construction, resulting in a massive programme. The total expenditure projected for the purchase of land and construction costs (including some funds that had already been agreed but not yet provided) was as follows:

Area	Total cost £
Plymouth	3,020,000
Portsmouth	2,800,000
Pembroke	765,000
Portland	630,000
Thames	180,000
Medway	450,000
Chatham	1,350,000
Woolwich	700,000
Dover	335,000
Cork	120.000
Total	10,350,000

Also included in the costings were the total of £500,000 for the armament of these works (a sum that was to prove hopelessly optimistic) and £1,000,000 for the construction of floating batteries, giving a grand total of £11,850,000. The Commissioners further suggested that a force of volunteer artillerymen be raised to man the guns in the new works.

However the commission left “extended commerce” and consequently the food supply of Great Britain, to the protection of the fleet. This topic was then addressed by the Royal Commission Appointed to Enquire into the Defence of British Possessions and Commerce Abroad.

== Implementation ==
The government, although broadly in agreement with the report, thought that it was too ambitious to be accepted by Parliament in its original form, and therefore set about reducing the number of planned works while attempting to retain the objectives of the scheme for each locality. Planned forts that were not proceeded with included fifteen at Plymouth, ten at Pembroke, six at Portsmouth and four at Chatham; the floating batteries were also dispensed with, resulting in a total saving of £3,930,000. Palmerston finally laid the Fortification Bill before an astonished House of Commons on 23 July 1860. Opposition came from those who believed that there was no threat from France and those who believed that greater security should be achieved by further spending on the navy. The chief opponents were the Radical Richard Cobden and his ally, William Ewart Gladstone, then Chancellor of the Exchequer, who between them had recently concluded the Cobden–Chevalier Treaty, a Free Trade agreement with France. The bill was accepted as the Fortifications (Provisions for Expenses) Act 1860, providing an initial sum of two million pounds and later payments financed by loans to a total of nine million.

By the time the fortifications were completed in the 1880s it was clear that the French had not seriously planned to invade. The Franco-Prussian War of 1870–71 removed the threat and the forts became known as Palmerston's Follies. As a key purpose of fortification is deterrent, this judgement was harsh, but with the rapid development of warship design during the period, the time taken to plan and implement the works would always have caused problems with ensuring that the defences were capable of defeating a French attack force.

== The works ==
The types of fortification constructed as a result of the Royal Commission fell into two main categories; coastal batteries and land forts.

=== Coastal batteries ===
The main purpose of the coastal batteries was to provide protected positions for heavy coastal artillery which would be able to engage enemy warships and troopships. In some places, for instance high on a cliff, the guns could be mounted in a barbette or open gun pit. However, where the batteries were close to the shoreline and could be engaged directly by enemy gunfire, each heavy gun was mounted in a casemate, a vaulted chamber with embrasure for the gun to fire through which was pierced through an armoured shield. Since being mounted in an enclosed space limited the traverse of the gun, casemates were arranged in a long curved row so that the guns of the battery could follow the progress of a passing enemy ship, each weapon engaging it in turn. The rear of the battery was closed either by a simple wall pierced with loopholes, or by a more elaborate defensible building which doubled as a barracks for the garrison. The intention of these rearward defences was that they would be strong enough to prevent the battery being taken by enemy infantry but weak enough to be demolished should the battery fall into enemy hands. In two forts, Fort Darnet and Fort Hoo, the casemates formed a complete circle; other circular works were built as sea forts with foundations on the sea-bed and entirely surrounded by water. A number of the Royal Commission coastal works were upgrades of existing fortifications, such as the 16th century Pendennis Castle at Falmouth.

=== Land forts ===
The landward fortifications were intended to prevent an enemy force who may have landed at an undefended beach from marching overland and assaulting a dockyard from the rear, or simply bombarding it. These forts were built in the new polygonal style without the traditional bastions and generally sited so as to form a "ring fortress", so that each fort could support its neighbour with artillery fire. Construction of some landward forts at Portsmouth and Plymouth had already begun in the 1850s and work on the ring fortress at Chatham was not started until 1875, resulting in very different designs as military theories changed over the decades.

=== Gallery ===
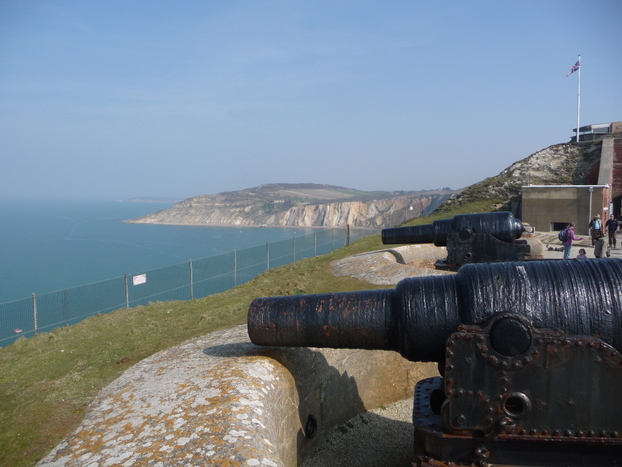
The Needles Old Battery on the Isle of Wight, showing RML 9 inch guns mounted in barbettes.

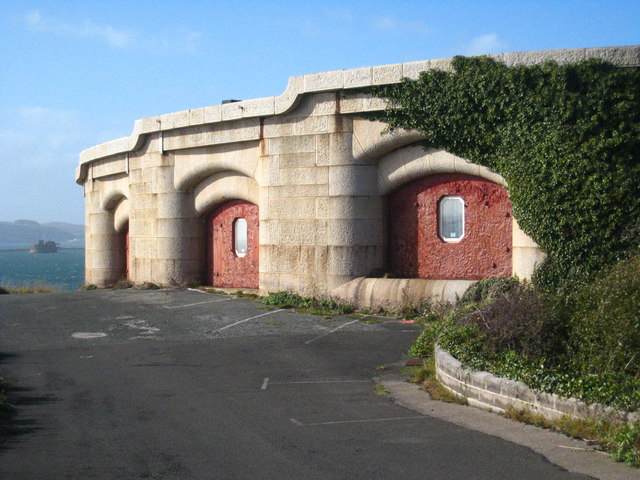
Fort Bovisand overlooking Plymouth Sound, showing the forward face of the casemates, each having an iron shield pierced by an embrasure for the gun to fire through.

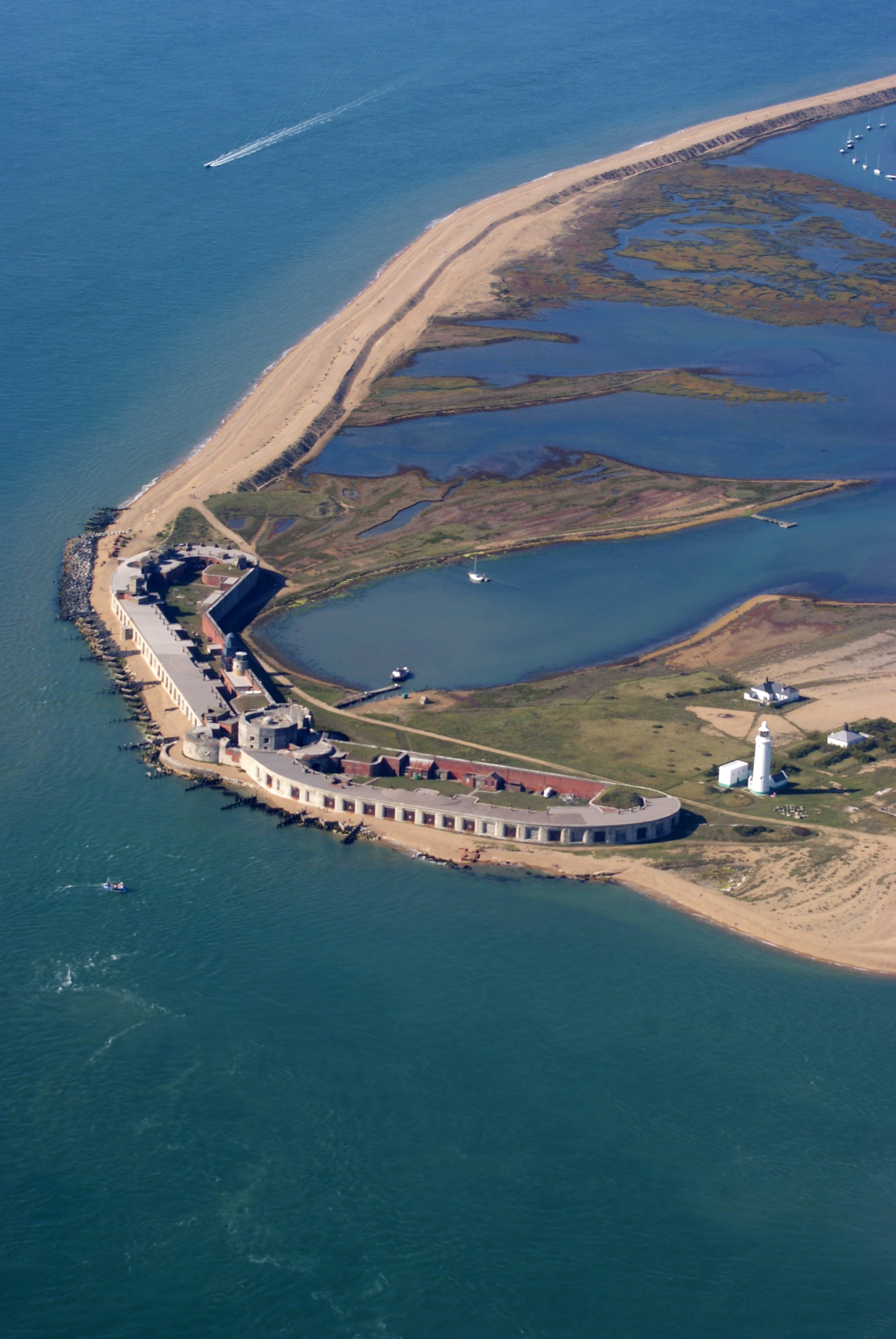
The curved casemated battery at Hurst Castle on the Solent, which was attached to a 16th-century fortification originally built by King Henry VIII.

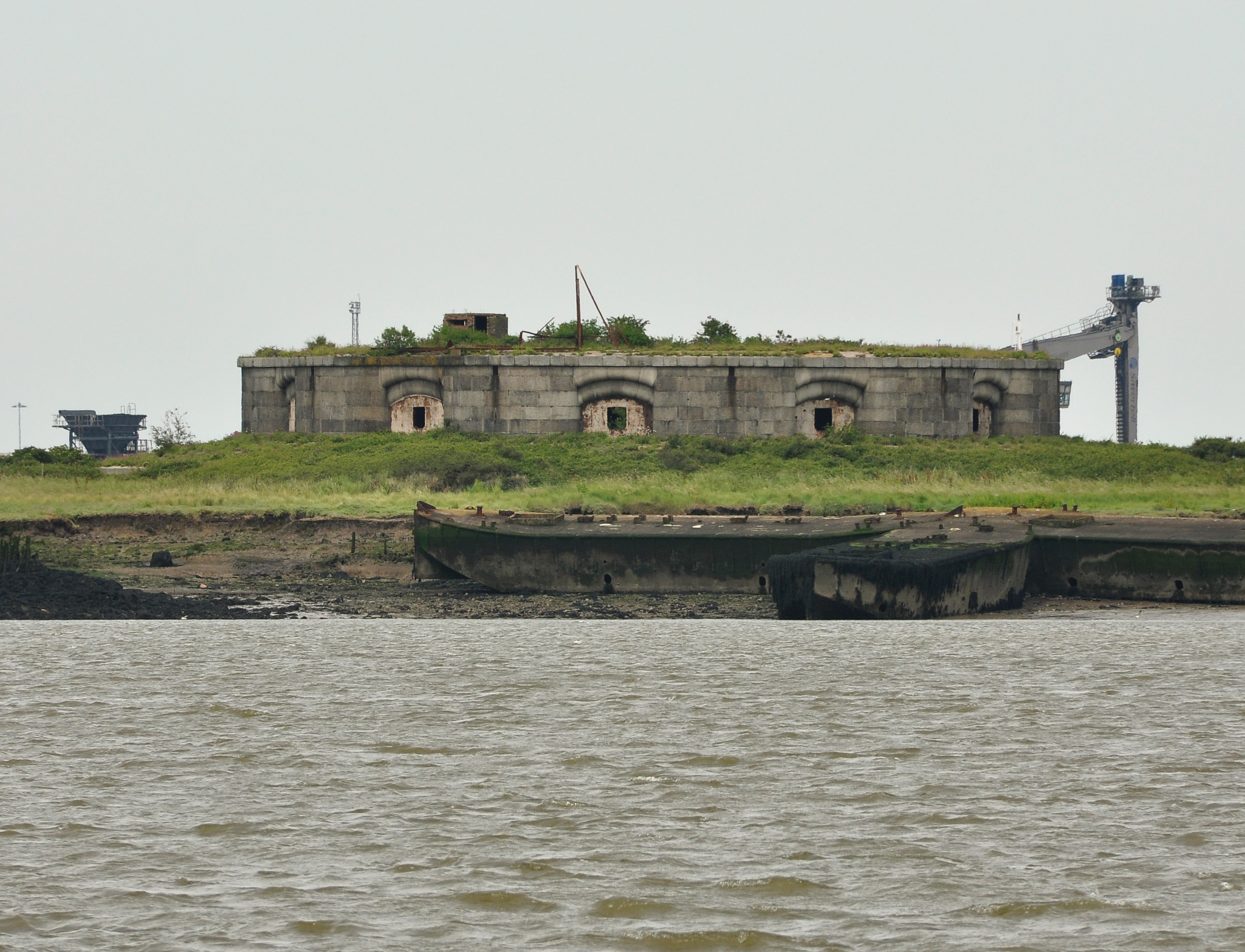
At Fort Darnet on the Medway, the casemates form a complete circle.

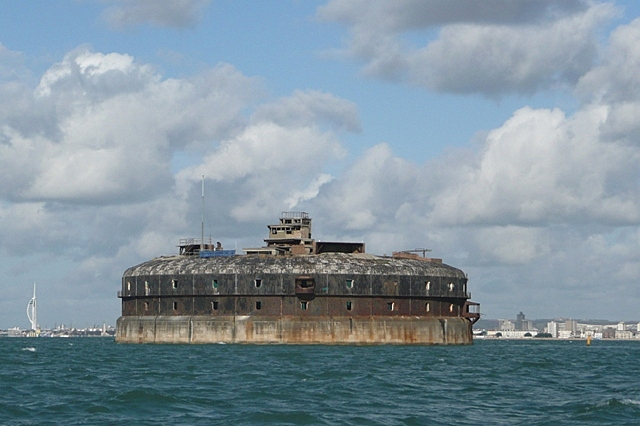
Horse Sand Fort is built on the sea bed of the Solent.

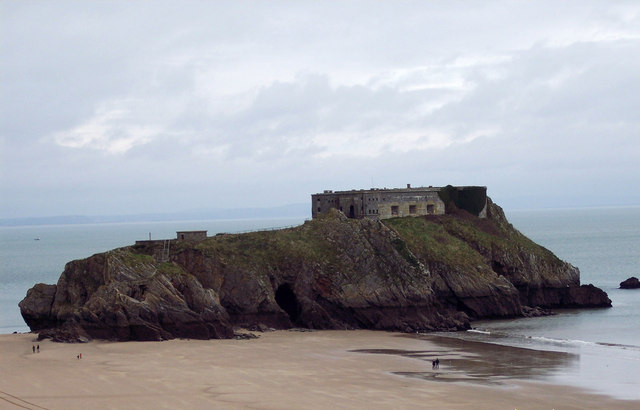
St Catherine's Fort which defended the beach at Tenby, a possible landing site for an attack on Milford Haven.

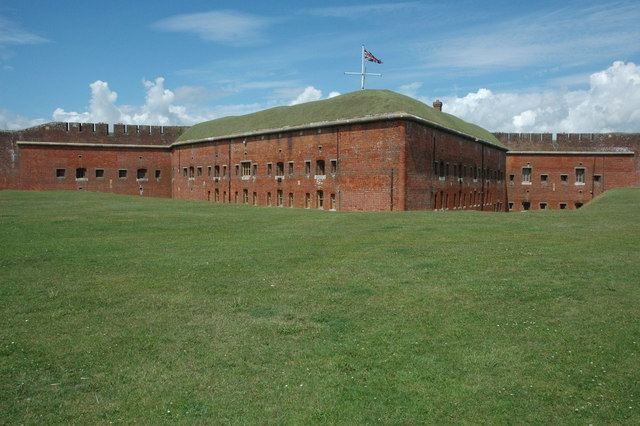
The rearward defences of Fort Nelson, one of a chain of forts along Portsdown Hill to the north of Portsmouth.

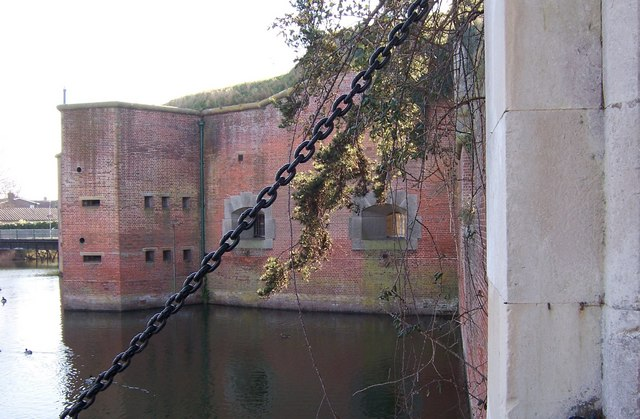
Fort Brockhurst at Gosport is protected by a moat.

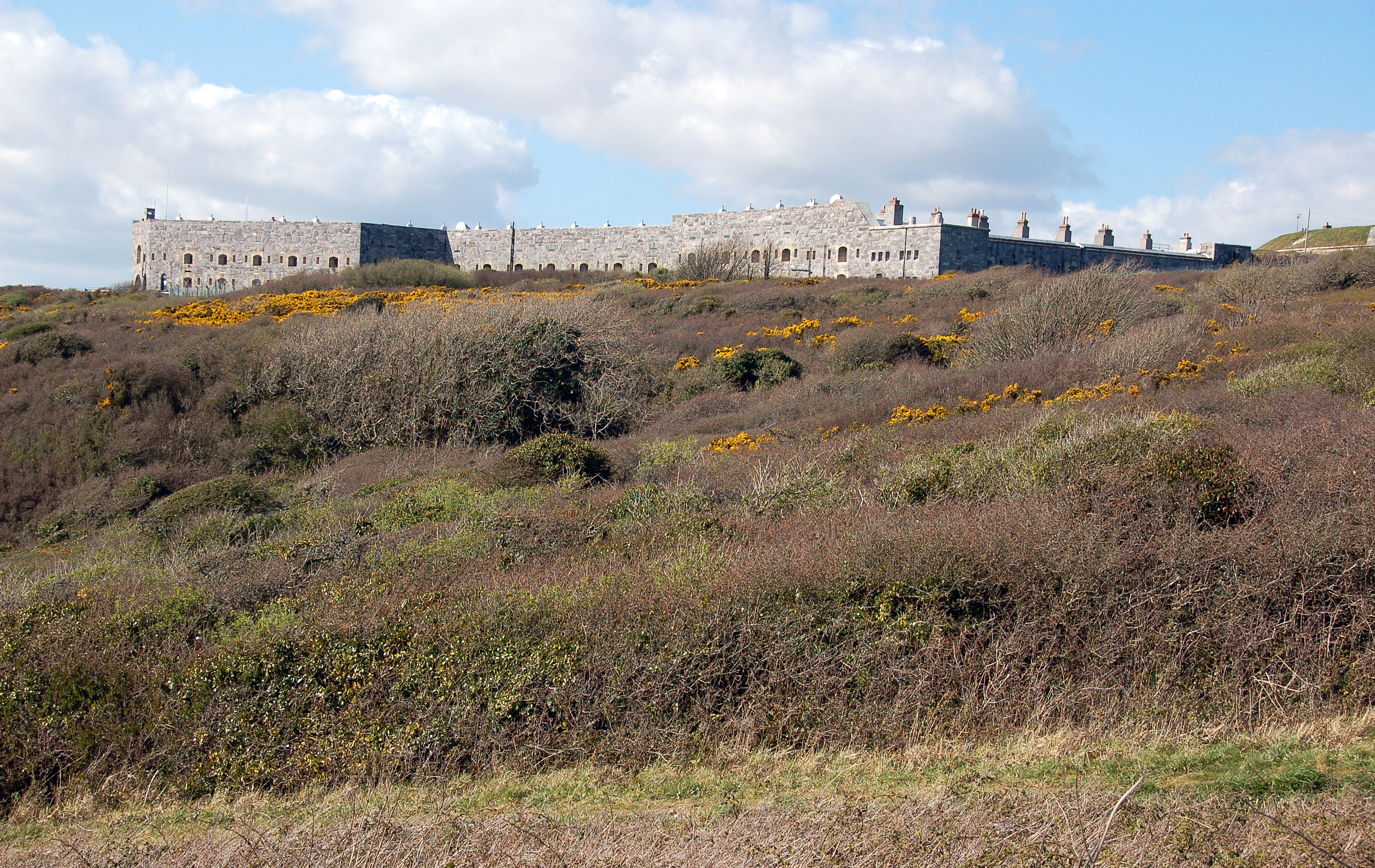
Fort Tregantle, which defended Plymouth from overland attack from the west.

== See also ==
- Palmerston Forts
- London Defence Positions
- Royal Commission

== Bibliography ==
- Crick, Timothy (2012) Ramparts of Empire: The Fortications of Sir William Jervois, Royal Engineer 1821-1897, University of Exeter Press, ISBN 978-1-905816-04-0
- Haas, J. M. (1994). A Management Odyssey: The Royal Dockyards, 1714-1914. Lanham, Maryland: University Press of America. ISBN 978-0819194619.
- Hogg, Ian V (1974), Coast Defences of England and Wales, 1856-1956, David & Charles, ISBN 978-0-7153635-3-9
- Moore, David (1990), Fort Brockhurst and the Gomer-Elson Forts (Solent Papers; No. 6.), David Moore, ISBN 978-0-9513234-1-0
- Dyer, Nick (2003), British Fortification in the late 19th and early 20th Centuries, The Palmerston Forts Society, ISBN 978-0-9523634-6-0
- Stone, Glyn; Otte, Thomas G. (2008). Anglo-French Relations since the Late Eighteenth Century. London: Routledge. ISBN 978-0415395786.
