= Fort Darnet =

Disused military installation in Kent, England

- Medway, Kent, England
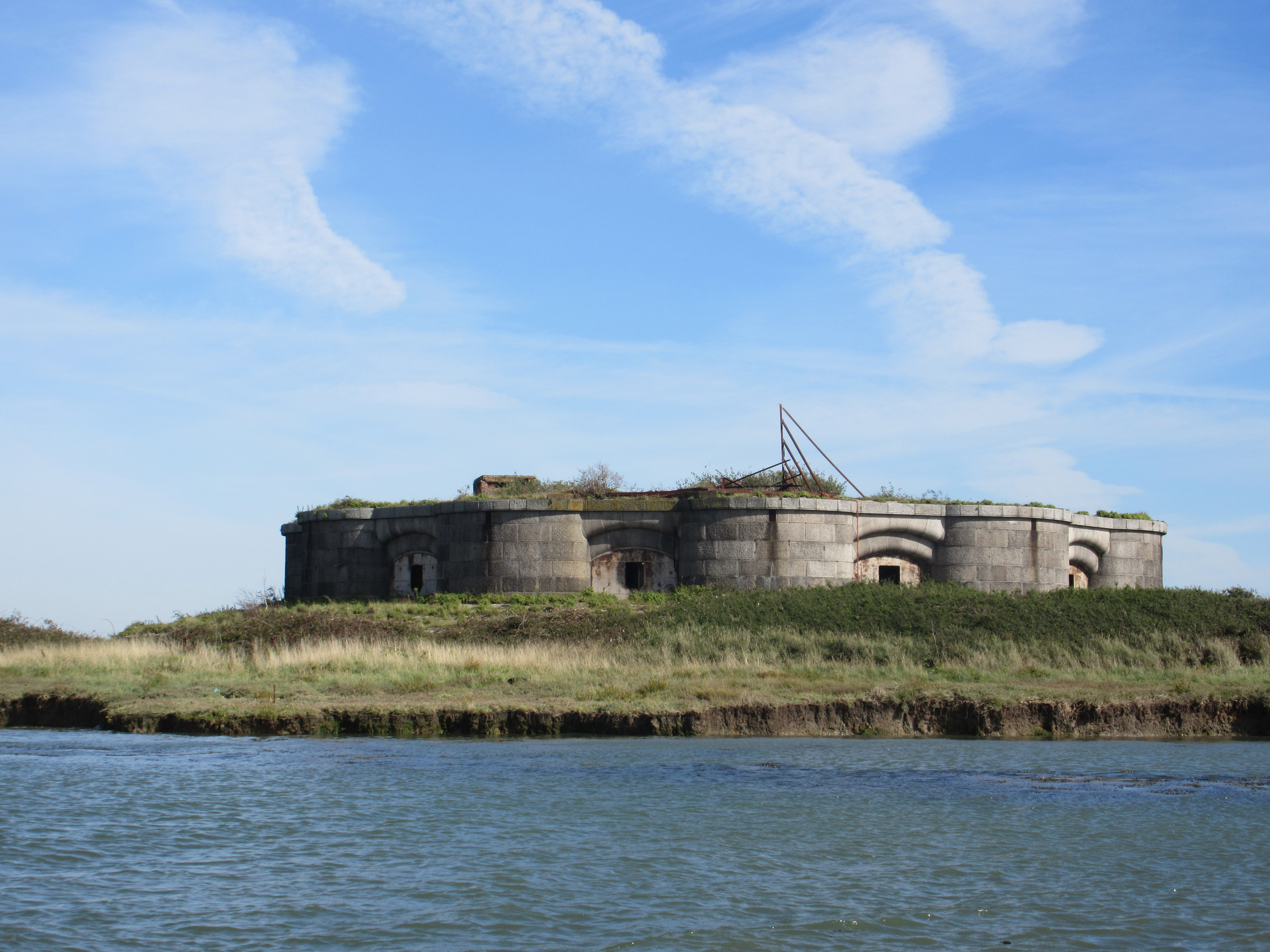
- Fort Darnet in the River Medway

Site information
- Type: Palmerston Fort
- Owner: Medway Ports
- Condition: Intact

Location
- Coordinates: 51°24′25″N 0°35′47″E

Site history
- Built: 19th century
- Built by: Captain Siborne, R.E.,
- Materials: Concrete skirts and brickwork
- Events: Never used

Scheduled monument
- Official name: Fort Darnet, Darnet Ness
- Designated: 1 November 1963
- Reference no.: 1019642

Fort Darnet is a nineteenth-century military installation on the River Medway in Kent, England, that formed part of the defences of Chatham Naval Dockyard. Fort Darnet, like its twin Hoo Fort 1 km (0.6 mi) upstream, was built on the recommendations of the 1859 Royal Commission on an island covering Pinup Reach, the inner navigable channel of the River Medway.

The installation was built between 1870 and 1872. The two forts were originally designed with each having two tiers of guns mounted in a circle, with a boom strung between the forts, but there were many problems with subsidence. After extensive cost overruns they were completed in 1872 with one tier of eleven guns: a mixture of eight 9-inch and three 7-inch rifled muzzle-loaders. The boom was not implemented, though there were plans to mine the channel if thought needed. Fort Darnet was originally designed for a garrison of up to 100 men.

The fort was used for gunnery practice until one of the guns cracked in its casemate, as reported in The Chatham Observer on 25 January 1879.

The forts were never used in anger, and were decommissioned before the First World War. In the Second World War the fort was used as an observation post, with platforms and pillboxes built on top. The fort is still in fair condition, however the magazine level is flooded. The island can be freely visited by boat, though the landing is muddy.

Up to the 1980s, the island was used for picnicking and other leisure pursuits.

It is scheduled under the Ancient Monuments and Archaeological Areas Act 1979.

- References

== Bibliography ==
- Crowdy, R, Medway's Island Forts (1979)
- Gulvin, K R, The Medway Forts (1976), 18-19
- Smith, V T C, Strategic Study of Kent's Defences - Fort Darnet (1999)
