= William Siborne =

British officer and military historian

William Siborne (or Sibourne or Siborn; 15 October 1797 – 9 January 1849) was a British Army officer and military historian whose most notable work was a history of the Waterloo Campaign.

== Early life ==
William Siborne was the son of Benjamin Siborne, a captain in the 9th (East Norfolk) regiment, born in Greenwich circa 1771. His father had been wounded at the Battle of Nivelle in the Peninsular War. William Siborne graduated from the Royal Military College, Sandhurst in 1814, having been commissioned as an ensign in the same regiment (renamed the 9th Regiment of Foot in 1782) on 9 September 1813, before it joined the 2nd battalion at Canterbury, then Chatham, and finally Sheerness in 1815.

== Military career ==
In August 1815, he was sent to France to join the Duke of Wellington's army of occupation, doing duty in the Camp of Boulogne, near Paris. He obtained the rank of lieutenant in November 1815, but was put on half pay from March 1817, when his regiment was reduced to one battalion. In September 1820, he undertook a secret mission in Germany on behalf of the Treasury.

Two years later, he published his first book, Instructions for Civil and Military Surveyors in Topographical Plan-drawing.

In July 1824, he married Helen Aitken, daughter of a Scottish banker and colonel of the militia. They subsequently had a son and daughter.

On 11 November 1824, he was gazetted to the 47th (Lancashire) regiment, this being backdated to November 1815, and went on leave in Europe.

In March 1826, he was appointed as Assistant Military Secretary to the Commander-in-Chief, Ireland (first Lieutenant-General Sir George Murray, followed by Sir John Byng, then Sir Richard Hussey Vivian and finally Sir Edward Blakeney), holding this post until 1843.

In 1827, he published his second book, A Practical Treatise on Topographical Surveying and Drawing, which was dedicated to his commander-in-chief Sir George Murray.

== History of Waterloo ==
Early in 1830, Rowland Hill, 1st Viscount Hill, then Commander-in-Chief of the British Army, commissioned Siborne to construct a model of the Battle of Waterloo. Siborne carried out extensive research, writing to officers in the Allied forces present at the battle to obtain information on the positions of the troops at the crisis of the battle at 7 p.m. His attempts to get the same information from the Ministry of War in Paris were politely ignored, while the Prince of Orange supplied him with information on the Netherlands forces.

The replies to the circular he sent out and the subsequent correspondence amount to the largest single collection of primary source material on the subject ever assembled. The British Museum purchased the collection after his death and it is now in the British Library. He spent eight months at the farm of La Haye-Sainte surveying the entire battlefield.

The actual model took until 1838 to complete, partly because Siborne still had his main military duties to fulfill. Progress was interrupted in 1833, by the new ministry's refusal to allocate new funds. Siborne financed the model himself from then onwards.

Military historian Peter Hofschröer claimed in his controversial book that during the construction of the Large Model, Siborne earned the enmity of the Duke of Wellington, as Siborne's research called into question parts of the Duke's version of events at Waterloo. This, claims Hofschröer, led to Siborne's attempts to get the government to honour its obligation to him being thwarted, his attempts to obtain his captaincy being obstructed and a smear campaign being undertaken against him.

The final total cost was around £3,000, which Siborne had considerable difficulty in recovering, as the exhibitor of its first public display in London cheated him of much of his share of the revenues. Siborne also built a smaller model of a portion of the battlefield on a larger scale. The main model was purchased by the Royal United Service Institution after his death, and is now in the Conflict In Europe gallery at the National Army Museum, London. The smaller model is on display at the Royal Armouries Museum.

Siborne made use of the considerable amount of material he assembled to write his third book, a history of the Waterloo Campaign. It was first published in 1844 and remains in print As of 2017. Its alleged lack of objectivity was and still is a source of debate.

On 31 January 1840, he purchased an unattached captaincy, although this was on half-pay. As he was exhausted by his efforts, his friends in the army obtained a sinecure for him as Secretary and Adjutant of the Royal Military Asylum at Chelsea, a post which he took up in November 1843 and remained in until his death. He is buried at Brompton Cemetery. His second son, Henry Taylor Siborne, later published a selection of the letters in his collection.

== Bibliography ==
- 1822: Instructions for Civil and Military Surveyors in Topographical Plan-Drawing
- 1827: A Practical Treatise on Topographical Surveying and Drawing, dedicated to his c-in-c George Murray
- 1840s: Guide to Captain Siborne's New Waterloo Model
- 1844: two-volume History of the War in France and Belgium in 1815 (with folio atlas), still in print in the 4th edition
