= English ship Elizabeth Jonas =

First large English galleon

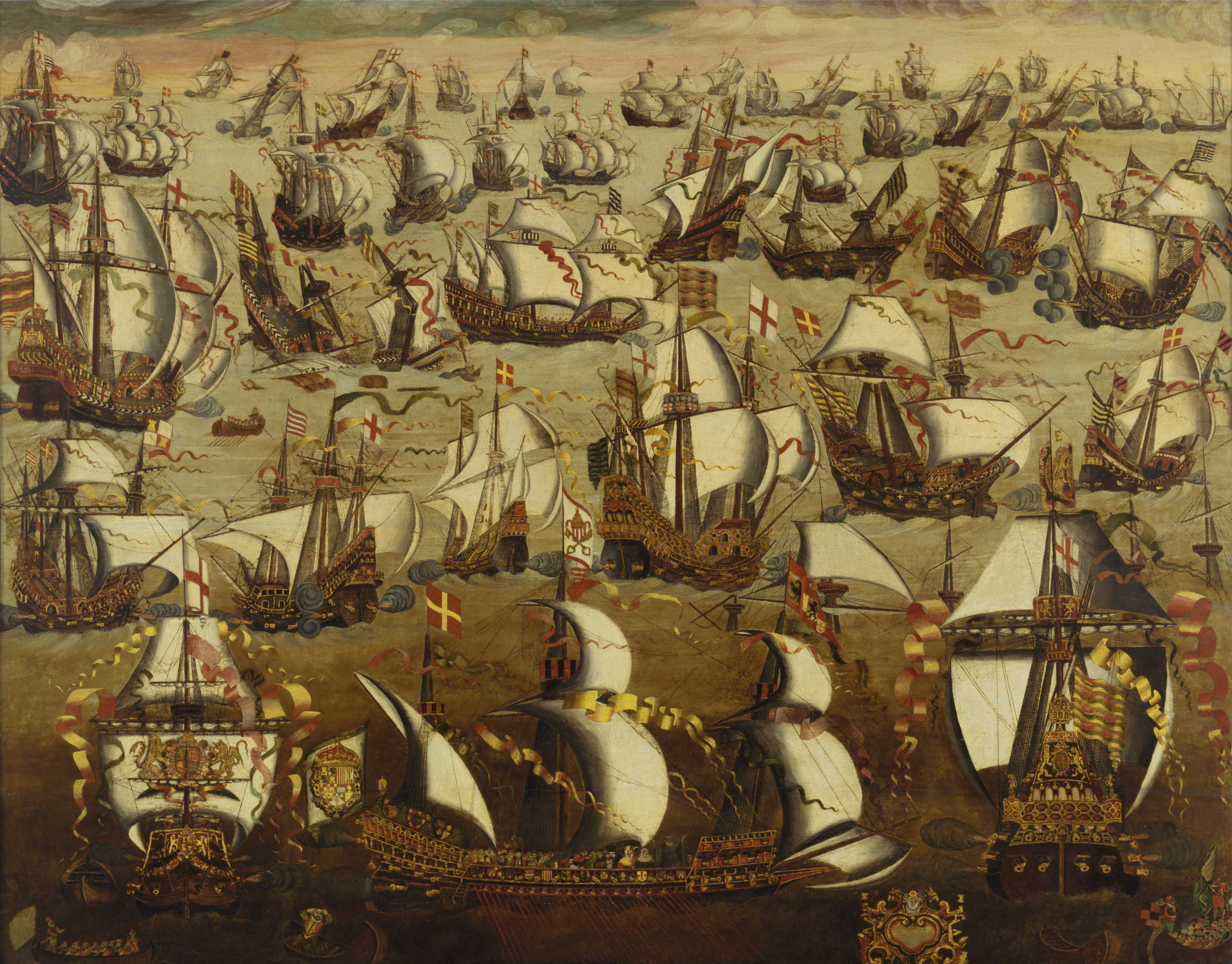
- English ships fight the Spanish Armada, 1588

History

England
- Name: Elizabeth Jonas
- Builder: Peter Pett, Woolwich Dockyard
- Laid down: 1557
- Launched: 3 July 1559
- Out of service: 1585-1586; 1597-1598
- Fate: Rebuilt 1597-98. Condemned and sold, 1618

General characteristics as built 1557-59
- Tons burthen: 740 bm
- Sail plan: Full-rigged ship
- Armament: 42 guns

General characteristics as rebuilt from 1598
- Class & type: 55-gun Royal Ship
- Tons burthen: 684 bm
- Length: 100 ft (30 m) (keel)
- Beam: 38 ft (12 m)
- Depth of hold: 18 ft (5.5 m)
- Sail plan: Full-rigged ship
- Complement: 500 (340 sailors, 40 gunners, 120 soldiers)
- Armament: 3 cannons; 2 demi-cannons; 18 culverins; 13 demi-culverins; 19 sakers; 3 veuglaires

The Elizabeth Jonas of 1559 was the first large English galleon, built in Woolwich Dockyard from 1557 and launched in July 1559.

== Construction ==
The vessel's keel was laid in 1557, for a ship of 800 tons burthen to replace Henry VIII's prestige warship, the Henry Grace à Dieu (More commonly known as the "Great Harry"), which had been destroyed by fire in 1553. Originally intended to be named Edward after Edward VI, she was renamed when Elizabeth I came to the throne. Launched in 1559, accounts of the time relate that she was named Elizabeth Jonas by Elizabeth herself, "in remembrance of being preserved from Her enemies, no less miraculously than the phrophet Jonas (Jonah) was preserved from the belly of a whale". She was a square-rigged galleon of four masts, including two lateen-rigged mizzenmasts.

== Naval service ==
Elizabeth Jonas served effectively under the command of Sir Robert Southwell during the battle of the Spanish Armada in 1588. In 1597-98 she was rebuilt as a razee galleon. Phineas Pett mentions that Elizabeth planned to attend the 1598 launch at Woolwich but did not.

On 5 August 1606, held as a day of thanksgiving for the king's deliverance from the Gowrie Conspiracy at Perth in 1600, James VI and I, Anne of Denmark, their son Henry, and her brother Christian IV of Denmark had dinner aboard the Elizabeth Jonas at Upnor Castle near Rochester, and then were rowed to Chatham. The Elizabeth Jonas was joined to the White Bear by a bridge, and a third ship moored in between served as the kitchen. Phineas Pett was involved in preparing the Elizabeth Jonas and the White Bear for this entertainment.

In the early seventeenth century she was listed as one of the Navy's Ships Royal, denoting the largest and most prestigious vessels in the fleet. A 1618 commission of enquiry confirmed the designation, but found that years of inactivity had left her entirely unserviceable. Later that year she was broken up for scrap at Woolwich Dockyard.
