= Herbert Taylor Siborne =

British Army general

Major-General Herbert Taylor Siborne
- Born: 18 October 1826
- Died: 16 May 1902 (aged 75); Rapallo, Northern Italy
- Military career
- Allegiance: Great Britain
- Branch: Royal Engineers
- Service years: 1846–82
- Rank: Major-General
- Conflicts: Kaffir War (1851-53)
- Other work: British member of the European Commission of the Danube 1873–1881.

Major-General Herbert Taylor Siborne (18 October 1826 – 16 May 1902) was a British Army officer in the Royal Engineers and a military historian.

Siborne was born in 1826, the second son of the officer and historian Captain William Siborne. He joined the Royal Engineers in 1846, and served in the Kaffir War 1851–53, and also in the expedition against the Basutos in December 1852, when he had charge of the pontoons by which the troops crossed the Orange and Caledon rivers. He was present at the action of the Berea, and was mentioned in General Orders. In 1855 he was promoted to captain, and in 1877 to colonel. He retired from the service with the rank of Major-General in 1882.

It is thought he designed many of the Forts in the River Medway, including Fort Darnet.

He was the British member of the European Commission of the Danube 1873–1881.

Siborne edited and published in 1891 some of the letters his father had received in his research for his Battle of Waterloo model as Waterloo letters: a selection from original and hitherto unpublished letters bearing on the operations of the 16th, 17th, and 18 June 1815, by officers who served in the campaign.

A second volume Letters from the Battle of Waterloo was published in 2005 by Gareth Glover.

He married a daughter of Mr. Julian A. Watson, of Constantinople.

Siborne died at Rapallo, on 16 May 1902.
