= Medway Ports =

Part of Peel Ports

Coordinates: 51°26′48″N 0°44′40″E

- Company type: Subsidiary
- Industry: Ports and logistics
- Predecessor: Medway Port Authority
- Founded: October 1969 (as Medway Port Authority)
- Headquarters: Medway, Kent, England
- Area served: River Medway and The Swale
- Services: Port operations, harbour authority, pilotage, conservancy
- Parent: Peel Ports (since 2005)
- Divisions: Port of Sheerness, Chatham Docks

Medway Ports is a port operator in Kent, England, incorporating the Port of Sheerness and Chatham Docks. It forms part of Peel Ports, the second-largest port group in the United Kingdom.

Medway Ports, incorporating the Port of Sheerness and Chatham Docks is part of Peel Ports, the second largest port group in the United Kingdom. The ports authority is also responsible for the harbour, pilotage and conservancy matters for 27.3 nautical miles (50.6 km) of the River Medway, from the Medway Buoy to Allington Lock at Maidstone, and the Swale.

Medway Port Authority was created in October 1969 to bring together a number of independent companies took over the running of the Sheerness site for commercial use, once the Royal Navy had vacated in 1960. Chatham Dockyard closed in 1984 with the site being divided into three sections with Medway Ports Authority taking control of one section as Chatham Docks.

Medway Ports Authority was privatised, as Medway Ports, through a £37 million management buyout in 1992, before being sold again in 1993 to Mersey Docks and Harbour Company for £104 million, just 18 months later.

On 22 September 2005, the MDHC was acquired by Peel Ports, part of the property and transport group Peel Group.

== Regeneration ==
Part of the Chatham Docks site is being regenerated as "Chatham Waters", a mixed-use development scheme promoted by Peel.
