= Opinion polling in United Kingdom constituencies (2010–2015) =

Prior to the 2015 general election, various polling organisations conducted opinion polling in specific constituencies. The results of publicised opinion polling for individual constituencies are detailed in this article. However, most opinion polling covers Great Britain, where the results are published in this article here.

Opinion polls were conducted gradually from the months after the previous general election held on 6 May 2010, and increased in frequency before the general election which took place on 7 May 2015. Though most opinion polls published are for general election voting intention, some polls shown are for voting intention in separate by-elections.

Polls of individual constituencies are expensive compared to national polling and were previously an infrequent practice in the UK. However, a large number of individual constituency polls were carried out in this period, most commissioned from independent polling providers by Michael Ashcroft, a Conservative peer and sponsor. In addition to polls listed in this article, other polling of constituencies has been carried out in private, often by political parties.

Given the expense of polling individual constituencies, constituencies are usually only polled if they are of some particular interest, e.g. they are thought to be marginal or facing an impending by-election. The constituencies polled are not necessarily representative of a national average swing. Under the first-past-the-post electoral system true marginal seats are, by definition, decisive as to the election outcome.

== Constituency polls ==
=== England ===
==== Amber Valley ====
Date(s) conducted	Pollster	Client	Sample size	Con	Lab	LD	UKIP	Grn	Others	Lead
7 May 2015	2015 general election		–	44.0%	34.8%	3.0%	15.9%	2.4%	–	9.2
3–12 Jul 2014	Ashcroft	N/A	1,000	34%	35%	4%	23%	3%	2%	1
14–20 Apr 2014	Ashcroft	N/A	1,000	29%	41%	6%	20%	2%	2%	12
6 May 2010	2010 general election		–	38.6%	37.4%	14.4%	2.0%	–	7.6% BNP 7.0% OMRLP 0.6%	1.2

==== Bedford ====
Date(s) conducted	Pollster	Client	Sample size	Con	Lab	LD	UKIP	Grn	Others	Lead
7 May 2015	2015 general election		–	42.6%	40.2%	4.2%	9.6%	3.1%	0.3%	2.4
23–30 Jul 2014	Ashcroft	N/A	1,000	28%	38%	14%	15%	3%	2%	10
6 May 2010	2010 general election		–	38.9%	35.9%	19.9%	2.5%	0.9%	2.0%	3.0

==== Bermondsey and Old Southwark ====
Date(s) conducted	Pollster	Client	Sample size	LD	Lab	Con	BNP	Grn	UKIP	Others	Lead
7 May 2015	2015 general election		–	34.3%	43.1%	11.8%	–	3.9%	6.3%	0.5%	8.7
3–13 Sep 2014	Ashcroft	N/A	1,000	36%	35%	14%	–	5%	9%	2%	1
6 May 2010	2010 general election		–	48.4%	29.2%	17.1%	3.1%	1.6%	0.3%	0.3%	19.1

==== Berwick-upon-Tweed ====
Date(s) conducted	Pollster	Client	Sample size	LD	Con	Lab	UKIP	Grn	Others	Lead
7 May 2015	2015 general election		–	28.9%	41.1%	14.9%	11.2%	3.7%	0.2%	12.2
21–28 Aug 2014	Ashcroft	N/A	1,000	30%	33%	16%	17%	3%	1%	3
6 May 2010	2010 general election		–	43.7%	36.7%	13.2%	3.2%	–	3.2%	7

==== Birmingham Edgbaston ====
Date(s) conducted	Pollster	Client	Sample size	Lab	Con	LD	UKIP	Grn	Others	Lead
7 May 2015	2015 general election		–	44.8%	38.3%	2.9%	10.1%	3.3%	3.5%	6.5
31 Jul – 11 Aug 2014	Ashcroft	N/A	1,001	48%	29%	3%	12%	5%	1%	19
12–18 May 2014	Ashcroft	N/A	1,000	44%	33%	5%	13%	4%	1%	11
6 May 2010	2010 general election		–	40.6%	37.6%	15.4%	1.8%	1.1%	3.6%	3.0

==== Birmingham Yardley ====
Date(s) conducted	Pollster	Client	Sample size	LD	Lab	Con	UKIP	Grn	Others	Lead
7 May 2015	2015 general election		–	25.6%	41.6%	14.0%	16.1%	1.7%	1.0%	16.0
27–31 Oct 2014	Ashcroft	N/A	1,000	34%	31%	12%	19%	2%	1%	3
6 May 2010	2010 general election		–	39.6%	32.2%	19.2%	2.9%	–	–	7.3

==== Blackpool North and Cleveleys ====
Date(s) conducted	Pollster	Client	Sample size	Con	Lab	LD	UKIP	Grn	Others	Lead
7 May 2015	2015 general election		–	44.4%	36.0%	2.4%	14.8%	2.3%	0.1%	8.5
30 Mar – 4 Apr 2015	Ashcroft	N/A	1,000	42%	37%	3%	15%	2%	1%	5
13–18 Oct 2014	Ashcroft	N/A	1,000	35%	32%	5%	24%	3%	1%	3
6 May 2010	2010 general election		–	41.8%	36.5%	13.3%	4.1%	–	4.3%	5.3

==== Bognor Regis and Littlehampton ====
Date(s) conducted	Pollster	Client	Sample size	Con	LD	UKIP	Lab	Others	Lead
7 May 2015	2015 general election		–	51.3%	9.0%	21.7%	13.8%	4.1%	29.6
22–24 Nov 2013	Survation	Alan Bown	508	37%	11%	27%	20%	5%	10
6 May 2010	2010 general election		–	51.4%	23.5%	14.0%	6.5%	4.5%	27.9

==== Bolton West ====
Date(s) conducted	Pollster	Client	Sample size	Lab	Con	LD	UKIP	Grn	Others	Lead
7 May 2015	2015 general election		–	39.0%	40.6%	4.0%	15.3%	–	1.1%	1.6
23–31 Jul 2014	Ashcroft	N/A	1,000	40%	27%	8%	21%	2%	2%	13
21–27 Apr 2014	Ashcroft	N/A	1,001	41%	28%	10%	17%	2%	1%	13
6 May 2010	2010 general election		–	38.5%	38.3%	17.2%	4.0%	1.1%	0.8%	0.2

==== Boston and Skegness ====
Date(s) conducted	Pollster	Client	Sample size	Con	Lab	LD	UKIP	BNP	Grn	IFE	Others	Lead
7 May 2015	2015 general election		–	43.8%	16.5%	2.3%	33.8%	0.3%	1.8%	0.7%	0.7%	10.0
26 Jan – 5 Feb 2015	Ashcroft	N/A	1,000	38%	17%	5%	35%	–	3%	–	2%	3
5–9 Sep 2014	Survation	Alan Bown	342	26.2%	20.8%	2.0%	45.5%	1.0%	3.2%	1.0%	0.4%	19.3
6 May 2010	2010 general election		–	49.4%	20.6%	14.8%	9.5%	5.3%	–	–	0.4%	28.8

==== Bradford East ====
Date(s) conducted	Pollster	Client	Sample size	LD	Lab	Con	BNP	UKIP	Grn	Others	Lead
7 May 2015	2015 general election		–	29.3%	46.6%	11.3%	–	9.9%	2.1%	0.5%	17.1
1–21 Jun 2014	Ashcroft	N/A	1,000	23%	45%	12%	–	15%	2%	3%	22
6 May 2010	2010 general election		–	33.7%	32.8%	26.8%	4.6%	–	–	2.0%	0.9

==== Brent Central ====
Date(s) conducted	Pollster	Client	Sample size	LD	Lab	Con	Grn	UKIP	Others	Lead
7 May 2015	2015 general election		–	8.4%	62.1%	20.3%	4.1%	3.9%	1.2%	41.8
11–22 Jun 2014	Ashcroft	N/A	1,001	19%	54%	13%	5%	7%	1%	35
6 May 2010	2010 general election		–	44.2%	41.2%	11.2%	1.5%	–	2%	3.0

==== Brentford and Isleworth ====
Date(s) conducted	Pollster	Client	Sample size	Con	Lab	LD	UKIP	Grn	Others	Lead
7 May 2015	2015 general election		–	42.9%	43.8%	4.0%	5.6%	3.7%	–	0.9
17–26 Sep 2014	Ashcroft	N/A	1,001	32%	45%	10%	7%	4%	1%	13
6 May 2010	2010 general election		–	37.2%	33.6%	23.7%	1.6%	1.5%	2.4%	3.6

==== Brighton Kemptown ====
Date(s) conducted	Pollster	Client	Sample size	Con	Lab	LD	Grn	UKIP	Others	Lead
7 May 2015	2015 general election		–	40.7%	39.2%	3.0%	7.0%	9.8%	0.4%	1.5
11–21 Sep 2014	Ashcroft	N/A	1,000	33%	37%	6%	10%	13%	1%	4
6 May 2010	2010 general election		–	38.0%	34.9%	18.0%	5.5%	3.2%	0.5%	3.1

==== Brighton Pavilion ====
Date(s) conducted	Pollster	Client	Sample size	Grn	Lab	Con	LD	UKIP	Others	Lead
7 May 2015	2015 general election		–	41.8%	27.3%	22.8%	2.8%	5.0%	0.4%	14.6
11–20 Nov 2014	Ashcroft	N/A	1,001	38%	28%	21%	5%	8%	1%	10
5–12 Jun 2014	Ashcroft	N/A	1,000	32%	33%	18%	5%	9%	2%	1
6 May 2010	2010 general election		–	31.3%	28.9%	23.7%	13.8%	1.8%	0.4%	2.4

==== Bristol North West ====
Date(s) conducted	Pollster	Client	Sample size	Con	LD	Lab	UKIP	Grn	Others	Lead
7 May 2015	2015 general election		–	43.9%	6.2%	34.4%	9.4%	5.7%	0.3%	9.5
17–23 Apr 2015	Ashcroft	N/A	1,005	43%	8%	34%	8%	6%	0%	9
6 May 2010	2010 general election		–	38.0%	31.5%	25.9%	2.3%	1.0%	1.3%	6.5

==== Bristol West ====
Date(s) conducted	Pollster	Client	Sample size	LD	Lab	Con	Grn	UKIP	Others	Lead
7 May 2015	2015 general election		–	18.8%	35.7%	15.2%	26.8%	3.0%	0.4%	8.8
17–23 Apr 2015	Ashcroft	N/A	1,001	20%	38%	14%	25%	2%	1%	13
6 May 2010	2010 general election		–	48.0%	27.5%	18.4%	3.8%	1.2%	1.1%	20.5

==== Broxtowe ====
Date(s) conducted	Pollster	Client	Sample size	Con	Lab	LD	BNP	UKIP	Grn	Others	Lead
7 May 2015	2015 general election		–	45.2%	37.2%	4.0%	–	10.6%	2.9%	0.1%	8.0
26 Jun – 4 Jul 2014	Ashcroft	N/A	1,000	30%	39%	7%	1%	18%	4%	1%	9
8–13 Apr 2014	Ashcroft	N/A	1,000	30%	44%	10%	1%	13%	1%	1%	14
6 May 2010	2010 general election		–	39.0%	38.3%	16.9%	2.7%	2.3%	0.8%	–	0.7

==== Burnley ====
Date(s) conducted	Polling organisation/client	Sample size	LD	Lab	Con	UKIP	Green	BNP	Others	Lead	
27–30 Oct 2014	Ashcroft	1,001	23%	38%	11%	25%	2%	1%	1%	Lead	13
6 May 2010	2010 general election	–	35.7%	31.3%	16.6%	2.2%	–	9.0%	5.2%	4.3	

==== Bury North ====
Date(s) conducted	Polling organisation/client	Sample size	Con	Lab	LD	UKIP	Green	Others	Lead	
2–14 Oct 2014	Ashcroft	1,004	32%	41%	5%	20%	2%	1%	Lead	9
6 May 2010	2010 general election	–	40.2%	35.2%	17%	2.9%	–	4.8%	5.0	

==== Camborne and Redruth ====
Date(s) conducted	Polling organisation/client	Sample size	Con	LD	Lab	UKIP	MK	Green	OMRLP	Others	Lead	
24–26 Mar 2015	Ashcroft	1,001	37%	13%	24%	14%	–	8%	–	3%	Lead	13
25 Nov 2014	Survation/University of Exeter	500	30.0%	6.3%	22.4%	33.0%	0.9%	6.9%	0.4%	0.1%	3	
6 May 2010	2010 general election	–	37.6%	37.4%	16.3%	5.1%	1.8%	1.4%	–	0.4%	0.2	

==== Cambridge ====
Date(s) conducted	Polling organisation/client	Sample size	LD	Con	Lab	Green	UKIP	Others	Lead	
24–28 Mar 2015	Ashcroft	1000	40%	17%	31%	9%	3%	–	Lead	9
3–12 Sep 2014	Ashcroft	1000	32%	19%	33%	8%	7%	1%	1	
4–8 Apr 2014	ICM/Lord Oakeshott	500	28%	18%	41%	5%	5%	2%	13	
6 May 2010	2010 general election	–	39.1%	25.6%	24.3%	7.6%	2.4%	1.0%	13.5	

==== Cannock Chase ====
Date(s) conducted	Polling organisation/client	Sample size	Con	Lab	LD	BNP	UKIP	Green	Others	Lead	
16–24 Apr 2015	Ashcroft	1,002	32%	38%	5%	–	21%	3%	1%	Lead	6
22–27 Oct 2014	Ashcroft	1,000	27%	32%	8%	–	30%	2%	1%	2	
6 May 2010	2010 general election	–	40.1%	33.1%	17.0%	4.8%	3.5%	–	1.6%	7.0	

==== Carlisle ====
Date(s) conducted	Polling organisation/client	Sample size	Con	Lab	LD	UKIP	Green	Others	Lead	
11–16 Jul 2014	Ashcroft	1,001	30%	41%	5%	18%	3%	3%	Lead	11
6 May 2010	2010 general election	–	39.3%	37.3%	15.6%	2.3%	1.5%	4.1%	2.0	

==== Carshalton and Wallington ====
Date(s) conducted	Polling organisation/client	Sample size	LD	Con	Lab	UKIP	Green	Others	Lead
29 Oct – 6 Nov 2014	Ashcroft	1,000	43%	23%	12%	17%	3%	1%	20
6 May 2010	2010 general election	–	48.3%	36.8%	8.7%	2.9%	0.8%	2.4%	11.5

==== Castle Point ====
Date(s) conducted	Polling organisation/client	Sample size	Con	Lab	LD	UKIP	Green	Others	Lead	
15–24 Apr 2015	Ashcroft	1,000	41%	12%	2%	36%	3%	5%	Lead	5
26 Jan – 5 Feb 2015	Ashcroft	1,002	37%	16%	3%	36%	2%	6%	1	
6 May 2010	2010 general election	–	44.0%	14.7%	9.4%	–	–	31.9% Spink (Ind) 27.0% BNP 4.9%	17.0	

==== Cheadle ====
Date(s) conducted	Polling organisation/client	Sample size	LD	Con	Lab	UKIP	Green	Others	Lead	
15–22 Aug 2014	Ashcroft	1,000	34%	30%	19%	13%	2%	3%	Lead	4
26 May – 1 Jun 2014	Ashcroft	1,003	32%	29%	21%	15%	2%	1%	3	
6 May 2010	2010 general election	–	47.1%	40.8%	9.4%	2.7%	–	–	6.3	

==== Cheltenham ====
Date(s) conducted	Polling organisation/client	Sample size	LD	Con	Lab	UKIP	Green	Others	Lead	
27 Oct – 1 Nov 2014	Ashcroft	1,000	42%	34%	7%	11%	5%	1%	Lead	8
6 May 2010	2010 general election	–	50.5%	41.2%	5.1%	2.3%	–	0.9%	9.3	

==== Chippenham ====
Date(s) conducted	Polling organisation/client	Sample size	LD	Con	Lab	UKIP	Green	Others	Lead	
14–20 Aug 2014	Ashcroft	1,000	24%	39%	14%	16%	6%	1%	Lead	15
26 May – 1 Jun 2014	Ashcroft	1,000	26%	35%	12%	19%	7%	1%	9	
6 May 2010	2010 general election	–	45.8%	41.0%	6.9%	3.4%	0.9%	2%	4.8	

==== City of Chester ====
Date(s) conducted	Polling organisation/client	Sample size	Con	Lab	LD	UKIP	Green	Others	Lead	
26 Feb – 5 Mar 2015	Ashcroft	1,000	34%	45%	7%	10%	3%	1%	Lead	11
13–18 Oct 2014	Ashcroft	1,000	36%	37%	7%	15%	5%	1%	1	
6 May 2010	2010 general election	–	40.6%	35.1%	19.1%	2.6%	1.1%	1.5%	5.5	

==== Clacton ====
Date(s) conducted	Polling organisation/client	Sample size	Con	Lab	LD	Green	UKIP	Others	Lead	
7 May 2015	2015 general election	–	36.7%	14.4%	1.8%	1.9%	44.4%	–	Lead	7.8
9 Oct 2014	2014 Clacton by-election	–	24.6%	11.2%	1.4%	2.7%	59.7%	1.2%	35.1	
29 Aug – 1 Sep 2014	Ashcroft	1,001	27%	19%	3%	3%	48%	<0.5%	21	
29 Aug – 1 Sep 2014	Ashcroft (By-election polling)	1,001	24%	16%	2%	1%	56%	1%	32	
28–29 Aug 2014	Survation (By-election polling)	700	20%	13%	2%	1%	64%	<0.5%	44	
6 May 2010	2010 general election	–	53.0%	25.0%	12.9%	1.2%	–	7.8%	28.0	

==== Cleethorpes ====
Date(s) conducted	Polling organisation/client	Sample size	Con	Lab	LD	UKIP	Green	Others	Lead	
2–11 Apr 2015	Ashcroft	1,001	38%	36%	6%	15%	3%	1%	Lead	2
6 May 2010	2010 general election	–	42.1%	32.6%	18.2%	7.1%	–	3.9%	9.5	

==== Colchester ====
Date(s) conducted	Polling organisation/client	Sample size	LD	Con	Lab	UKIP	Green	Others	Lead
4–14 Nov 2014	Ashcroft	1,000	36%	22%	17%	18%	6%	1%	14
6 May 2010	2010 general election	–	48.0%	32.9%	12.3%	2.9%	1.5%	2.4%	15.1

==== Colne Valley ====
Date(s) conducted	Polling organisation/client	Sample size	Con	LD	Lab	UKIP	Green	Others	Lead
16–22 Apr 2015	Ashcroft	1,000	37%	8%	35%	11%	6%	2%	2
2–12 Feb 2015	Ashcroft	1,000	33%	9%	34%	13%	9%	1%	1
6 May 2010	2010 general election	–	37.0%	28.2%	26.4%	2.1%	1.6%	4.7%	8.7

==== Corby ====
Date(s) conducted	Polling organisation/client	Sample size	Con	Lab	LD	UKIP	Green	Others	Lead
10–17 Sep 2014	Ashcroft	1,000	30%	40%	5%	21%	2%	2%	10
15 Nov 2012	2012 Corby by-election	–	26.6%	48.4%	5.0%	14.3%	1.1%	4.6%	21.8
6 May 2010	2010 general election	–	42.2%	38.6%	14.5%	–	–	4.7%	3.6

==== Crewe and Nantwich ====
Date(s) conducted	Polling organisation/client	Sample size	Con	Lab	LD	UKIP	Others	Lead	
2–9 Apr 2015	Ashcroft	1,000	38%	41%	4%	13%	1%	Lead	3
22–24 Nov 2013	Survation/Alan Bown	500	33%	46%	6%	11%	5%	13	
6 May 2010	2010 general election	–	45.8%	34.0%	15.0%	2.8%	2.3%	11.8	

==== Croydon Central ====
Date(s) conducted	Polling organisation/client	Sample size	Con	Lab	LD	UKIP	Green	Others	Lead
26–30 Apr 2015	Ashcroft	1,003	44%	40%	2%	10%	3%	0%	4
3–12 Mar 2015	Ashcroft	1,000	37%	41%	3%	13%	5%	1%	4
14–18 Oct 2014	Ashcroft	1,000	33%	39%	4%	19%	4%	1%	6
6 May 2010	2010 general election	–	39.5%	33.5%	13.2%	2.0%	1.2%	10.6%	6.0

==== Derby North ====
Date(s) conducted	Polling organisation/client	Sample size	Lab	Con	LD	UKIP	Green	Others	Lead	
28 May – 4 Jun 2014	Ashcroft	1,000	44%	23%	17%	12%	2%	2%	Lead	21
6 May 2010	2010 general election	–	33%	31.7%	28%	1.8%	–	5.4%	1.3	

==== Dewsbury ====
Date(s) conducted	Polling organisation/client	Sample size	Con	Lab	LD	Green	UKIP	Others	Lead	
15–23 Jul 2014	Ashcroft	1,000	30%	40%	4%	6%	18%	3%	Lead	10
6 May 2010	2010 general election	–	35%	32.2%	16.9%	1.6%	–	14.3%	2.8	

==== Doncaster North ====
Date(s) conducted	Polling organisation/client	Sample size	Lab	Con	LD	BNP	UKIP	Green	Others	Lead	
18–23 Nov 2014	Ashcroft (Note: Michael Ashcroft initially published incorrect results for his 18–23 Nov 2014 poll, erroneously showing only a small Labour lead. The corrected poll results are shown.)	1,000	54%	13%	4%	1%	25%	2%	2%	Lead	29
6 May 2010	2010 general election	–	47.3%	21.0%	14.9%	6.8%	4.3%	–	5.6%	26.3	

==== Dover ====
Date(s) conducted	Polling organisation/client	Sample size	Lab	Con	LD	UKIP	Green	Others	Lead	
2–9 Apr 2015	Ashcroft	1,002	32%	40%	3%	20%	4%	–	Lead	8
6 May 2010	2010 general election	–	33.5%	44%	15.8%	3.5%	–	3.2%	10.5	

==== Dudley North ====
Date(s) conducted	Polling organisation/client	Sample size	Lab	Con	LD	UKIP	Others	Lead
20–27 Nov 2014	Ashcroft	1,001	37%	24%	3%	34%	3%	3
28 Apr – 4 May 2014	Ashcroft	1,000	40%	24%	4%	27%	5%	13
22–24 Nov 2013	Survation	526	45%	25%	2%	23%	5%	20
6 May 2010	2010 general election	–	38.7%	37.0%	10.5%	8.5%	5.3%	1.7

==== Dudley South ====
Date(s) conducted	Polling organisation/client	Sample size	Con	Lab	LD	UKIP	Green	Lead	
7–10 Apr 2015	Ashcroft	1,000	39%	35%	3%	18%	4%	Lead	4
6 May 2010	2010 general election	–	43.1%	33%	15.7%	8.2%	–	10.1	

==== Ealing Central and Acton ====
Date(s) conducted	Polling organisation/client	Sample size	Con	Lab	LD	UKIP	Green	Others	Lead	
1–6 Dec 2014	Ashcroft	1,000	34%	40%	11%	6%	7%	2%	Lead	6
6 May 2010	2010 general election	–	38.0%	30.1%	27.6%	1.6%	1.6%	1.0%	7.9	

==== Eastbourne ====
Date(s) conducted	Polling organisation/client	Sample size	LD	Con	Lab	UKIP	Green	Others	Lead
27 Aug – 5 Sep 2014	Ashcroft	1,000	46%	25%	7%	18%	2%	2%	21
6 May 2010	2010 general election	–	47.3%	40.7%	4.8%	2.5%	–	4.6%	6.6

==== Eastleigh ====
Date(s) conducted	Polling organisation/client	Sample size	LD	Con	Lab	UKIP	Green	Others	Lead	
20–28 Aug 2014	Ashcroft	538	40%	25%	12%	21%	2%	1%	Lead	15
29 May – 6 Jun 2014	Ashcroft	523	39%	27%	10%	22%	2%	0%	12	
14–17 Apr 2014	Survation/Alan Bown	369	27.1%	28.2%	11.5%	31.6%	1.0%	0.6%	3.4	
28 Feb 2013	2013 Eastleigh by-election	–	32.1%	25.4%	9.8%	27.8%	–	4.9%	4.3	
22–24 Feb 2013	Ashcroft (By-election polling) (Note: Percentages for UKIP/Others based on a table that does not adjust for don't know/refusers)	416	33%	28%	12%	23%	–	4%	5	
19–22 Feb 2013	Populus/Times (By-election polling)	408	33%	28%	11%	25%	–	4%	5	
18–22 Feb 2013	Survation/Mail on Sunday (By-election polling)	402	29%	33%	13%	21%	–	4%	4	
6–8 Feb 2013	Survation/Mail on Sunday (Note: Percentage for Greens based on a table that does not adjust for don't know/refusers)	321	36%	33%	13%	16%	0.3%	0.1%	3	
4–5 Feb 2013	Ashcroft (By-election polling) (Note: Percentages for UKIP/Green/Others based on a table that does not adjust for don't know/refusers)	314	31%	34%	19%	15%	1%	1%	3	
2–5 Aug 2010	Ashcroft	513	31%	43%	20%	–	–	6%	12	
6 May 2010	2010 general election	–	46.5%	39.3%	9.6%	3.6%	–	1.0%	7.2	

==== Elmet and Rothwell ====
Date(s) conducted	Polling organisation/client	Sample size	Con	Lab	LD	UKIP	Green	Others	Lead	
8–13 Dec 2014	Ashcroft	1,000	39%	35%	6%	16%	3%	1%	Lead	4
6 May 2010	2010 general election	–	42.6%	34.5%	16.3%	2.9%	–	3.6%	8.1	

==== Enfield North ====
Date(s) conducted	Polling organisation/client	Sample size	Con	Lab	LD	UKIP	Green	Others	Lead	
17–25 Sep 2014	Ashcroft	1,000	34%	44%	3%	12%	3%	3%	Lead	10
6 May 2010	2010 general election	–	42.3%	38.5%	12.2%	2.1%	1.1%	3.9%	3.8	

==== Erewash ====
Date(s) conducted	Polling organisation/client	Sample size	Con	Lab	LD	UKIP	Green	Others	Lead	
3–14 Oct 2014	Ashcroft	1,003	30%	38%	5%	22%	3%	2%	Lead	8
6 May 2010	2010 general election	–	39.5%	34.2%	17.5%	1.8%	1.1%	2.9%	5.3	

==== Finchley and Golders Green ====
Date(s) conducted	Polling organisation/client	Sample size	Con	Lab	LD	UKIP	Green	Lead
7–11 Apr 2015	Ashcroft	1,001	41%	43%	6%	6%	4%	2
6 May 2010	2010 general election	–	46%	33.7%	17%	1.7%	1.6%	12.3

==== Folkestone and Hythe ====
Date(s) conducted	Polling organisation/client	Sample size	Con	LD	Lab	UKIP	Green	Others	Lead	
3–4 Apr 2014	Survation/Mail on Sunday	529	36.4%	9.6%	17.8%	32.9%	1.9%	1.5%	Lead	3.5
22–24 Nov 2013	Survation/Alan Bown	548	35%	10%	21%	28%	4%	2%	7	
6 May 2010	2010 general election	–	49.4%	30.3%	10.8%	4.6%	1.2%	3.6%	19.1	

==== Gloucester ====
Date(s) conducted	Polling organisation/client	Sample size	Con	Lab	LD	UKIP	Green	Others	Lead	
24 Mar – 4 Apr 2015	Ashcroft	1,001	40%	36%	9%	12%	3%	1%	Lead	4
24 Sep – 2 Oct 2014	Ashcroft	1,000	34%	33%	12%	18%	3%	0%	1	
6 May 2010	2010 general election	–	39.9%	35.2%	19.2%	3.6%	1%	1.1%	4.8	

==== Great Grimsby ====
Date(s) conducted	Polling organisation/client	Sample size	Lab	Con	LD	UKIP	Others	Lead
15–24 Apr 2015	Ashcroft	1000	42%	24%	5%	25%	4%	17
20–27 Nov 2014	Ashcroft	1,001	35%	20%	8%	34%	4%	1
5–11 May 2014	Ashcroft	1,001	38%	21%	10%	26%	5%	12
18–22 Oct 2013	Survation	506	40%	21%	11%	23%	5%	17
6 May 2010	2010 general election	–	32.7%	30.5%	22.4%	6.2%	8.1%	2.2

==== Great Yarmouth ====
Date(s) conducted	Polling organisation/client	Sample size	Con	Lab	LD	UKIP	Green	Others	Lead
15–24 Apr 2015	Ashcroft	1,000	36%	34%	2%	24%	4%	1%	2
11–16 Jul 2014	Ashcroft	1,000	33%	28%	3%	32%	3%	1%	1
21–27 Apr 2014	Ashcroft	1,001	32%	31%	5%	29%	2%	1%	1
22–24 Nov 2013	Survation/Alan Bown	507	27%	37%	3%	30%	–	2%	7
6 May 2010	2010 general election	–	43.1%	33.2%	14.4%	4.8%	1.0%	3.5%	9.9

==== Halesowen and Rowley Regis ====
Date(s) conducted	Polling organisation/client	Sample size	Con	Lab	LD	UKIP	Green	Others	Lead	
24 Feb – 5 Mar 2015	Ashcroft	1,000	37%	39%	4%	15%	3%	2%	Lead	2
24 Sep – 3 Oct 2014	Ashcroft	1,000	34%	35%	2%	24%	4%	1%	1	
6 May 2010	2010 general election	–	41.2%	36.6%	14.8%	6.4%	–	1.0%	4.6	

==== Halifax ====
Date(s) conducted	Polling organisation/client	Sample size	Lab	Con	LD	UKIP	Green	Others	Lead	
12–18 May 2014	Ashcroft	1,000	43%	26%	8%	18%	2%	3%	Lead	17
6 May 2010	2010 general election	–	37.4%	34%	19.1%	1.5%	–	8%	3.4	

==== Hampstead and Kilburn ====
Date(s) conducted	Polling organisation/client	Sample size	Lab	Con	LD	Green	UKIP	Others	Lead
23 Jul – 3 Aug 2014	Ashcroft	1,000	47%	30%	13%	6%	2%	1%	17
21–27 Apr 2014	Ashcroft	1,003	41%	30%	19%	6%	3%	0%	11
6 May 2010	2010 general election	–	32.8%	32.7%	31.2%	1.4%	0.8%	1%	0.1

==== Harlow ====
Date(s) conducted	Polling organisation/client	Sample size	Con	Lab	LD	UKIP	Green	Others	Lead	
2–10 Apr 2015	Ashcroft	1,000	44%	34%	3%	16%	2%	1%	Lead	10
6 May 2010	2010 general election	–	44.9%	33.7%	13.7%	3.6%	–	4.2%	11.2	

==== Harrogate and Knaresborough ====
Date(s) conducted	Polling organisation/client	Sample size	Con	LD	Lab	UKIP	Green	Others	Lead	
5–12 Jun 2014	Ashcroft	1,000	41%	24%	11%	16%	8%	0%	Lead	17
6 May 2010	2010 general election	–	45.7%	43.8%	6.4%	2%	–	2.1%	1.9	

==== Harrow East ====
Date(s) conducted	Polling organisation/client	Sample size	Con	Lab	LD	UKIP	Green	Others	Lead	
31 Mar – 4 Apr 2015	Ashcroft	1,001	40%	44%	4%	8%	3%	1%	Lead	4
1–7 Dec 2014	Ashcroft	1,000	40%	37%	6%	13%	3%	0%	3	
6 May 2010	2010 general election	–	44.7%	37.6%	14.3%	1.9%	1.7%	–	7.1	

==== Hastings and Rye ====
Date(s) conducted	Polling organisation/client	Sample size	Con	Lab	LD	UKIP	Green	Others	Lead	
17–25 Sep 2014	Ashcroft	1,001	31%	40%	5%	19%	3%	1%	Lead	9
6 May 2010	2010 general election	–	41.1%	37.1%	15.7%	2.8%	–	3.3%	4.0	

==== Hazel Grove ====
Date(s) conducted	Polling organisation/client	Sample size	LD	Con	Lab	UKIP	Green	Lead
4–15 Nov 2014	Ashcroft	1,000	35%	29%	15%	17%	4%	6
6 May 2010	2010 general election	–	48.8%	33.6%	12.5%	5.1%	–	15.2

==== Hendon ====
Date(s) conducted	Polling organisation/client	Sample size	Con	Lab	LD	UKIP	Green	Others	Lead	
18–29 Jun 2014	Ashcroft	1,001	34%	49%	4%	9%	1%	1%	Lead	15
31 Mar – 6 Apr 2014	Ashcroft	1,000	36%	44%	7%	11%	2%	1%	8	
6 May 2010	2010 general election	–	42.3%	42.1%	12.4%	2.1%	1.1%	–	0.2	

==== Heywood and Middleton ====
Date(s) conducted	Polling organisation/client	Sample size	Lab	Con	LD	UKIP	Green	Others	Lead
9 Oct 2014	2014 Heywood and Middleton by-election	–	40.9%	12.3%	5.1%	38.7%	3.1%	–	2.2
30 Sep – 4 Oct 2014	Ashcroft (By-election polling)	1,000	47%	16%	5%	28%	4%	–	19
30 Sep 2014	Survation/The Sun (By-election polling)	551	50%	13%	4%	31%	3%	–	19
6 May 2010	2010 general election	–	40.1%	27.2%	22.7%	2.6%	–	7.4%	12.9

==== High Peak ====
Date(s) conducted	Polling organisation/client	Sample size	Con	Lab	LD	UKIP	Green	Others	Lead	
17–23 Apr 2015	Ashcroft	1,000	40%	38%	7%	10%	5%	1%	Lead	2
6 May 2010	2010 general election	–	40.9%	31.6%	21.8%	3.4%	1.8%	0.4%	9.3	

==== Hornsey and Wood Green ====
Date(s) conducted	Polling organisation/client	Sample size	LD	Lab	Con	Green	UKIP	Others	Lead	
3 Mar 2015	Liberal Democrats (fieldwork by Survation)	325	36%	37%	15%	7%	4%	1%	Lead	1
3–13 Sep 2014	Ashcroft	1,000	30%	43%	14%	8%	3%	1%	13	
6 May 2010	2010 general election	–	46.5%	34.0%	16.7%	2.3%	–	0.6%	12.5	

==== Hove ====
Date(s) conducted	Polling organisation/client	Sample size	Con	Lab	LD	Green	UKIP	Others	Lead	
7 May 2015	2015 general election	–	39.9%	42.3%	3.6%	6.8%	6.3%	1.1%	Lead	2.4
1–4 Apr 2015	Ashcroft	1,002	37%	43%	5%	9%	5%	1%	6	
17–27 Sep 2014	Ashcroft	1,000	34%	37%	6%	12%	11%	–	3	
6 May 2010	2010 general election	–	36.7%	33.0%	22.6%	5.2%	2.4%	0.2%	3.7	

==== Ipswich ====
Date(s) conducted	Polling organisation/client	Sample size	Con	Lab	LD	UKIP	Green	Others	Lead	
24 Sep – 2 Oct 2014	Ashcroft	1,000	31%	38%	6%	19%	5%	1%	Lead	7
6 May 2010	2010 general election	–	39.1%	34.7%	18.2%	2.9%	1.7%	3.3%	4.4	

==== Keighley ====
Date(s) conducted	Polling organisation/client	Sample size	Con	Lab	LD	UKIP	Green	Others	Lead	
20–26 Oct 2014	Ashcroft	1,000	31%	37%	5%	23%	3%	1%	Lead	6
6 May 2010	2010 general election	–	41.9%	35.8%	14.8%	3.1%	–	4.4%	6.1	

==== Kingston and Surbiton ====
Date(s) conducted	Polling organisation/client	Sample size	LD	Con	Lab	UKIP	Green	Others	Lead	
29 Oct – 8 Nov 2014	Ashcroft	1,000	38%	30%	16%	10%	6%	1%	Lead	8
6 May 2010	2010 general election	–	49.8%	36.5%	9.3%	2.5%	1%	0.8%	13.3	

==== Kingswood ====
Date(s) conducted	Polling organisation/client	Sample size	Con	Lab	LD	UKIP	Green	Others	Lead	
28 Mar – 3 Apr 2015	Ashcroft	1,001	42%	33%	5%	15%	4%	1%	Lead	9
3–14 Oct 2014	Ashcroft	1,001	34%	32%	6%	23%	4%	1%	2	
6 May 2010	2010 general election	–	40.4%	35.3%	16.8%	3.2%	0.8%	3.4%	5.1	

==== Lancaster and Fleetwood ====
Date(s) conducted	Polling organisation/client	Sample size	Con	Lab	LD	UKIP	Green	Others	Lead	
26 Jun – 4 Jul 2014	Ashcroft	1,000	27%	41%	4%	18%	10%	1%	Lead	14
8–13 Apr 2014	Ashcroft	1,002	29%	43%	6%	12%	9%	1%	14	
6 May 2010	2010 general election	–	36.1%	35.2%	19.1%	4.4%	–	2.7%	0.8	

==== Lewes ====
Date(s) conducted	Polling organisation/client	Sample size	LD	Con	Lab	UKIP	Green	Others	Lead	
7 May 2015	2015 general election	–	35.9%	38.0%	9.9%	10.7%	5.5%	-	Lead	2.1
11–20 Nov 2014	Ashcroft	1,000	37%	29%	9%	15%	7%	2%	8	
6 May 2010	2010 general election	–	52%	36.7%	5.0%	3.4%	1.5%	1.4%	15.3	

==== Lincoln ====
Date(s) conducted	Polling organisation/client	Sample size	Con	Lab	LD	UKIP	Green	Others	Lead	
14–21 Jul 2014	Ashcroft	1,000	35%	39%	6%	17%	3%	1%	Lead	4
6 May 2010	2010 general election	–	37.5%	35.2%	20.2%	2.2%	–	4.8%	2.3	

==== Loughborough ====
Date(s) conducted	Polling organisation/client	Sample size	Con	Lab	LD	UKIP	Green	Others	Lead	
31 Mar – 3 Apr 2015	Ashcroft	1,000	45%	36%	3%	12%	3%	1%	Lead	9
22–25 Oct 2014	Ashcroft	1,000	40%	37%	5%	12%	3%	3%	3	
6 May 2010	2010 general election	–	41.6%	34.5%	18.3%	1.8%	–	3.9%	7.1	

==== Manchester Withington ====
Date(s) conducted	Polling organisation/client	Sample size	LD	Lab	Con	Green	UKIP	Others	Lead	
11–21 Jun 2014	Ashcroft	1,000	22%	56%	7%	10%	4%	1%	Lead	34
6 May 2010	2010 general election	–	44.6%	40.5%	11.1%	1.8%	1.5%	0.4%	4.1	

==== Mid Dorset and North Poole ====
Date(s) conducted	Polling organisation/client	Sample size	LD	Con	Lab	UKIP	Green	Others	Lead	
31 Jul – 9 Aug 2014	Ashcroft	1,000	32%	38%	8%	19%	3%	1%	Lead	6
12–18 May 2014	Ashcroft	1,000	32%	39%	8%	17%	3%	1%	7	
6 May 2010	2010 general election	–	45.1%	44.5%	5.9%	4.5%	–	–	0.6	

==== Milton Keynes South ====
Date(s) conducted	Polling organisation/client	Sample size	Con	Lab	LD	UKIP	Green	Others	Lead	
7–10 Apr 2015	Ashcroft	1,000	37%	39%	8%	10%	4%	2%	Lead	2
6 May 2010	2010 general election	–	41.6%	32.2%	17.7%	3.7%	1.4%	3.3%	9.4	

==== Morecambe and Lunesdale ====
Date(s) conducted	Polling organisation/client	Sample size	Con	Lab	LD	UKIP	Green	Others	Lead	
1–4 Apr 2015	Ashcroft	1,000	36%	42%	5%	12%	5%	1%	Lead	6
7–11 Jul 2014	Ashcroft	1,001	34%	37%	6%	18%	4%	2%	3	
14–20 Apr 2014	Ashcroft	1,000	37%	39%	5%	12%	3%	1%	2	
6 May 2010	2010 general election	–	41.5%	39.5%	13.3%	4.2%	1.4%	–	2.0	

==== Morley and Outwood ====
Date(s) conducted	Polling organisation/client	Sample size	Lab	Con	LD	UKIP	Green	Others	Lead	
5–11 May 2014	Ashcroft	1,003	41%	24%	5%	20%	2%	8%	Lead	17
6 May 2010	2010 general election	–	37.6%	35.3%	16.8%	3.1%	–	7.2%	2.3	

==== Newark ====
Date(s) conducted	Polling organisation/client	Sample size	Con	Lab	LD	UKIP	Others	Lead
5 Jun 2014	2014 Newark by-election	–	45.0%	17.7%	3%	25.9%	8%	19.1
2–3 Jun 2014	Survation	678	42%	22%	4%	27%	5%	15
27 May – 1 Jun 2014	Ashcroft (By-election polling)	1,000	42%	20%	6%	27%	5%	15
27–28 May 2014	Survation/The Sun	606	36%	27%	5%	28%	5%	8
6 May 2010	2010 general election	–	53.9%	22.3%	20.0%	3.8%	–	31.5

==== Newton Abbot ====
Date(s) conducted	Polling organisation/client	Sample size	Con	LD	Lab	UKIP	Green	Others	Lead
5–12 Jun 2014	Ashcroft	1,000	39%	20%	13%	20%	7%	1%	19
6 May 2010	2010 general election	–	43%	41.9%	7.0%	6.4%	1.5%	1.1%	1.1

==== North Cornwall ====
Date(s) conducted	Polling organisation/client	Sample size	LD	Con	UKIP	Lab	Green	Others	Lead	
24–29 Apr 2015	Ashcroft	1,002	38%	36%	14%	5%	5%	3%	Lead	2
12–20 Mar 2015	Ashcroft	1,004	38%	36%	13%	6%	6%	1%	2	
15–20 Aug 2014	Ashcroft	1,000	33%	33%	20%	10%	3%	1%	Tie	
26 May – 1 Jun 2014	Ashcroft	1,001	31%	31%	24%	8%	5%	2%	Tie	
6 May 2010	2010 general election	–	48.1%	41.7%	4.9%	4.2%	–	1.1%	6.4	

==== North Devon ====
Date(s) conducted	Polling organisation/client	Sample size	LD	Con	UKIP	Lab	Green	Others	Lead
24–26 Mar 2015	Ashcroft	1,001	31%	38%	16%	8%	6%	2%	7
29 Oct – 6 Nov 2014	Ashcroft	1,000	29%	30%	23%	9%	7%	2%	1
6 May 2010	2010 general election	–	47.4%	36.0%	7.2%	5.2%	1.4%	2.8%	11.4

==== North East Cambridgeshire ====
Date(s) conducted	Polling organisation/client	Sample size	Con	LD	Lab	UKIP	Green	Others	Lead	
26 Jan – 5 Feb 2015	Ashcroft	1,000	46%	7%	17%	25%	4%	1%	Lead	21
6 May 2010	2010 general election	–	51.6%	20.0%	17.8%	5.4%	–	5.2%	31.6	

==== North East Somerset ====
Date(s) conducted	Polling organisation/client	Sample size	Lab	Con	LD	UKIP	Green	Others	Lead	
7–11 Apr 2015	Ashcroft	1,001	28%	44%	9%	10%	8%	1%	Lead	16
6 May 2010	2010 general election	–	31.7%	41.3%	22.3%	3.4%	1.3%	–	9.6	

==== North Warwickshire ====
Date(s) conducted	Polling organisation/client	Sample size	Con	Lab	LD	UKIP	Green	Others	Lead	
18–28 Jun 2014	Ashcroft	1,000	30%	41%	2%	22%	2%	2%	Lead	11
31 Mar – 6 Apr 2014	Ashcroft	1,001	35%	43%	3%	15%	3%	1%	8	
6 May 2010	2010 general election	–	40.2%	40.1%	11.6%	2.8%	–	0.9%	0.1	

==== Norwich North ====
Date(s) conducted	Polling organisation/client	Sample size	Con	Lab	LD	UKIP	Green	Others	Lead	
24–30 Apr 2015	Ashcroft	1,000	36%	38%	6%	12%	8%	1%	Lead	2
4–12 Feb 2015	Ashcroft	1,000	34%	35%	5%	18%	10%	0%	1	
6 May 2010	2010 general election	–	40.6%	31.4%	18.3%	4.4%	2.9%	2.4%	9.2	

==== Norwich South ====
Date(s) conducted	Polling organisation/client	Sample size	LD	Lab	Con	Green	UKIP	Others	Lead	
11–21 Jun 2014	Ashcroft	1,000	12%	33%	18%	20%	15%	1%	Lead	13
6 May 2010	2010 general election	–	29.4%	28.7%	22.9%	14.9%	2.4%	1.7%	0.7	

==== Nuneaton ====
Date(s) conducted	Polling organisation/client	Sample size	Con	Lab	LD	BNP	UKIP	Green	Others	Lead	
26 Feb – 5 Mar 2015	Ashcroft	1,000	34%	39%	4%	–	14%	8%	1%	Lead	5
24 Sep – 3 Oct 2014	Ashcroft	1,000	36%	39%	3%	–	19%	2%	1%	3	
6 May 2010	2010 general election	–	41.5%	36.9%	15.3%	6.3%	–	–	-	4.6	

==== Oxford West and Abingdon ====
Date(s) conducted	Polling organisation/client	Sample size	Con	LD	Lab	UKIP	Green	Others	Lead	
21–28 Aug 2014	Ashcroft	1,000	38%	30%	18%	9%	4%	<0.5%	Lead	8
30 May – 5 Jun 2014	Ashcroft	1,000	36%	25%	18%	11%	8%	1%	11	
6 May 2010	2010 general election	–	42.3%	42.0%	10.6%	2.7%	2.1%	0.3%	0.3	

==== Pendle ====
Date(s) conducted	Polling organisation/client	Sample size	Con	Lab	LD	UKIP	Green	Others	Lead	
31 Mar – 4 Apr 2015	Ashcroft	1,000	41%	37%	8%	10%	4%	1%	Lead	4
8–14 Dec 2014	Ashcroft	1,000	36%	33%	11%	17%	2%	1%	3	
6 May 2010	2010 general election	–	38.9%	30.9%	20.2%	3.3%	–	6.7%	8.0	

==== Plymouth Moor View ====
Date(s) conducted	Polling organisation/client	Sample size	Lab	Con	LD	UKIP	Green	Others	Lead	
15–23 Jul 2014	Ashcroft	506	35%	26%	5%	30%	2%	1%	Lead	5
6 May 2010	2010 general election	–	37.2%	33.3%	16.9%	7.7%	1.0%	4.0%	3.8	

==== Plymouth Sutton & Devonport ====
Date(s) conducted	Polling organisation/client	Sample size	Con	Lab	LD	UKIP	Green	Others	Lead	
15–23 Jul 2014	Ashcroft	506	26%	39%	6%	21%	8%	1%	Lead	8
6 May 2010	2010 general election	–	34.3%	31.7%	24.7%	6.5%	2.1%	0.7%	2.6	

==== Portsmouth South ====
Date(s) conducted	Polling organisation/client	Sample size	LD	Con	Lab	UKIP	Green	Others	Lead
29 Oct – 6 Nov 2014	Ashcroft	1,001	25%	30%	20%	17%	6%	1%	5
6 May 2010	2010 general election	–	45.9%	33.3%	13.7%	2.1%	1.7%	3.4%	12.6

==== Redcar ====
Date(s) conducted	Polling organisation/client	Sample size	LD	Lab	Con	UKIP	Green	Others	Lead
27 Aug – 6 Sep 2014	Ashcroft	1,000	18%	44%	12%	23%	2%	1%	21
17–19 Apr 2014	ICM/Lord Oakeshott	500	15%	47%	15%	19%	2%	2%	28
6 May 2010	2010 general election	–	45.2%	32.7%	13.8%	4.5%	–	3.8%	12.5

==== Rochester and Strood ====
Date(s) conducted	Polling organisation/client	Sample size	Con	Lab	LD	Green	UKIP	Others	Lead	
15–22 Apr 2015	Ashcroft	1000	36%	24%	3%	4%	33%	1%	Lead	3
20 Nov 2014	2014 Rochester and Strood by-election	–	34.8%	16.8%	0.9%	4.2%	42.1%	2.2%	7.3	
7–10 Nov 2014	Ashcroft	543	36%	21%	2%	5%	35%	1%	1	
7–10 Nov 2014	Ashcroft (By-election polling)	543	32%	17%	2%	4% (Note: Based on a table that does not adjust for don't know/refusers)	44%	1%	12	
27–28 Oct 2014	Survation	1,012	33%	16%	1%	1.7%	48%	2%	15	
17–21 Oct 2014	ComRes (Note: By-election polling)	949	30%	21%	3%	2%	43%	1%	13	
4 Oct 2014	Survation/Mail on Sunday	677	31%	25%	2%	1%	40%	0.4%	9	
6 May 2010	2010 general election	–	49.2%	28.5%	16.3%	1.5%	–	4.5%	20.7	

==== Rother Valley ====
Date(s) conducted	Polling organisation/client	Sample size	Lab	Con	LD	BNP	UKIP	Green	Others	Lead	
24–29 Nov 2014	Ashcroft	480	40%	18%	4%	<0.5%	34%	3%	2%	Lead	6
6 May 2010	2010 general election	–	40.9%	28.4%	17.3%	7.7%	5.6%	–	–	12.5	

==== Sheffield Hallam ====
The Liberal Democrat candidate was its leader and Deputy Prime Minister, Nick Clegg.

Date(s) conducted	Polling organisation/client	Sample size	LD	Con	Lab	UKIP	Green	Others	Lead
4 May 2015	ICM/Guardian^{1}	501	42%	12%	35%	7%	3%	2%	7
22–28 Apr 2015	Ashcroft	1,000	36%	15%	37%	7%	4%	1%	1
22–28 Mar 2015	Ashcroft	1,001	34%	16%	36%	7%	6%	1%	2
22–29 Jan 2015	Survation/Unite	1,011	23%	22%	33%	9%	12%	<0.5%	10
20–22 Nov 2014	Ashcroft	962	27% (Note: This poll originally, erroneously, showed a small lead for the LDs: see http://lordashcroftpolls.com/2015/02/sheffield-hallam-doncaster-north-thanet-south/#more-7536)	19%	30%	13%	10%	1%	3
29 Apr – 4 May 2014	ICM/Lord Oakeshott	500	23%	24%	33%	10%	8%	1%	9
1–4 Oct 2010	Populus/Ashcroft	1,000	33%	28%	31%	–	–	8%	2
6 May 2010	2010 general election	–	53.4%	23.5%	16.1%	2.3%	1.8%	2.7%	29.9

^{1}: These figures represent the results when respondents were presented with named candidates. When asked to think only about the political parties [the methodology used by the Ashcroft polls] the figures showed a small Labour lead.

==== Solihull ====
Date(s) conducted	Polling organisation/client	Sample size	LD	Con	Lab	UKIP	Green	Others	Lead	
31 Jul – 10 Aug 2014	Ashcroft	1,000	28%	37%	12%	16%	6%	1%	Lead	9
12–18 May 2014	Ashcroft	1,000	28%	37%	12%	16%	6%	1%	9	
6 May 2010	2010 general election	–	42.9%	42.6%	8.9%	2.2%	–	3.5%	0.3	

==== Southampton Itchen ====
Date(s) conducted	Polling organisation/client	Sample size	Lab	Con	LD	UKIP	Green	Others	Lead	
24 Feb – 7 Mar 2015	Ashcroft	1,000	35%	30%	7%	20%	8%	–	Lead	5
6 May 2010	2010 general election	–	36.8%	36.3%	20.8%	4.3%	1.4%	0.4%	0.4	

==== South Basildon and East Thurrock ====
Date(s) conducted	Polling organisation/client	Sample size	Con	Lab	LD	UKIP	Green	Others	Lead
26 Jan – 5 Feb 2015	Ashcroft	1,001	35%	28%	3%	29%	3%	1%	6
6 May 2010	2010 general election	–	43.9%	31.0%	13.4%	5.9%	–	5.9%	12.9

==== South Swindon ====
Date(s) conducted	Polling organisation/client	Sample size	Con	Lab	LD	UKIP	Green	Others	Lead	
22–28 Apr 2015	Ashcroft	1,000	37%	36%	6%	16%	4%	–	Lead	1
3–12 Mar 2015	Ashcroft	1,000	36%	35%	5%	19%	4%	2%	1	
1–6 Dec 2014	Ashcroft	508	34%	34%	7%	20%	4%	1%	Tie	
6 May 2010	2010 general election	–	41.8%	34.3%	17.6%	4.3%	1.3%	0.7%	7.5	

==== South Thanet ====
Date(s) conducted	Polling organisation/client	Sample size	Con	Lab	LD	UKIP	Others	Lead
22–28 Apr 2015	Ashcroft	1,000	34%	26%	3%	32%	5%	2
22 Apr 2015	Survation/Alan Bown (Note: Candidates named in the poll.)	1,057	30%	26%	2%	39%	3%	9
13–18 Mar 2015	ComRes/Chartwell Political	1,003	31%	29%	5%	30%	5%	1
18–20 Feb 2015	Survation/Alan Bown	1,011	27%	28%	2%	38%	5%	10
23–24 Nov 2014	Ashcroft	1,003	33%	27%	4%	32%	4%	1
11–16 Jul 2014	Ashcroft	1,000	29%	29%	4%	33%	5%	4
21–27 Apr 2014	Ashcroft	1,000	32%	31%	7%	27%	3%	1
22–24 Nov 2013	Survation	515	28%	35%	5%	30%	2%	5
6 May 2010	2010 general election	–	48.0%	31.4%	15.1%	5.5%	–	16.6

==== South West Surrey ====
Date(s) conducted	Polling organisation/client	Sample size	Con	LD	Lab	UKIP	Green	Others	Lead	
4–5 Dec 2014	Survation/Unite	587	57%	8%	11%	15%	7%	1%	Lead	42
6 May 2010	2010 general election	–	58.7%	30.2%	6.0%	2.6%	1.2%	1.4%	28.5	

==== St Austell and Newquay ====
Date(s) conducted	Polling organisation/client	Sample size	LD	Con	Lab	UKIP	Green	Others	Lead
15 Mar 2015	Ashcroft	1002	26%	32%	10%	20%	6%	4%	6
6–16 Aug 2014	Ashcroft	493	26%	27%	13%	25%	6%	3%	1
19–25 May 2014	Ashcroft (Note: Share for Greens based on a table that did not further prompt "don't know" and refusers.)	473	24%	32%	10%	25%	4%	5%	7
6 May 2010	2010 general election	–	42.7%	40.0%	7.2%	3.7%	–	6.4%	2.8

==== Stevenage ====
Date(s) conducted	Polling organisation/client	Sample size	Con	Lab	LD	UKIP	Green	Others	Lead
8–13 Dec 2014	Ashcroft	497	33%	38%	7%	18%	3%	0%	5
6 May 2010	2010 general election	–	41.4%	33.4%	16.6%	4.5%	–	4.1%	8.0

==== Stockton South ====
Date(s) conducted	Polling organisation/client	Sample size	Con	Lab	LD	UKIP	Green	Others	Lead	
31 Mar – 4 Apr 2015	Ashcroft	1000	39%	44%	3%	9%	1%	3%	Lead	5
6–12 Nov 2014	Survation/Unite	571	39.1%	36.5%	2.8%	18.2%	3.1%	0.2%	2.6	
26 Jun – 4 Jul 2014	Ashcroft	521	35%	38%	4%	19%	2%	2%	3	
7–13 Apr 2014	Ashcroft	512	36%	43%	5%	12%	0%	3%	7	
6 May 2010	2010 general election	–	38.9%	38.3%	15.1%	2.9%	–	4.8%	0.6	

==== Stroud ====
Date(s) conducted	Polling organisation/client	Sample size	Con	Lab	LD	Green	UKIP	Others	Lead	
11–16 Jul 2014	Ashcroft	561	30%	41%	6%	11%	11%	<0.5%	Lead	11
6 May 2010	2010 general election	–	40.8%	38.6%	15.4%	2.7%	2.2%	0.2%	2.2	

==== Sutton and Cheam ====
Date(s) conducted	Polling organisation/client	Sample size	LD	Con	Lab	UKIP	Green	Others	Lead
6–16 Aug 2014	Ashcroft	1,000	45%	27%	11%	14%	3%	0%	18
6 May 2010	2010 general election	–	45.7%	42.4%	7.0%	2.0%	0.5%	2.5%	3.3

==== Thurrock ====
Date(s) conducted	Polling organisation/client	Sample size	Con	Lab	LD	UKIP	Others	Lead
7 May 2015	2015 general election	–	33.7%	32.6%	1.3%	31.7%	0.7%	1.1
17–23 Apr 2015	Ashcroft	1,000	30%	31%	1%	35%	3%	4
18–26 Jun 2014	Ashcroft	1,002	28%	30%	2%	36%	4%	6
31 Mar – 6 Apr 2014	Ashcroft	394	27%	37%	4%	29%	3%	8
6 May 2010	2010 general election	–	36.8%	36.6%	10.7%	7.4%	8.5%	0.2

==== Torbay ====
Date(s) conducted	Polling organisation/client	Sample size	LD	Con	Lab	UKIP	Green	Others	Lead
7 May 2015	2015 general election	–	33.8%	40.7%	8.7%	13.6%	3.2%	0.0%	6.9
12–21 Mar 2015	Ashcroft	1,000	34%	33%	11%	17%	3%	1%	1
27 Aug – 6 Sep 2014	Ashcroft	1,001	30%	30%	15%	21%	3%	1%	Tie
6 May 2010	2010 general election	–	47.0%	38.7%	6.6%	5.3%	1.0%	1.4%	8.3

==== Twickenham ====
Date(s) conducted	Polling organisation/client	Sample size	LD	Con	Lab	UKIP	Green	BNP	Others	Lead	
11–16 Apr 2014	ICM/Oakeshott	501	32%	34%	23%	5%	4%	1%	1%	Lead	2
6 May 2010	2010 general election	–	54.4%	34.1%	7.7%	1.5%	1.1%	1.1%	0.2%	20.3	

==== Warwick & Leamington ====
Date(s) conducted	Polling organisation/client	Sample size	Con	Lab	LD	UKIP	Green	Others	Lead	
1–6 Dec 2014	Ashcroft	534	38%	34%	7%	14%	7%	<0.5%	Lead	4
6 May 2010	2010 general election	–	42.6%	35.4%	18.3%	1.9%	1.4%	0.4%	7.2	

==== Watford ====
Date(s) conducted	Polling organisation/client	Sample size	Con	LD	Lab	UKIP	Green	Others	Lead	
7 May 2015	2015 general election	–	43.5%	18.1%	26.0%	9.8%	2.4%	0.3%	Lead	17.4
11–20 Nov 2014	Ashcroft	525	30%	28%	24%	14%	3%	0%	2	
20–28 Aug 2014	Ashcroft	525	27%	25%	29%	14%	4%	1%	2	
19 May – 6 Jun 2014	Ashcroft	524	29%	24%	25%	16%	6%	0%	4	
6 May 2010	2010 general election	–	34.9%	32.4%	26.7%	2.2%	1.6%	2.2%	2.6	

==== Weaver Vale ====
Date(s) conducted	Polling organisation/client	Sample size	Con	Lab	LD	UKIP	Green	Others	Lead	
14–22 Jul 2014	Ashcroft	1,001	32%	41%	6%	18%	2%	1%	Lead	9
6 May 2010	2010 general election	–	38.5%	36.3%	18.6%	2.3%	0.8%	3.4%	2.2	

==== Wirral West ====
Date(s) conducted	Polling organisation/client	Sample size	Con	Lab	LD	UKIP	Green	Others	Lead	
24–30 Apr 2015	Ashcroft	1,000	43%	46%	3%	5%	2%	0%	Lead	3
3–12 Mar 2015	Ashcroft	1,000	37%	42%	5%	10%	5%	1%	5	
22–26 Oct 2014	Ashcroft	1,000	38%	39%	6%	12%	4%	1%	1	
6 May 2010	2010 general election	–	42.5%	36.3%	16.8%	2.3%	–	2.1%	6.2	

==== Witney ====
The Conservative Party candidate was its leader and Prime Minister, David Cameron.

Date(s) conducted	Polling organisation/client	Sample size	Con	LD	Lab	Green	UKIP	Others	Lead
2–4 Dec 2014	Survation/Unite	531	53%	4%	16%	7%	19%	1%	34
6 May 2010	2010 general election	–	58.8%	19.4%	13.0%	4.1%	3.5%	1.2%	39.4

==== Worcester ====
Date(s) conducted	Polling organisation/client	Sample size	Con	Lab	LD	UKIP	BNP	Green	Others	Lead	
3–12 Mar 2015	Ashcroft	1,002	38%	33%	4%	15%	–	7%	2%	Lead	5
13–19 Oct 2014	Ashcroft	1,002	34%	36%	5%	17%	–	7%	1%	2	
6 May 2010	2010 general election	–	39.5%	33.4%	19.4%	2.8%	2.5%	1.5%	0.7%	6.1	

==== Wyre Forest ====
Date(s) conducted	Polling organisation/client	Sample size	Con	ICHC	Lab	LD	UKIP	Green	BNP	Others	Lead	
11–20 Nov 2014	Ashcroft	518	32%	–	16%	7%	27%	5%	<1%	13%	Lead	5
6 May 2010	2010 general election	–	36.9%	31.7%	14.3%	11.9%	2.9%	–	2.2%	–	5.2	

==== Wythenshawe and Sale East ====
Date(s) conducted	Polling organisation/client	Sample size	Lab	Con	LD	UKIP	Others	Lead
13 Feb 2014	2014 Wythenshawe and Sale East by-election	–	55.3%	14.5%	4.9%	18.0%	7.3%	37.3
3–5 Feb 2014	Ashcroft (By-election polling)	1,009	61%	14%	5%	15%	4%	46
6 May 2010	2010 general election	–	44.1%	25.6%	22.3%	3.4%	4.6%	18.6

=== Northern Ireland ===
==== Belfast East ====
Date(s) conducted	Polling organisation/client	Sample size	DUP	APNI	UUP	PUP	TUV	SF	UKIP	Green	SDLP	Others	Lead	
7 May 2015	2015 general election	–	49.3%	42.8%	–	–	–	2.1%	–	–	0.3%	2.8%	Lead	6.5
12–28 Jan 2015	LucidTalk	820	34.4%	28.7%	14.6%	6.5%	2.8%	1.8%	1.6%	1.5%	0.8%	7.5%	5.7	
6 May 2010	2010 general election	–	32.8%	37.2%	21.2%	–	5.4%	2.4%	–	–	1.1%	–	4.4	

=== Scotland ===
==== Airdrie and Shotts ====
Date(s) conducted	Polling organisation/client	Sample size	Lab	SNP	Con	LD	UKIP	Green	Others	Lead
7 May 2015	2015 general election	–	34.1%	53.9%	7.7%	1.5%	2.5%	–	0.3%	19.8
14–22 Jan 2015	Ashcroft	1,000	39%	47%	7%	1%	5%	1%	0%	8
6 May 2010	2010 general election	–	58.2%	23.5%	8.7%	8.1%	–	–	1.5%	34.6

==== Ayr, Carrick and Cumnock ====
Date(s) conducted	Polling organisation/client	Sample size	Lab	Con	SNP	LD	UKIP	Green	Others	Lead
7 May 2015	2015 general election	–	27.3%	19.8%	48.8%	1.6%	2.5%	–	–	21.6
10–19 Feb 2015	Ashcroft	1,000	31%	21%	42%	2%	3%	0%	1%	11
6 May 2010	2010 general election	–	47.1%	25.5%	18.0%	9.3%	–	–	–	21.6

==== Berwickshire, Roxburgh and Selkirk ====
Date(s) conducted	Polling organisation/client	Sample size	LD	Con	Lab	SNP	UKIP	Green	Others	Lead	
7 May 2015	2015 general election	–	18.7%	36.0%	4.9%	36.6%	2.4%	1.1%	0.2%	Lead	0.6
13–16 Apr 2015	Ashcroft	1,001	28%	30%	9%	29%	3%	1%	0%	1	
6 May 2010	2010 general election	–	45.4%	33.8%	10.2%	9.2%	1.2%	–	0.3%	11.6	

==== Coatbridge, Chryston and Bellshill ====
Date(s) conducted	Polling organisation/client	Sample size	Lab	SNP	LD	Con	UKIP	Green	Others	Lead	
7 May 2015	2015 general election	–	33.9%	56.6%	1.1%	6.3%	2.1%	–	–	Lead	22.7
7–17 Jan 2015	Ashcroft	1,001	43%	46%	1%	6%	3%	1%	1%	3	
6 May 2010	2010 general election	–	66.6%	16.8%	8.5%	8.1%	–	–	–	49.8	

==== Cumbernauld, Kilsyth and Kirkintilloch East ====
Date(s) conducted	Polling organisation/client	Sample size	Lab	SNP	LD	Con	UKIP	Green	Others	Lead	
7 May 2015	2015 general election	–	30.0%	59.9%	2.2%	7.9%	–	–	–	Lead	29.9
14–22 Jan 2015	Ashcroft	1,000	34%	52%	2%	6%	3%	3%	1%	18	
6 May 2010	2010 general election	–	57.2%	23.8%	9.5%	8.3%	–	–	1.2%	33.3	

==== Dumfries and Galloway ====
Date(s) conducted	Polling organisation/client	Sample size	Lab	Con	SNP	LD	UKIP	Green	Others	Lead	
7 May 2015	2015 general election	–	24.7%	29.9%	41.4%	1.7%	2.3%	–	–	Lead	11.5
19–26 Feb 2015	Ashcroft	1,002	28%	30%	34%	2%	4%	2%	0%	4	
6 May 2010	2010 general election	–	45.9%	31.6%	12.3%	8.8%	1.3%	–	–	14.3	

==== Dumfriesshire, Clydesdale and Tweeddale ====
Date(s) conducted	Polling organisation/client	Sample size	Con	Lab	LD	SNP	UKIP	Green	Others	Lead	
7 May 2015	2015 general election	–	39.8%	14.8%	2.7%	38.3%	2.8%	1.6%	–	Lead	1.5
24–29 Apr 2015	Ashcroft	1,000	31%	17%	5%	42%	4%	2%	–	11	
9–15 Apr 2015	Ashcroft	1,000	34%	20%	4%	36%	2%	2%	1%	2	
10–19 Feb 2015	Ashcroft	1,001	34%	18%	7%	34%	4%	2%	1%	Tie	
6 May 2010	2010 general election	–	38.0%	28.9%	19.8%	10.8%	1.4%	1.1%	–	9.1	

==== Dundee West ====
Date(s) conducted	Polling organisation/client	Sample size	Lab	SNP	LD	Con	UKIP	Green	Others	Lead	
7 May 2015	2015 general election	–	23.7%	61.9%	2.4%	8.6%	–	2.7%	0.7%	Lead	38.2
23–30 Jan 2015	Ashcroft	1,000	25%	59%	3%	6%	2%	5%	0%	34	
6 May 2010	2010 general election	–	48.5%	28.9%	11.4%	9.3%	–	–	1.9%	19.6	

==== East Dunbartonshire ====
Date(s) conducted	Polling organisation/client	Sample size	LD	Lab	Con	SNP	UKIP	Green	Others	Lead	
7 May 2015	2015 general election	–	36.3%	12.3%	8.6%	40.3%	1.0%	1.5%	–	Lead	4.0
10–16 Apr 2015	Ashcroft	1,000	29%	16%	12%	40%	1%	1%	0%	11	
6 May 2010	2010 general election	–	38.7%	34.1%	15.5%	10.5%	1.1%	–	-	4.6	

==== East Renfrewshire ====
Date(s) conducted	Polling organisation/client	Sample size	Lab	Con	LD	SNP	UKIP	Green	Lead
7 May 2015	2015 general election	–	34.0%	21.9%	1.8%	40.6%	1.6%	–	6.5
24–30 Apr 2015	Ashcroft	1,000	36%	20%	3%	39%	1%	1%	3
11–16 Apr 2015	Ashcroft	1,002	31%	25%	3%	40%	1%	1%	9
16–26 Feb 2015	Ashcroft	1,000	34%	26%	2%	33%	1%	3%	1
6 May 2010	2010 general election	–	50.8%	30.4%	9.2%	8.9%	0.7%	–	20.4

==== Edinburgh North and Leith ====
Date(s) conducted	Polling organisation/client	Sample size	Lab	LD	Con	SNP	Green	UKIP	Others	Lead	
14–17 Apr 2015	Ashcroft	1,000	29%	6%	14%	43%	6%	1%	0%	Lead	14
6 May 2010	2010 general election	–	37.5%	33.8%	14.9%	9.6%	2.2%	–	1.6%	3.5	

==== Edinburgh South ====
Date(s) conducted	Polling organisation/client	Sample size	Lab	LD	Con	SNP	Green	UKIP	Others	Lead	
13–17 Apr 2015	Ashcroft	1,000	34%	8%	16%	37%	4%	1%	1%	Lead	3
6 May 2010	2010 general election	–	34.7%	34.0%	21.6%	7.7%	2.0%	–	–	0.7	

==== Edinburgh South West ====
Date(s) conducted	Polling organisation/client	Sample size	Lab	Con	LD	SNP	Green	UKIP	Others	Lead	
11–19 Feb 2015	Ashcroft	1,000	27%	19%	4%	40%	7%	2%	0%	Lead	13
6 May 2010	2010 general election	–	42.8%	24.3%	18.0%	12.2%	1.9%	–	0.8%	18.6	

==== Glasgow Central ====
Date(s) conducted	Polling organisation/client	Sample size	Lab	SNP	LD	Con	Green	UKIP	Others	Lead	
5–10 Jan 2015	Ashcroft	1,000	35%	45%	3%	5%	7%	3%	2%	Lead	10
6 May 2010	2010 general election	–	52.0%	17.5%	16.4%	7.1%	2.6%	0.8%	3.6%	34.5	

==== Glasgow East ====
Date(s) conducted	Polling organisation/client	Sample size	Lab	SNP	LD	Con	UKIP	Green	Others	Lead	
5–8 Jan 2015	Ashcroft	1,001	37%	51%	1%	4%	4%	2%	2%	Lead	14
6 May 2010	2010 general election	–	61.6%	24.7%	5.0%	4.5%	0.6%	–	3.5%	36.8	

==== Glasgow North ====
Date(s) conducted	Polling organisation/client	Sample size	Lab	LD	SNP	Con	Green	UKIP	Others	Lead	
5–10 Jan 2015	Ashcroft	1,001	33%	4%	45%	5%	11%	1%	1%	Lead	12
6 May 2010	2010 general election	–	44.5%	31.3%	11.9%	7.1%	3.2%	–	2.0%	13.2	

==== Glasgow North East ====
Date(s) conducted	Polling organisation/client	Sample size	Lab	SNP	LD	Con	UKIP	Green	Others	Lead	
5–8 Jan 2015	Ashcroft	1,001	46%	39%	1%	4%	5%	4%	1%	Lead	7
6 May 2010	2010 general election	–	68.3%	14.1%	7.7%	5.3%	–	–	4.4%	54.2	

==== Glasgow North West ====
Date(s) conducted	Polling organisation/client	Sample size	Lab	LD	SNP	Con	Green	UKIP	Others	Lead	
7–17 Jan 2015	Ashcroft	1,000	38%	3%	44%	7%	5%	2%	1%	Lead	6
6 May 2010	2010 general election	–	54.1%	15.8%	15.3%	9.9%	2.5%	–	2.5%	38.3	

==== Glasgow South ====
Date(s) conducted	Polling organisation/client	Sample size	Lab	SNP	LD	Con	Green	UKIP	Others	Lead	
7–16 Jan 2015	Ashcroft	1,001	33%	48%	2%	9%	3%	3%	1%	Lead	15
6 May 2010	2010 general election	–	51.7%	20.1%	11.8%	11.5%	2.4%	–	2.5%	31.6	

==== Glasgow South West ====
Date(s) conducted	Polling organisation/client	Sample size	Lab	SNP	LD	Con	UKIP	Green	Others	Lead	
11–16 Apr 2015	Ashcroft	1,003	34%	55%	2%	6%	3%	1%	1%	Lead	21
7–15 Jan 2015	Ashcroft	1,000	42%	45%	2%	4%	5%	2%	1%	3	
6 May 2010	2010 general election	–	62.5%	16.3%	9.0%	6.6%	–	–	5.5%	46.2	

==== Gordon ====
Date(s) conducted	Polling organisation/client	Sample size	LD	SNP	Lab	Con	Green	UKIP	Others	Lead	
22–29 Jan 2015	Ashcroft	1,002	26%	43%	14%	11%	1%	4%	1%	Lead	17
6 May 2010	2010 general election	–	36.0%	22.2%	20.1%	18.7%	1.5%	–	1.4%	13.8	

==== Inverness, Nairn, Badenoch and Strathspey ====
Date(s) conducted	Polling organisation/client	Sample size	LD	Lab	SNP	Con	Green	UKIP	Others	Lead	
20–29 Jan 2015	Ashcroft	1,000	21%	13%	50%	10%	1%	4%	1%	Lead	29
23–26 May 2014	ICM/Oakeshott	500	16%	25%	32%	12%	4%	7%	3%	7	
6 May 2010	2010 general election	–	40.7%	22.1%	18.7%	13.3%	1.7%	1.2%	2.5%	18.6	

==== Kirkcaldy and Cowdenbeath ====
Date(s) conducted	Polling organisation/client	Sample size	Lab	SNP	LD	Con	UKIP	Green	Others	Lead	
19–26 Feb 2015	Ashcroft	1,000	39%	45%	3%	7%	3%	3%	0%	Lead	6
6 May 2010	2010 general election	–	64.5%	14.3%	9.3%	9.3%	1.7%	–	0.9%	50.2	

==== Motherwell and Wishaw ====
Date(s) conducted	Polling organisation/client	Sample size	Lab	SNP	LD	Con	UKIP	Green	Others	Lead	
14–22 Jan 2015	Ashcroft	1,000	39%	50%	1%	5%	3%	1%	1%	Lead	11
6 May 2010	2010 general election	–	61.1%	18.2%	9.8%	9.4%	–	–	1.6%	42.9	

==== North East Fife ====
Date(s) conducted	Polling organisation/client	Sample size	LD	Con	Lab	SNP	UKIP	Green	Others	Lead	
10–16 Apr 2015	Ashcroft	1,000	30%	16%	9%	43%	4%	1%	1%	Lead	13
6 May 2010	2010 general election	–	44.3%	21.8%	17.1%	14.2%	2.6%	–	–	22.6	

==== Paisley and Renfrewshire South ====
Date(s) conducted	Polling organisation/client	Sample size	Lab	SNP	Con	LD	UKIP	Green	Others	Lead	
7 May 2015	2015 general election	–	38.6%	50.9%	7.6%	2.2%	–	–	0.6%	Lead	12.3
11–16 Apr 2015	Ashcroft	1,005	39%	50%	6%	1%	2%	1%	1%	11	
22–29 Jan 2015	Ashcroft	1,000	40%	48%	6%	2%	1%	2%	1%	8	
6 May 2010	2010 general election	–	59.6%	18.1%	9.9%	9.5%	–	–	2.9%	41.5	

==== Ross, Skye and Lochaber ====
Date(s) conducted	Polling organisation/client	Sample size	LD	Lab	SNP	Con	Green	UKIP	Others	Lead	
9–15 Apr 2015	Ashcroft	1,000	33%	6%	48%	7%	3%	2%	1%	Lead	15
16–26 Feb 2015	Ashcroft	1,001	35%	9%	40%	8%	5%	2%	1%	5	
6 May 2010	2010 general election	–	52.6%	15.1%	15.1%	12.2%	2.2%	1.9%	0.8%	37.5	

==== West Aberdeenshire and Kincardine ====
Date(s) conducted	Polling organisation/client	Sample size	LD	Con	SNP	Lab	UKIP	Green	Others	Lead	
11–19 Feb 2015	Ashcroft	1,001	20%	25%	39%	10%	3%	2%	0%	Lead	14
6 May 2010	2010 general election	–	38.4%	30.3%	15.7%	13.6%	0.9%	–	1.1%	8.1	

==== West Dunbartonshire ====
Date(s) conducted	Polling organisation/client	Sample size	Lab	SNP	LD	Con	UKIP	Green	Others	Lead	
14–22 Jan 2015	Ashcroft	1,000	38%	47%	1%	6%	4%	2%	1%	Lead	9
6 May 2010	2010 general election	–	61.3%	20.1%	8.1%	7.7%	1.6%	–	1.2%	41.2	

=== Wales ===
==== Brecon and Radnorshire ====
Date(s) conducted	Polling organisation/client	Sample size	LD	Con	Lab	Plaid	UKIP	Green	Others	Lead	
27 Oct – 1 Nov 2014	Ashcroft	553	31%	27%	15%	8%	17%	2%	0%	Lead	4
6 May 2010	2010 general election	–	46.2%	36.5%	10.5%	2.5%	2.3%	0.9%	1.1%	9.6	

==== Cardiff Central ====
Date(s) conducted	Polling organisation/client	Sample size	LD	Lab	Con	Plaid	UKIP	Green	Others	Lead
19–22 Sep 2014	Ashcroft	542	24%	36%	17%	9%	9%	5%	<0.5%	12
6 May 2010	2010 general election	–	41.4%	28.8%	21.6%	3.4%	2.1%	1.6%	1.0%	12.6

==== Cardiff North ====
Date(s) conducted	Polling organisation/client	Sample size	Con	Lab	LD	Plaid	UKIP	Green	Others	Lead	
18–27 Jun 2014	Ashcroft	1,000	30%	41%	6%	7%	12%	3%	1%	Lead	11
31 Mar – 6 Apr 2014	Ashcroft	461	34%	41%	8%	7%	8%	1%	<0.5%	7	
6 May 2010	2010 general election	–	37.5%	37.1%	18.3%	3.3%	2.4%	0.8%	0.6%	0.4	

==== Carmarthen West and South Pembrokeshire ====
Date(s) conducted	Polling organisation/client	Sample size	Con	Lab	LD	Plaid	UKIP	Green	Others	Lead	
8–13 Dec 2014	Ashcroft	515	33%	29%	4%	16%	14%	3%	1%	Lead	4
6 May 2010	2010 general election	–	41.1%	32.7%	12.1%	10.4%	2.8%	–	0.9%	8.5	

==== Vale of Glamorgan ====
Date(s) conducted	Polling organisation/client	Sample size	Con	Lab	LD	Plaid	UKIP	Green	Others	Lead	
2–12 Feb 2015	Ashcroft	532	38%	32%	4%	12%	10%	3%	1%	Lead	6
6 May 2010	2010 general election	–	41.8%	32.9%	15.2%	5.5%	3.1%	0.9%	0.5%	8.8	

== Multiple constituency polling ==
Some polls are carried out in specified subsets of marginal constituencies. Most of the polls for Michael Ashcroft were compilations of polls in individual constituencies.

Date(s) conducted	Polling organisation/client	No of Seats surveyed	Incumbents by party	Sample size	Con	Lab	UKIP	LD	Green	Others
1–14 Dec 2014	Ashcroft	8	8 Con	8,000	36%	35%	14%	6%	5% (Note: Based on a mean of the (non-aggregated) shares of 3%, 9%, 3%, 3%, 3%, 5%, 3% and 7% in the eight constituencies)	2%
20–29 Nov 2014	Ashcroft	4	4 Lab	4,002	22%	37%	33%	5%	2% (Note: Based on non-aggregated shares of 3%, 2%, 2% and 2% in the four constituencies)	1%
15–24 Nov 2014	ComRes/ITV News	40	25 Con, 15 Lab	743	31%	39%	18%	7%	4%	<0.5%
2–27 Oct 2014	Ashcroft	12	12 Con	12,008	32%	35%	23%	5%	4%	1%
10 Sep – 3 Oct 2014	Ashcroft	11	11 Con	11,002	32%	38%	18%	5%	5%	1%
18–26 Sep 2014	ComRes/ITV News	40	25 Con, 15 Lab	766	30%	41%	17%	6%	5%	2%
31 Jul – 14 Sep 2014	Ashcroft	5	5 LibDem	5,000	15%	38%	10%	28%	6%	3%
31 Jul – 6 Sep 2014	Ashcroft	17	2 Con, 15 LibDem	8,909	32%	13%	17%	32%	4%	1%
11 Jul –11 Aug 2014	Ashcroft	8	8 Con	8,005	30%	40%	8%	17%	5%	1%
11 Jul –11 Aug 2014	Ashcroft	4	4 Lab	4,001	30%	43%	9%	13%	4%	1%
18 Jun –16 Jul 2014	Ashcroft	14	14 Con	14,004	31%	38%	4%	21%	4%	2%
18–25 Jun 2014	ComRes/ITV News	40	25 Con, 15 Lab	795	31%	36%	17%	7%	6%	3%
11–22 Jun 2014	Ashcroft	4	4 LD	1,963	12%	47%	10%	19%	9%	2%
11 May –14 Jun 2014	Ashcroft	17	6 Con, 11 LibDem	8,728	33%	14%	18%	28%	6%	1%
15–20 May 2014	ComRes/Independent	40	25 Con, 15 Lab	1,030	33% (−4)	35% (−2)	17% (+14)	8% (−10)	4%	2%
31 Mar –18 May 2014	Ashcroft	26	14 Con, 12 Lab	26,025	29%	41%	18%	8%		4%
1 Aug –5 Sep 2013	Ashcroft	40	40 Con	12,809	30%	35%	12%	13%		10%

== Explanatory notes ==
The Lord Ashcroft polls typically ask two voting intention questions, with the second question asking the respondent to think "specifically about your own constituency and the candidates who are likely to stand there". This latter question is reported in the tables above.

Most polling companies are members of the British Polling Council and abide by its disclosure rules; however, Michael Ashcroft, who commissioned many of these polls, is not a BPC member, despite having been invited to join. However, he contracts the conduct of his polls to BPC members.

== See also ==
- List of political parties in the United Kingdom
- List of United Kingdom by-elections (1979–2010)
