= 2014 Clacton by-election =

UK parliamentary by-election

- 9 October 2014

Clacton constituency
- Turnout: 64.2%
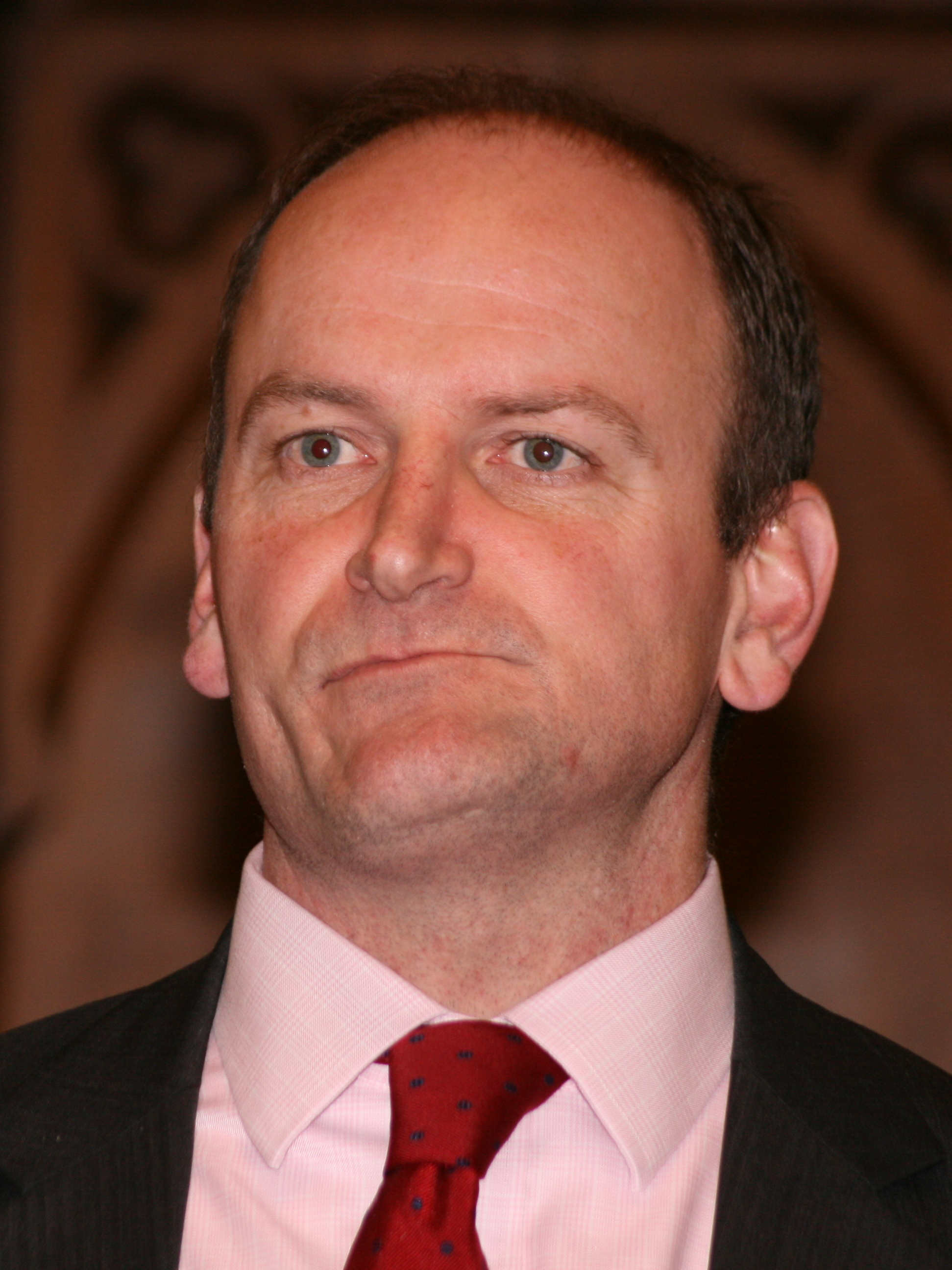

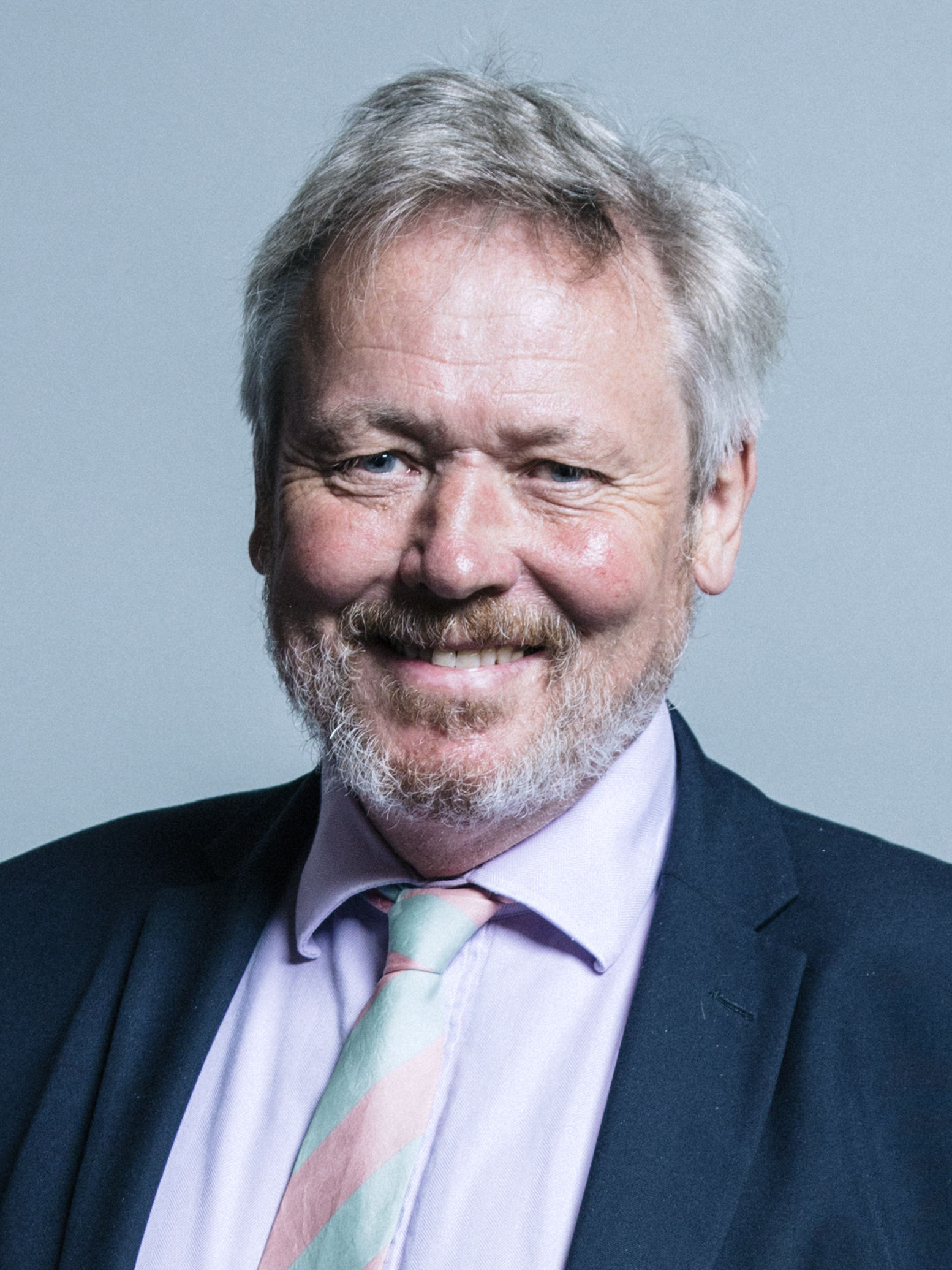

	First party	Second party	Third party
Candidate	Douglas Carswell	Giles Watling	Tim Young
Party	UKIP	Conservative	Labour
Popular vote	21,113	8,709	3,957
Percentage	59.7%	24.6%	11.2%
Swing	New	▼28.4 pp	▼13.8 pp
MP before election
Douglas Carswell
Conservative
Elected MP
Douglas Carswell
UKIP

A by-election for the United Kingdom parliamentary constituency of Clacton was held on 9 October 2014. It was triggered by incumbent Conservative Party MP Douglas Carswell defecting to the UK Independence Party (UKIP) and subsequently resigning his seat to seek re-election as its candidate. Carswell retained the seat with 59.7% of the vote, becoming UKIP's first elected MP.

The Conservatives came second, and Labour third. UKIP's result was the biggest increase in the share of the vote for any party in any by-election in history, according to John Curtice, professor of politics at Strathclyde University. A by-election in Heywood and Middleton was held on the same day.

== Background ==
On 28 August 2014, Douglas Carswell, a Eurosceptic Conservative backbencher, announced his defection to UKIP and said that he was resigning his seat in order to fight a by-election. He said he did not think Prime Minister David Cameron was "serious about the change we need", adding that "many of those at the top of the Conservative Party are simply not on our side" and "Of course they talk the talk before elections. They say what they feel they must say to get our support when they want our support, but on so many issues – on modernising our politics, on the recall of MPs, on controlling our borders, on less government, on bank reform, on cutting public debt, on an EU referendum – they never actually make it happen". He also said: "...local issues regarding planning and overcrowding of GP surgeries were a factor in my decision to resign".

Responding to the news that Carswell had defected and would trigger a by-election, Cameron said the contest would be held "as soon as possible". He also confirmed that the Conservatives would contest the by-election. It was later announced that the by-election would be held on 9 October. The poll was one of two parliamentary by-elections the same day, with an election also being held in the constituency of Heywood and Middleton following the death of its MP, Jim Dobbin of the Labour Party.

Analysis of demographics for the constituency prior to the by-election were said to make it the most UKIP-friendly in the country.

=== Previous result ===
UKIP did not stand a candidate against Douglas Carswell in 2010, citing his Eurosceptic views.

General election 2010: Clacton
Party	Candidate	Votes	%	±%
Conservative	Douglas Carswell	22,867	53.0	▲8.6
Labour	Ivan Henderson	10,799	25.0	▼10.9
Liberal Democrats	Michael Green	5,577	12.9	▼0.6
BNP	Jim Taylor	1,975	4.6	New
Tendring First	Terry Allen	1,078	2.5	New
Green	Chris Southall	535	1.2	New
Independent	Chris Humphrey	292	0.7	New
Majority		12,068	28.0	▲19.5
Turnout		43,123	64.2	▲1.6
Conservative hold		Swing	▲9.7	

=== Reaction ===
==== Conservative ====
Most Conservatives condemned Carswell's defection, but some were more supportive of his decision. Cameron called the resignation "deeply regrettable"; he also argued that it was counter-productive, on the grounds that only a Conservative government after the next general election could deliver a referendum on British membership of the EU – an argument echoed by many Conservative MPs, such as Mark Pritchard, Bernard Jenkin and Nigel Evans. A spokesman for the party said that the Conservatives would contest the by-election.

Evans also suggested, however, that the Conservatives should consider not standing in the by-election, which he called "a total distraction", while the backbencher Zac Goldsmith described Carswell as a "model Parliamentarian" and remarked that "I have nothing but admiration for him". The former Conservative minister Norman Tebbit refused to campaign against Carswell and said "[t]he House of Commons needs men of his quality".

Nick Herbert, a Conservative MP and former policing minister, criticised the Conservative Party for being, in his view, more concerned with the Clacton by-election rather than winning the Scottish independence referendum, which was held on 18 September 2014, during the Clacton campaign. During the campaign, on 27 September 2014, a second Conservative MP and close friend of Carswell's, Mark Reckless, likewise defected to UKIP and sought re-election in a by-election for his constituency of Rochester and Strood in Kent.

==== Other reactions ====
Labour Party leader Ed Miliband called Carswell's resignation "a blow for David Cameron", and said that it showed that the Conservative Party was divided. Bob Russell, the Liberal Democrat MP for Colchester (which borders the constituency of Clacton), stated that the resignation was a "huge embarrassment" for the party and that Carswell was "far to the right of the party".

UKIP's result was the biggest increase in the share of a vote for any party in any by-election in history, according to John Curtice, professor of politics at Strathclyde University.

== Candidates ==
=== UKIP ===
Carswell announced that he would stand again for the seat as UKIP's candidate, although he was opposed by the recently selected UKIP candidate, the councillor Roger Lord. Lord had previously contested three general elections as the UKIP candidate; North Essex in 1997, Colchester in 2001 and Braintree in 2005.

Some local activists speculated that they might not adopt Carswell; Anne Poonian, the secretary of the Clacton UKIP association, was quoted by BuzzFeed saying that, although she welcomed Carswell's decision to defect, he may not be selected. However, UKIP rules for selecting by-election candidates invested the decision with the party's National Executive Committee, which selected Carswell. Lord left UKIP and resigned his County Council seat, supporting the Liberal Democrats in the council by-election.

=== Conservative ===
There was speculation that Boris Johnson, the Conservative Mayor of London, would seek the candidacy at the by-election. On 29 August 2014, The Daily Telegraph journalist Peter Oborne wrote: "David Cameron should go down on his knees and beg Boris Johnson to stand as the Conservative Party's candidate for Clacton in the coming by-election." Two Conservative MPs, Matthew Offord and John Stevenson, wrote a joint article calling for Johnson to stand in the by-election. The bookmaker Ladbrokes offered odds of 33–1 against Johnson standing in Clacton. He ruled out standing, saying that he was intent on fighting Uxbridge and South Ruislip at the general election.

The Conservative candidate was the actor and Tendring District councillor Giles Watling who was chosen by an open primary, in which 240 local residents voted, on 11 September. He was shortlisted with Colchester councillor Sue Lissimore.

=== Other candidates ===
The Colchester councillor Tim Young was selected as the Labour candidate for the constituency in 2013 for the next general election, and became the party's by-election candidate.

The Liberal Democrat candidate, Andy Graham, was the former mayor of Bishop's Stortford in Hertfordshire, as well as an actor and author of children's books.

The Green Party candidate was the environmentalist Chris Southall, who had stood for the party in previous general and local elections. He gained some notoriety for a UFO hoax in the 1960s.

Alan "Howling Laud" Hope was the candidate for the Official Monster Raving Loony Party. He is also the leader of the party and the former mayor of Ashburton, Devon.

Charlotte Rose and Bruce Sizer were independent candidates. Rose described herself as a "high class courtesan" campaigning "for sexual freedom" and improved sex education in schools. Sizer was a consultant oncologist at Colchester Hospital who stood as a single-issue candidate to get health and cancer care onto the agenda of the political parties. He was Joint Clinical Director of the Essex Cancer Network from 2006 until 2008 and was an honorary research professor at the University of Essex.

== Campaign ==
The Conservatives were mocked by UKIP supporters for sending out a leaflet, called "The Big Clacton Survey" asking voters to prioritise issues including "local train and tube services", despite the fact that the nearest tube (ie London Underground) station to Clacton is over 50 miles (80 km) away. UKIP claimed to have recruited 150 local Conservative members following Carswell's defection.

The journalist and former Conservative MP, Matthew Parris, created a controversy by writing in The Times that the Conservatives should be "careless" of Clacton voters' opinions as "Clacton-on-Sea is going nowhere", remarks which were disowned by local Conservatives and denounced by Carswell as "reflective of what so many in the upper echelons of the Tory party really think" and were cited by two local Conservative councillors as a reason for defecting to UKIP.

An important component of the UKIP campaign was a public meeting of 700 people at the Clacton Coastal Academy with Douglas Carswell and UKIP leader Nigel Farage (who himself would go on to become the MP for Clacton in 2024), which was billed as the "biggest public meeting in Clacton in living memory".

Both the Prime Minister David Cameron and the Labour leader Ed Miliband visited the constituency to help their respective party campaigns.

Ten days before the election, the artist Banksy painted a mural on a wall in Clacton which showed five grey pigeons holding three placards. They held the words "go back to Africa" "migrants not welcome", and "keep off our worms". They were directed towards a more colourful migratory swallow perched further along the same wire. The mural was removed by Tendring District Council who had received a complaint that "offensive and racist remarks" had appeared on a wall.

Two days before the election, Boris Johnson was unable to remember the name of the Conservative candidate in the by-election during an interview with Nick Ferrari, saying "he's a superb man. Stirling? Girling? Something like that".

== Polling ==
Date(s) conducted	Polling organisation/client	Sample size	Con	Lab	UKIP	LD	Green	Others	Lead
9 Oct 2014	Clacton by-election result	35,365	24.6%	11.2%	59.7%	1.4%	1.9%	1.2%	35.1%
29 Aug – 1 Sep	Lord Ashcroft (for the 2015 general election)	1,001	27%	19%	48%	3%	3%	<0.5%	21%
29 Aug – 1 Sep	Lord Ashcroft (for the 2014 by-election)	1,001	24%	16%	56%	2%	1%	1%	32%
28–29 Aug	Survation (for the 2014 by-election)	700	20%	13%	64%	2%	1%	<0.5%	44%
6 May 2010	2010 general election result	43,123	53.0%	25.0%	–	12.9%	1.2%	7.8%	28.0%

== Result and analysis ==
By-election 2014: Clacton
Party	Candidate	Votes	%	±%
UKIP	Douglas Carswell	21,113	59.7	New
Conservative	Giles Watling	8,709	24.6	▼28.4
Labour	Tim Young	3,957	11.2	▼13.8
Green	Chris Southall	688	1.9	▲0.7
Liberal Democrats	Andrew Graham	483	1.4	▼11.5
Independent	Bruce Sizer	205	0.6	New
Monster Raving Loony	Alan "Howling Laud" Hope	127	0.4	New
Independent	Charlotte Rose	56	0.2	New
Majority		12,404	35.1	N/A
Turnout		35,338	51.0	▼13.0
UKIP gain from Conservative		Swing	▲44.1	

The election produced a number of statistical records, partly because of the unusual situation in which an incumbent MP with a large majority for one party has resigned and then stood for re-election on behalf of a new party for which support was in any case on a strongly rising trend. The 59.7% increase in the percentage vote achieved by UKIP since the previous general election (when they did not field a candidate) is the greatest ever in British parliamentary elections, although the percentage swing remains 0.1% less than the record 44.2% swing to the Liberal Party at the 1983 Bermondsey by-election. The 28.4% reduction in Conservative votes is the 16th worst for any party since the Second World War, while the 1.4% of the vote achieved by the Liberal Democrats was, at the time, the third smallest vote ever obtained by a major party, and the worst since World War II. Since then, however, the Liberal Democrats received an even smaller proportion of the vote at the Rochester and Strood by-election later in 2014.

== Aftermath ==
In November 2014, Mark Reckless won the Rochester and Strood by-election, giving UKIP a second MP. At the 2015 general election, Carswell retained his seat, becoming UKIP's only MP, though the party received 13% of the vote nationally (Reckless lost his seat to the Conservatives). Giles Watling was the Conservative candidate again, and came second in the constituency, 3,347 votes behind Carswell. The Conservative Party won an overall majority in the general election. In their manifesto, they had promised to hold a referendum on British membership of the European Union, which was held on 23 June 2016. The UK voted to leave the EU, with 52% of votes cast in favour of leaving.

In March 2017, Carswell left UKIP and became an independent MP. He did not stand in the 2017 general election, instead supporting the Conservative candidate in Clacton. In the general election, Watling won the seat for the Conservatives, with a large majority over the second-place Labour candidate (the UKIP candidate came third, receiving 8% of the vote). At the 2019 general election, Watling increased his majority further, receiving almost three-quarters of the vote.

== See also ==
- 2014 European Parliament election in the United Kingdom
- 2026 Clacton by-election
- List of United Kingdom by-elections (2010–present)
- Opinion polling for the 2015 United Kingdom general election
- Opinion polling in United Kingdom constituencies (2010–2015)
