= 2014 Rochester and Strood by-election =

United Kingdom by-election

- 20 November 2014

Rochester and Strood constituency
- Turnout: 50.6%
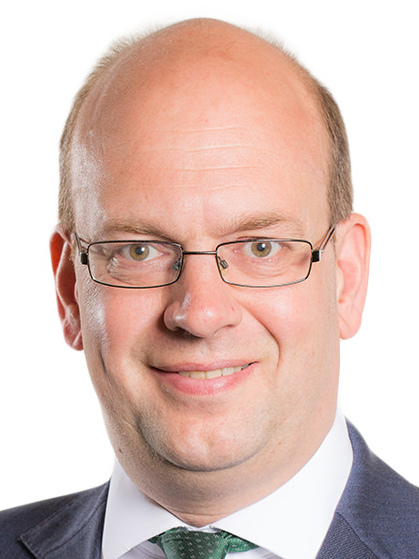

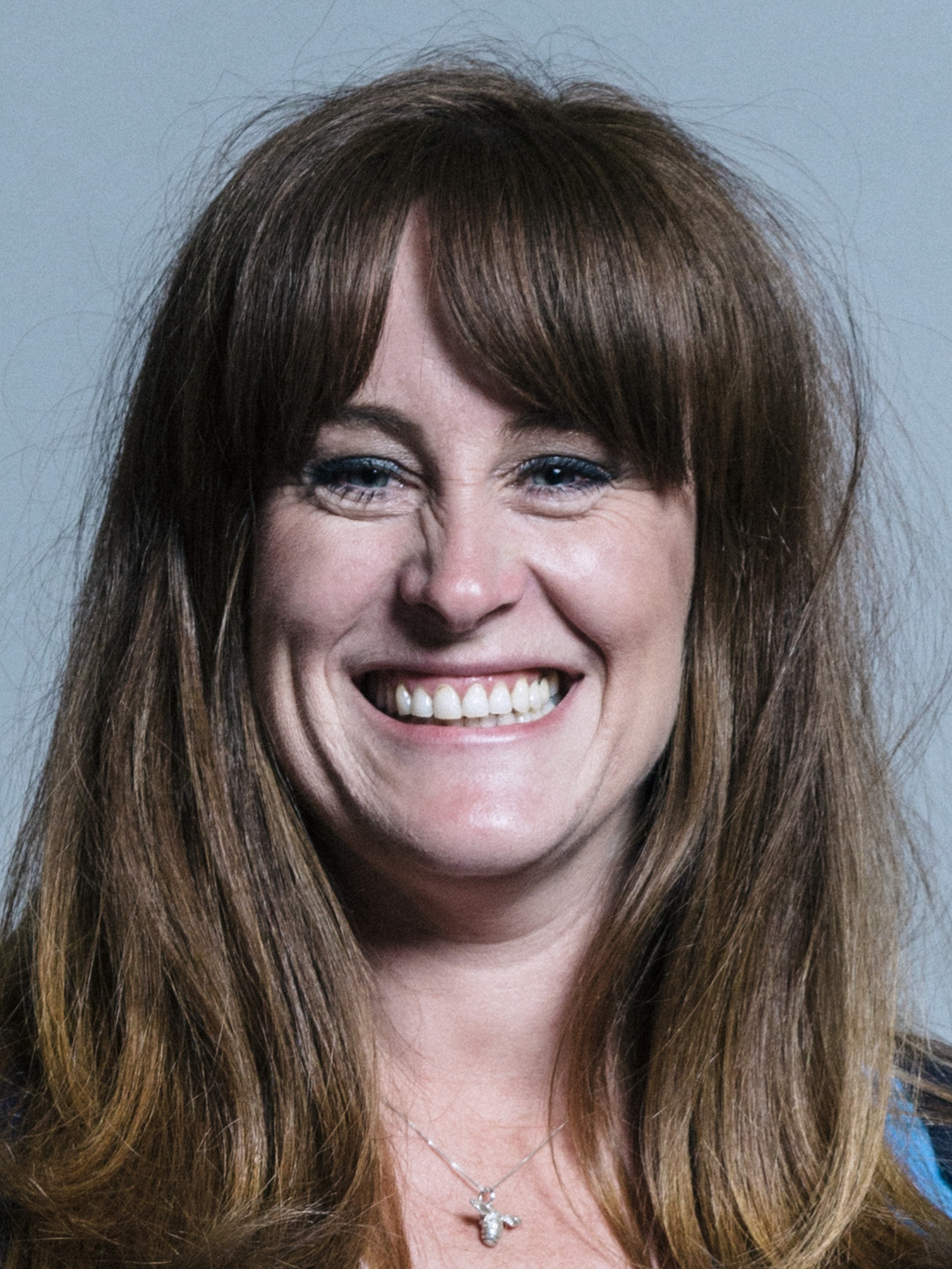

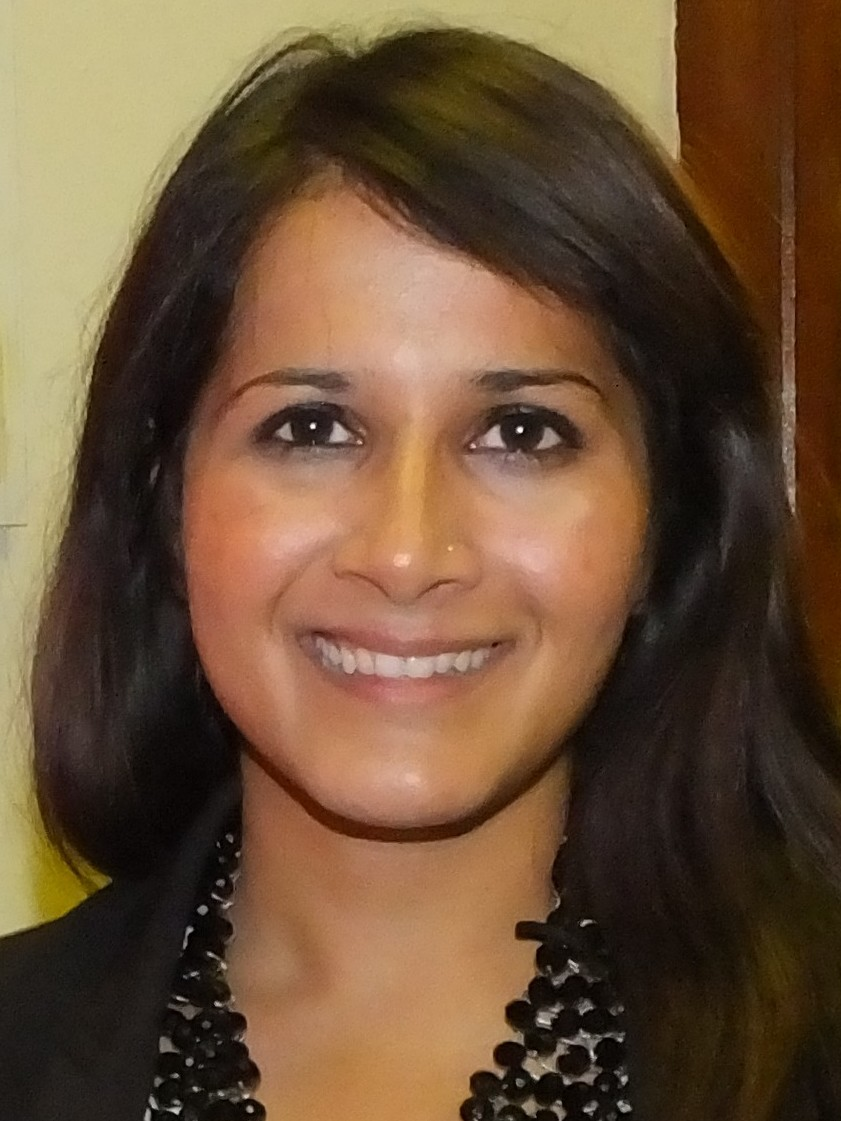
	First party	Second party	Third party
Candidate	Mark Reckless	Kelly Tolhurst	Naushabah Khan
Party	UKIP	Conservative	Labour
Popular vote	16,867	13,947	6,713
Percentage	42.1%	34.8%	16.8%
Swing	New party	▼14.4 pp	▼11.7 pp
MP before election
Mark Reckless
Conservative
Subsequent MP
Mark Reckless
UKIP

A by-election for the United Kingdom parliamentary constituency of Rochester and Strood was held on 20 November 2014. Incumbent Member of Parliament (MP) Mark Reckless defected from the Conservative Party to the UK Independence Party (UKIP) and resigned his seat to recontest it under his new affiliation. Reckless retained the seat, polling 42.1% of the vote.

The Conservative Party came second with 34.8%, and Labour third with 16.8%. The other ten candidates lost their deposits, including the Liberal Democrats whose 0.87% vote share was a record low for them, and the lowest ever for a party in government.

This was the twenty-first and final by-election of the 2010–2015 parliament.

== Background ==
The constituency comprised the cathedral town of Rochester, Strood, parts of Chatham, Brompton, St Mary's Island as well as the rural Hoo Peninsula and outlying villages.

Reckless's announcement followed that of his parliamentary colleague and close friend, Douglas Carswell, who defected to UKIP on 28 August 2014, resigning and subsequently being returned as MP for Clacton, in north Essex. On 27 September, at the UK Independence Party (UKIP) Annual Conference at Doncaster, which coincided with the eve of the Conservative Party Annual Conference, Reckless announced his plans to follow suit. Carswell won the Clacton by-election (on 9 October 2014) with 59.7% of the vote.

Reckless had previously been recognised as one of the most malcontent Conservatives in the House of Commons, having led a rebellion of 53 Conservative MPs over the Budget of the European Union which inflicted the first Commons defeat on the Conservative–Liberal Democrat coalition government.

== Candidates ==
Medway Council, who administered the election, published the statement of persons nominated on 24 October, confirming 13 candidates would contest the by-election.

Mark Reckless was the UKIP parliamentary candidate.

The Conservative Party fielded Kelly Tolhurst as its candidate selected by a postal open primary; Anna Firth was the other candidate, and both were serving Councillors: (Tolhurst representing Rochester West Ward on Medway Council, and Firth representing Brasted, Chevening & Sundridge Ward on Sevenoaks Council). The result of the primary was announced on 23 October, with Tolhurst winning narrowly with 50.44% of the vote. The Conservative Party reported that 5,688 voters took part in the selection process.

The Labour candidate, PR consultant and kickboxer Naushabah Khan, was selected in November 2013.

The Liberal Democrat candidate was Geoff Juby, a Medway Councillor who contested unsuccessfully the General elections of 2001, 2005 and 2010.

The Green Party candidate was Clive Gregory. His name was listed on the ballot as "Green Party – Say No To Racism".

Jayda Fransen, the deputy leader of Britain First, stood as her party's first parliamentary candidate. Her name appeared on the ballot with the description "Vote British!"

Hairy Knorm Davidson stood for the Monster Raving Loony Party, Nick Long for the Lewisham-based People Before Profit, and Dave Osborn for the Patriotic Socialist Party.

Four independent candidates also declared their candidature: Mike Barker, Christopher "JustQCharley" Challis, Stephen Goldsbrough, and Charlotte Rose. Barker was a former scientist at the Ministry of Defence whose campaign focussed of making the SS Richard Montgomery safe. Rose had stood in October's Clacton by-election in Essex, describing herself as "standing up for sexual freedom".

== Result ==
The results were declared at 04:15 UTC on Friday, 21 November 2014.

Reckless retained the seat (winning with his new party) with 16,867 votes, a majority of 2,920, with just over 42% of the vote (he received 49.2% of the vote as the Conservative candidate in 2010). This was the second highest UKIP vote share in a parliamentary election after the contest in Clacton the previous month, and represents a swing of 28.3% from Conservative to UKIP. (For a comparison with other high swings, see United Kingdom by-election records).

The Conservatives came second, with their share of the vote decreasing by 14.4 percentage points compared with the 2010 general election, and Labour's share decreased by 11.7 points.

The 4.2% polled by the Green Party was their best result since the 2010 general election, while the Liberal Democrats recorded their lowest vote share since their founding in 1988. It was also lower than any of their Liberal predecessors had polled since the First World War.

Rochester and Strood by-election, 20 November 2014
Party	Candidate	Votes	%	±%
UKIP	Mark Reckless	16,867	42.1	New
Conservative	Kelly Tolhurst	13,947	34.8	▼14.4
Labour	Naushabah Khan	6,713	16.8	▼11.7
Green	Clive Gregory	1,692	4.2	▲2.7
Liberal Democrats	Geoff Juby	349	0.9	▼15.5
Monster Raving Loony	Hairy Knorm Davidson	151	0.4	New
Independent	Stephen Goldsbrough	69	0.2	New
People Before Profit	Nick Long	69	0.2	New
Britain First	Jayda Fransen	56	0.1	New
Independent	Mike Barker	54	0.1	New
Independent	Charlotte Rose	43	0.1	New
Patriotic Socialist Party	Dave Osborn	33	0.1	New
Independent	Christopher Challis	22	0.1	New
Majority		2,920	7.3	N/A
Turnout		40,065	50.6	▼14.3
UKIP gain from Conservative		Swing	▲28.3	

== Campaign ==
The election was widely regarded as a key contest between UKIP and the Conservative Party. The Conservatives, being in Government and previous holders of the seat opted for a later election giving time for a longer campaign and to select its candidate by a local primary. There was discussion over whether the costs of the primary should be entered under the party's permitted election expense allowance, as UKIP argued, or not, as the Conservatives argued.

The election agent for Mark Reckless was Chris Irvine who was himself a Conservative Councillor on Medway Council representing Peninsula Ward at the time of Mark Reckless defecting. Irvine promptly resigned as a Conservative Party member on the news of the Reckless defection and sat as an independent councillor citing Medway Council's decision to approve planning permission to develop Lodge Hill as his primary reason for leaving. Irvine would subsequently resign his seat on Medway Council after joining UKIP to force a further local by-election in Peninsula ward to be held on the same day as the Parliamentary by-election. Irvine would become the first elected UKIP Councillor on Medway Council, taking just under 50% of the vote.

Michael Crick, of Channel 4 News, reported that the Labour Party was conducting a "token effort", because according to party sources, Labour claimed not to be able to afford a full electoral campaign. Rochester and Strood's predecessor seat, Medway, had been held for Labour by Bob Marshall-Andrews between 1997 and 2010. Marshall-Andrews had been elected despite his very different stance on immigration, telling a voter during the 2001 election campaign: "The difference between you and me is that you are a racist and I am not. [... ] And under no circumstances are you allowed to vote for me. You will not vote for me!"

The Royal Mail refused to distribute leaflets on behalf of Britain First, judging them to be in breach of laws regarding the sending of threatening mail.

The Conservative party have paid a fine without question to the Electoral Commission for misrepresenting their campaign expenditure in their financial returns.

Reckless produced a leaflet attacking the Conservatives for failing NHS patients, featuring a picture of him (taken when he was a Conservative MP) with Dr Phillip Barnes, Acting Chief Executive of Medway NHS Foundation Trust. The Trust's chair, Shena Winning, complained to UKIP, pointing out that public bodies cannot be associated with any politically biased information that could be seen to give any party an electoral advantage and that he had not asked permission to use the picture. Winning requested the leaflet be withdrawn and a public retraction issued.

At a hustings meeting on 18 November, televised by ITV Meridian, Reckless gave an answer to a question from the floor in which he appeared to suggest that EU migrants could, in future, be subject to deportation. UKIP leader Nigel Farage dismissed the remarks as a "minor confusion"; UKIP added it was not "the party’s policy to round up migrants and put them on a boat at Dover".

The by-election was dubbed 'The Battle for Rochester' following the media storm surrounding the defection of Douglas Carswell to UKIP in August 2014. The previous by-election campaign that was triggered by Carswell's defection became known as 'The Battle for Clacton'.

On polling day, Shadow Attorney General Emily Thornberry tweeted a picture of a house (in Strood) adorned with England flags with a white van parked outside, which drew accusations of liberal elitism including from her fellow Labour Party MP Simon Danczuk among others. Shortly after close of polls, Thornberry resigned from Ed Miliband's Shadow Cabinet in response to the controversy the tweet generated. The following day, Miliband described the tweet as conveying a "sense of disrespect".

== Polling ==
Date(s) conducted	Polling organisation/client	Sample size	Con	Lab	LD	UKIP	Green	Others	Lead
20 Nov 2014	By-election result	40,113	34.7%	16.7%	0.9%	42.1%	4.2%	2.1%	7.3%
7–10 Nov 2014	Ashcroft	543	32%	17%	2%	44%	4%	1%	12%
27–28 Oct 2014	Survation	1,012	33%	16%	1%	48%	2%	2%	15%
17–21 Oct 2014	ComRes	949	30%	21%	3%	43%	2%	1%	13%
4 October 2014	Survation/Mail on Sunday	677	31%	25%	2%	40%	1%	0.2%	9%
6 May 2010	General Election Results	47,971	49.2%	28.5%	16.3%	–	1.5%	4.5%	20.7%

== Previous result ==
General election 2010: Rochester and Strood
Party	Candidate	Votes	%	±%
Conservative	Mark Reckless	23,604	49.2	▲6.6
Labour	Teresa Murray	13,651	28.5	▼13.1
Liberal Democrats	Geoff Juby	7,800	16.3	▲3.9
English Democrat	Ron Sands	2,182	4.5	New
Green	Simon Marchant	734	1.5	New
Majority		9,953	20.7	▲19.7
Turnout		47,971	64.9	▲2.5
Conservative hold		Swing	▲9.8	

== See also ==
- 2014 European Parliament election in the United Kingdom
- List of United Kingdom by-elections (2010–present)
- 2015 United Kingdom general election
