= Rochester and Strood =

UK Parliament constituency (since 2010)

Coordinates: 51°24′N 0°30′E

- County constituency for the House of Commons
- Interactive map of boundaries since 2024
- Boundary of Rochester and Strood in South East England
- County: Kent
- Electorate: 72,155 (2023)
- Major settlements: Rochester, Strood, Chatham (part)

Current constituency
- Created: 2010
- Member of Parliament: Lauren Edwards (Labour)
- Seats: One
- Created from: Medway

Rochester and Strood is a constituency (Note: A county constituency (for the purposes of election expenses and type of returning officer)) in Kent represented in the House of Commons of the UK Parliament since 2024 by Lauren Edwards from the Labour Party. It was previously represented from 2015 by Kelly Tolhurst, a Conservative, who served as Government Deputy Chief Whip and Treasurer of the Household. (Note: As with all constituencies, the constituency elects one Member of Parliament (MP) by the first past the post system of election at least every five years.)

== Constituency profile ==
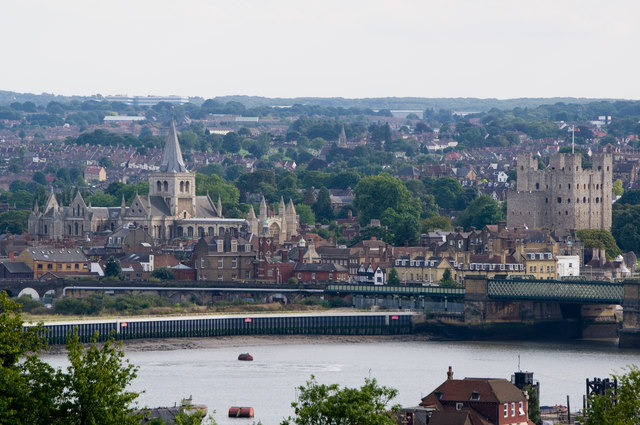
Rochester viewed from Strood. Rochester Cathedral (left) and Rochester Castle (right) are both visible.

Rochester and Strood is a constituency in Kent in South East England, within the Medway borough. It is named after its two main towns, Rochester and Strood, which are situated on opposite banks of the River Medway. The constituency also includes Chatham town centre, whilst the rest of Chatham lies outside this constituency. Other settlements in Rochester and Strood include the villages of Brompton, St Mary's Island, Cuxton, Halling, Chattenden, Hoo St Werburgh and Cliffe Woods.

The Medway towns have a maritime heritage. This constituency contains the former Chatham Dockyard, once the Royal Navy's foremost shipbuilding facility, which has now been redeveloped. Rochester is traditionally a cathedral city and Strood is a mostly suburban town largely built in the early 20th century. The constituency also covers the rural Hoo Peninsula which contains a large industrial area centred on the energy sector, including power stations and oil refineries. The constituency has overall average levels of wealth; there is some deprivation in Chatham where most residents live in dense flats or terraces whilst the suburban areas are more affluent. House prices are similar to the national average but lower than the rest of South East England.

Rochester and Strood has a low retired population and an above-average proportion of working-age adults with families. Residents have average levels of income and homeownership and the child poverty rate is below average. They generally have low levels of education and a high proportion work in the business administration and construction sectors. The percentage claiming unemployment benefits is in line with the overall UK rate. White people made up 86% of the population at the 2021 census.

At the local council, the Rochester, Strood and central Chatham are represented by Labour Party councillors. The villages on the outskirts of the towns and the newly-developed St Mary's Island elected Conservatives and the Hoo Peninsula is mostly represented by independents. Voters in Rochester and Strood strongly supported leaving the European Union in the 2016 referendum; an estimated 65% voted in favour of Brexit compared to the UK-wide rate of 52%.

== History ==
The Rochester constituency has ancient origins dating to the 16th century, but it has seen many changes in the 20th century. From 1885 to 1918 the wider area was split between Chatham, Gillingham and the "old", rural, Medway constituency. The Chatham seat joined Rochester to form Rochester and Chatham in 1950, which formed the core of Medway in 1983.

When the boroughs of Rochester upon Medway and Gillingham merged in 1998 to form, then confusingly, a unitary authority named Medway, the parliamentary constituency of Medway only covered part of the new borough, so in the boundary changes before the 2010 election the seat was renamed to more accurately reflect the area of Rochester and Strood which it now covers.

The seat of Rochester and Chatham, followed by Medway and then Rochester and Strood, had elected members of the party which won the popular vote in the UK at every election since 1959. This had meant that from 1959 to 2014 the area had always been represented by a member of the governing party, apart from the brief period between the February and October elections in 1974 (since Labour formed a minority government in February despite the Conservatives winning the popular vote).

In 2014, the sitting Conservative MP Mark Reckless defected to the UK Independence Party (UKIP), becoming the second MP in a matter of weeks to do so. Reckless resigned his seat, triggering a by-election in which he stood as the UKIP candidate. He won the by-election by just under 3,000 votes and became UKIP's second MP after Douglas Carswell. At the 2015 general election, Reckless was defeated by Conservative candidate Kelly Tolhurst, who had also fought the by-election. Tolhurst secured a majority of over 7,000 votes, meaning the Rochester area once again had an MP on the government benches.

Tolhurst retained her seat at the 2017 and 2019 elections with comfortable majorities, but was defeated by Labour's Lauren Edwards in 2024, maintaining the trend for the area's MP to be a member of the governing party.

== Boundaries ==
Map of boundaries from 2010 to 2024

=== 2010–2024 ===
The Borough of Medway wards of Cuxton and Halling, Peninsula, River, Rochester East, Rochester South and Horsted, Rochester West, Strood North, Strood Rural and Strood South.

=== Current ===
Further to the 2023 review of Westminster constituencies which came into effect for the 2024 general election, the composition of the constituency was reduced to bring its electorate within the permitted range by transferring the Rochester South and Horsted ward (as it existed on 1 December 2020) to Chatham and Aylesford.

Following a local government boundary review which came into effect in May 2023, the constituency now comprises the following wards of the Borough of Medway from the 2024 general election:

- All Saints; Chatham Central & Brompton (part); Cuxton, Halling & Riverside; Fort Pitt (small part); Hoo St Werburgh & High Halstow; Rochester East & Warren Wood (most); Rochester West & Borstal; St Mary's Island; Strood North & Frindsbury; Strood Rural; Strood West; and a very small part of Gillingham North.

== Members of Parliament ==
Election	Member	Party
2010	Mark Reckless	Conservative
2014 by-election	Mark Reckless	UKIP
2015	Kelly Tolhurst	Conservative
2024	Lauren Edwards	Labour

== Elections ==
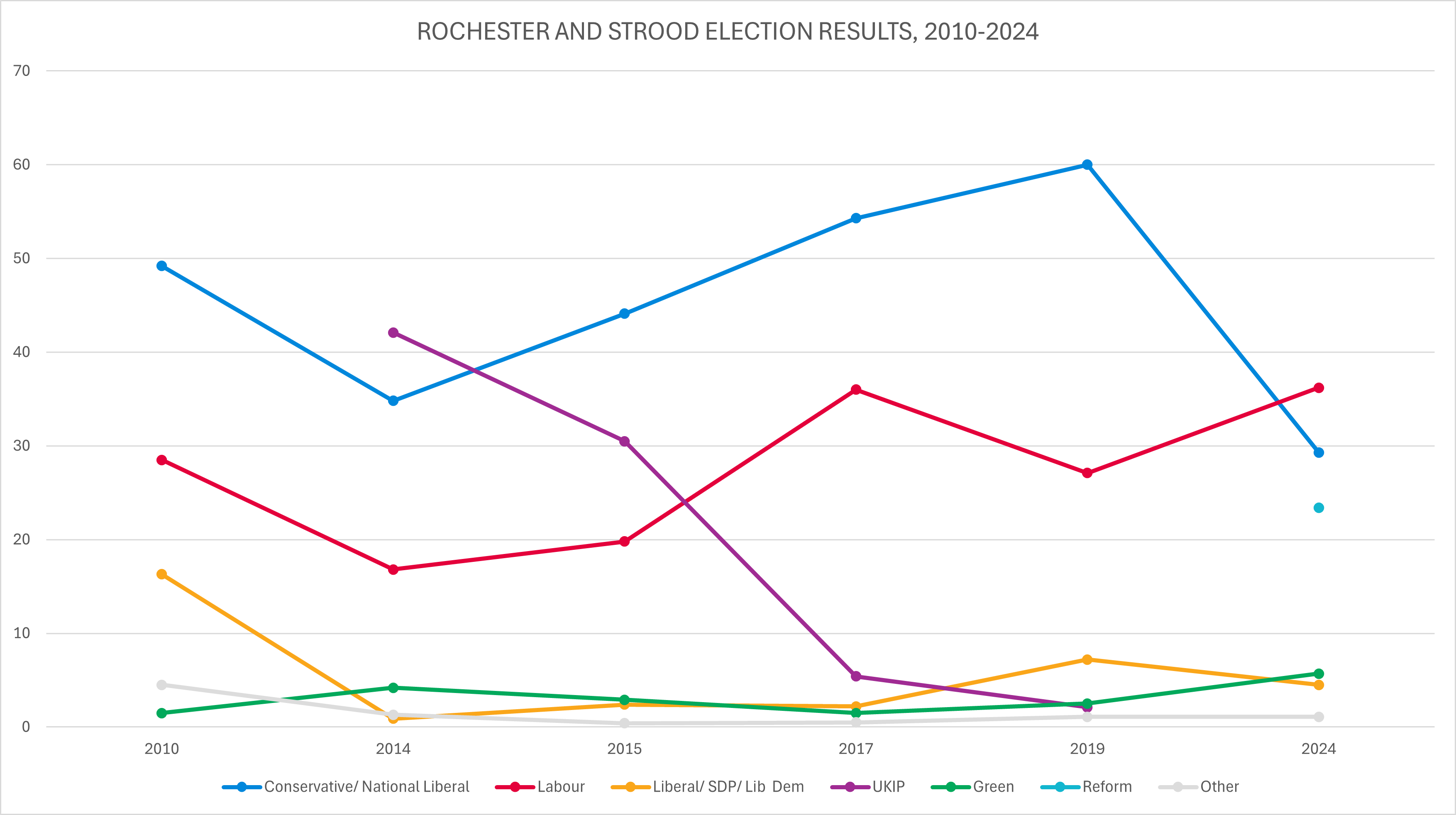
Election results 2010-2024

=== Elections in the 2020s ===
General election 2024: Rochester and Strood
Party	Candidate	Votes	%	±%
Labour	Lauren Edwards	15,403	36.2	+8.1
Conservative	Kelly Tolhurst	12,473	29.3	−29.2
Reform	Daniel Dabin	9,966	23.4	N/A
Green	Cat Jamieson	2,427	5.7	+3.1
Liberal Democrats	Graham Colley	1,894	4.5	–2.7
Workers Party	John Innes	245	0.6	N/A
Heritage	Peter Burch	190	0.5	N/A
Majority		2,930	6.9	N/A
Turnout		42,598	57.4	–4.5
Registered electors		74,257		
Labour gain from Conservative		Swing	▲18.7	

=== Elections in the 2010s ===
2019 notional result
Party	Vote	%
Conservative	26,098	58.5
Labour	12,545	28.1
Liberal Democrats	3,170	7.1
Others	1,667	3.7
Green	1,155	2.6
Turnout	44,635	61.9
Electorate	72,155	

General election 2019: Rochester and Strood
Party	Candidate	Votes	%	±%
Conservative	Kelly Tolhurst	31,151	60.0	+5.7
Labour	Teresa Murray	14,079	27.1	–8.9
Liberal Democrats	Graham Colley	3,717	7.2	+5.0
Green	Sonia Hyner	1,312	2.5	+1.0
UKIP	Roy Freshwater	1,080	2.1	–3.3
Independent	Chris Spalding	587	1.1	New
Majority		17,072	32.9	+14.6
Turnout		51,926	63.3	–1.8
Conservative hold		Swing	+7.3	

General election 2017: Rochester and Strood
Party	Candidate	Votes	%	±%
Conservative	Kelly Tolhurst	29,232	54.3	+10.2
Labour	Teresa Murray	19,382	36.0	+16.2
UKIP	David Allen	2,893	5.4	–25.1
Liberal Democrats	Bart Ricketts	1,189	2.2	–0.2
Green	Sonia Hyner	781	1.5	–1.4
CPA	Steve Benson	163	0.3	New
Independent	Primerose Chiguri	129	0.2	New
Majority		9,850	18.3	+4.7
Turnout		53,840	65.1	–1.4
Conservative hold		Swing	–3.0	

General election 2015: Rochester and Strood
Party	Candidate	Votes	%	±%
Conservative	Kelly Tolhurst	23,142	44.1	–5.1
UKIP	Mark Reckless	16,009	30.5	N/A
Labour	Naushabah Khan	10,396	19.8	–8.7
Green	Clive Gregory	1,516	2.9	+1.4
Liberal Democrats	Prue Bray	1,251	2.4	–13.9
TUSC	Dan Burn	202	0.4	New
Majority		7,133	13.6	–7.1
Turnout		52,516	66.5	+1.6
Conservative hold		Swing		

By-election 2014: Rochester and Strood
Party	Candidate	Votes	%	±%
UKIP	Mark Reckless	16,867	42.1	New
Conservative	Kelly Tolhurst	13,947	34.8	–14.4
Labour	Naushabah Khan	6,713	16.8	–11.7
Green	Clive Gregory	1,692	4.2	+2.7
Liberal Democrats	Geoff Juby	349	0.9	–15.4
Monster Raving Loony	Hairy Knorm Davidson	151	0.4	New
Independent	Stephen Goldsborough	69	0.2	New
People Before Profit	Nick Long	69	0.2	New
Britain First	Jayda Fransen	56	0.1	New
Independent	Mike Barker	54	0.1	New
Independent	Charlotte Rose	43	0.1	New
Patriotic Socialist Party	Dave Osborn	33	0.1	New
Independent	Christopher Challis	22	0.1	New
Majority		2,920	7.3	N/A
Turnout		40,065	50.6	–14.3
UKIP gain from Conservative		Swing	+28.3	

General election 2010: Rochester and Strood
Party	Candidate	Votes	%	±%
Conservative	Mark Reckless	23,604	49.2	+6.6
Labour	Teresa Murray	13,651	28.5	−13.1
Liberal Democrats	Geoff Juby	7,800	16.3	+3.9
English Democrat	Ron Sands	2,182	4.5	New
Green	Simon Marchant	734	1.5	New
Majority		9,953	20.7	+19.7
Turnout		47,971	64.9	+2.5
Conservative hold		Swing	+9.8	

== See also ==
- parliamentary constituencies in Kent
