= St Mary's Island, Kent =

Coordinates: 51.406434°N 0.545025°E

St Mary's Island
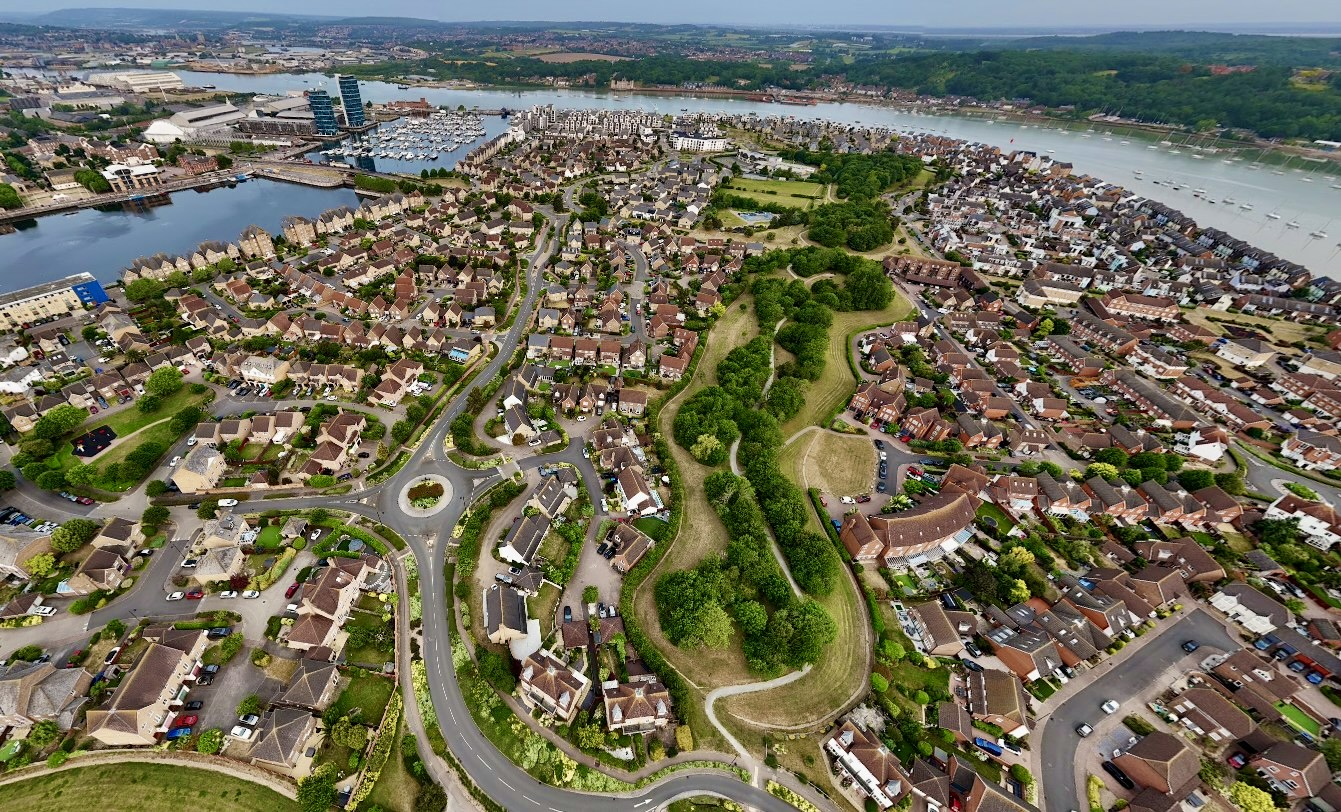
- A wide aerial view of St. Mary’s Island

- Location within Kent
- OS grid reference: TQ766706
- Unitary authority: Medway
- Ceremonial county: Kent
- Region: South East
- Country: England
- Sovereign state: United Kingdom
- Post town: CHATHAM
- Postcode district: ME4
- Dialling code: 01634
- Police: Kent
- Fire: Kent
- Ambulance: South East Coast
- UK Parliament: Rochester and Strood

St Mary's Island is part of the Chatham Maritime development area in Medway, South East England. It is located at the northern end of Chatham, adjacent to Brompton and Gillingham. Once part of the Royal Dockyard, Chatham, the area had consisted of a mixture of sports fields and warehousing during the later years of the Royal Navy's time in occupation.

St.Mary's Island is divided from mainland Chatham by three basins used by the dockyard.

== History ==
The Romans were the first people to use the Island. They constructed a road through the marshy swamp criss-crossed by tidal channels land, and established a ferry route from the Island to the Hoo Peninsula. The ferry was named 'Prince's Bridge' on early maps, it was used until the final years of the last century.

The 3 dockyard basins are sited on St Mary's Creek, which passed from the River Medway, near Gillingham to the River Medway (again) near Chatham. In 1575, the creek was blocked with stakes, as a defensive method against the Spanish forces. In 1585, a chain was placed across the River Medway, secured on the island and linked with a Wheelhouse at Upnor Castle. It would have been raised in times of danger. In the 1600s, a fort was built at the mouth of the creek, since the creek was now a passageway to the thriving dockyard. The fort had 54 guns of various calibres, but it has since been demolished. It was called Gillingham Fort. In 1663, Samuel Pepys mentions St.Mary's Creek, twice in his famous diaries, while travelling towards the dockyards.

A map of the dockyard in 1746, shows the marshland of the island, but it also shows a small mast pond, a reed house and timber storage land had been constructed on the north banks of the stream.

During the Napoleonic Wars, St. Mary's Island was used as a burial ground for the French POW's who died on the prison hulks moored in the Medway. The bodies of the prisoners were exhumed, and then re-interred in the grounds of St George's Church, now the St George's Centre (within the grounds of the Universities at Medway).

In 1847, 19 Acres was purchased by the Crown to enlarge the dockyard. Then in 1854, another 185 acres were purchased. This meant the whole of the island was now in the hands of the Crown and the dockyard.

Between 1854 and 1856, St Mary's Prison was built on the island. It had approximately 1,700 prisoners and staff of 232 (including 117 armed wardens). The prison was demolished in 1898.

In 1862, the dockyard was again re-modernised by engineer John Rennie the Younger. Most of the new work concentrated on St Mary's Island. Which had been recently purchased by the Admiralty for the new works. This included the three huge basins along the creek, linked by passageways. This shortened the time taken to reach the dockyard from Sheerness. A plan was also drawn-up for the bend of the river to be converted into a 50-boat basin. This was estimated to cost too much and was rejected. The spoil from the basins was spread across the island, filling the marshes. Also machine shops and 4 graving docks(a form of drydock) were built. Also a sea wall was built around the island, using convict labour. At one-time there were over 1 thousand prisoners working on the site.

A timber landing jetty was constructed beside the seawall, so that materials could be off loaded from ships. Blue Gault clay came from Burham and yellow sand from Aylesford. A 21-acre brickfield was also built on the northern end of the island for the docks. The brick earth came from the digging out of the basins. This was mixed with imported material. More than 23,000 bricks were made each week, and about 110 million bricks were manufactured overall.

Sixty-foot timber piles were driven into the marsh ground, to form the stable foundations of the basins. The excavated earth was then transported by tramways and spread over the island marshes. This subsequently raised the ground level, to approx. 6 ft above the high water mark at spring tide of the river Medway. Portland stone was shipped in and used to face the sides of the drydock.

While excavating, the remains of HMS Charles V ship were found, as well as several cannons. Two were restored and placed in the new dockyard. In 1871, the 1st phase of work was completed, but it took until 1885 for all the work to be completed. An official opening took place on 26 September 1885.

In 1940, during the Second World War, the island was used as a training ground for mock battles, which were staged against the dockyards. More than 2,000 incendiary devices were dropped on the dockyard during the war. In December 1940, a bomb hit a factory and caused the death of 8 workers and injured 63 others.

In 1944, an abandoned German submarine was towed by Royal Navy vessels and repaired in No.3 Basin.

== Re-development phase ==
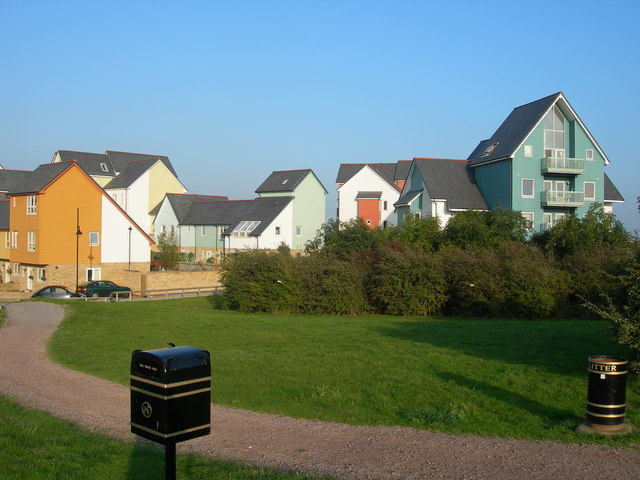
The fishing village houses of St Mary's Island

In 1984, the dockyard was closed. Its huge site was then broken up into three large zones. The largest zone was for the historic section of the dockyard, now the Chatham Historic Dockyard. The next zone (including St Mary's Island, and No 1 and No 2 Basins) was to be re-developed as residential and commercial accommodation. The final zone, of No.3 Basin and the lock gates, was taken over by the Medway Ports authority and is now a commercial port. It includes Papersafe UK and Nordic Recycling Ltd.

In the late 1990s, government agency English Partnerships and housing developer Countryside, came together to build homes on the island, under the development name Countryside Maritime. In due course, some parcels of land were allowed to be developed by other builders, including Redrow.

The first people to live on the Island following the redevelopment were Alan, Deborah and Michael Searles, who moved there in 1996. There is a plaque dedicated to them on the Island-side of the bridge with a Time Capsule buried underneath.

As well as several hundred new homes, there is a primary school and community church, a community centre, a doctor's surgery and a late-night pharmacy. There is extensive open space between housing parcels, as well as sports fields and play areas.

There are riverside walks and cycle paths on the island, and many of the paths in the middle of the island give views of the surrounding area.

There are no retail facilities on the island: those, and cafes and restaurants, are off the island. The Dockside Outlet Centre shopping precinct is within a twenty-minute walk. This includes a Co-Operative supermarket and The Ship and Trades public house (a Shepherd Neame outlet), while a short drive at Gillingham Pier is a large Asda. The western lock basin (Basin 1) now houses a marina.

Since 2008, with the growth of island community, Youth Club "The Island's Castaways" has been established, providing many activities for children. Also, for retired members of the community, there is St Mary's Island Active Retirement Association (SAINTARA) that is also successfully running since 2008. There is a thriving and influential residents' association (SMIRA) lobbying local authorities to ensure that the island remains an extraordinary place to live, work, study and play.

Recent developments include two large apartment blocks situated on the Marina. These will also house a gym and bar/restaurant.

The island is served Monday- Friday by the Arriva Southern Counties route 100 which provides links to Chatham Town Centre, the bus station and the railway station. On Saturdays, the island is served by route 100 operated by Nu-Venture. On Sundays, the island is served by route 151 operated by Nu-Venture.

== Wildlife ==
Many species of birds have been recorded on St Mary's Island, including European green woodpecker, greater spotted woodpecker and sparrowhawk. Redwings and cormorants are common visitors to the island in winter. Skylarks have been spotted in the summer in the meadows and heathland where there are plans to build more houses.
