= Charlotte Rose =

English sex worker, dominatrix, sexual trainer and political candidate

- Born: Nottingham, England
- Education: University of Plymouth
- Occupations: Sex worker, dominatrix, sexual trainer, political candidate, radio presenter
- Years active: 2013–present
- Known for: Sex work advocacy, political campaigning for sexual freedom
- Notable work: Rose Talks Sex (radio show)
- Television: Love for Sale, The Daily Politics, Things Sex Workers are Tired of Hearing
- Political party: Independent, Sexual Freedom Party
- Movement: Sexual freedom
- Children: Two
- Awards: Sex Worker of the Year (2013)

Charlotte Rose is an English sex worker, dominatrix, sexual trainer and political candidate from Nottingham, who lives in London. In 2013 she won the award of "Sex Worker of the Year" at the Sexual Freedom Awards where she is now a resident judge. In 2014 she took up politics, campaigning for sexual freedom as an independent candidate in the Clacton and Rochester and Strood by-elections.

== Career ==
Rose began her career in the sex industry at the age of 17 where she took part in a dominatrix-themed photoshoot. Rose married and became the mother of two children, an elder son and younger daughter. She became a teacher, but after separating from her partner she moved to Exeter, Devon in 2003. She gained a degree in hospitality from the University of Plymouth, and after working in the hospitality sector, taught the subject to further education students at Exeter College. She subsequently decided to become an escort. She became a vocal supporter of the sex industry. Rose also said that she wants to become Britain's number one sex guru.

In 2013 she won the "British Erotic Award for Sex Worker of the Year". In 2014 she appeared in the Channel 4 documentary Love for Sale, a series presented by Rupert Everett. Following this appearance Rose claimed she was the victim of a hate campaign, which resulted in her landlord evicting her and having to move to London. Rose claimed: "What other reason would it be apart from my profession? I don't do any harm, I don't make noise and I am just normal." In 2015 she appeared on an edition of BBC Two's The Daily Politics in which she argued for the decriminalisation of brothels in the United Kingdom. In 2017 she took part in Things Sex Workers are Tired of Hearing, a sketch for the online BBC channel BBC Three.

In 2015 Rose performed in a run of The Sex Workers' Opera at London's Pleasance Theatre. The show, which included elements of opera, hip hop and poetry to tell women's stories, went on its first UK tour in 2017. Rose is also the presenter of Rose Talks Sex, a long-running radio talk show discussing sex and sexual matters.

Rose stopped doing escort work following the death of her partner in a motorcycle accident in 2019. She then bought a motoring home and set herself a challenge to break a Guinness World Record by visiting 150 pubs across England, Scotland and Wales in 12 months. Shortly after she began her journey, her plans were curtailed by the COVID-19 pandemic, although she was able to continue on a smaller scale, visiting and reviewing pubs for her blog. She continues to present her radio show.

== Politics ==
In 2014 Rose began to stand in political elections, campaigning for sexual freedom. She has stood as an independent candidate, but the Sexual Freedom Coalition lists her as standing for the "Sexual Freedom Party".

Rose first stood in the Clacton by-election on 9 October 2014. Out of eight candidates she finished last, taking 56 votes (0.16% of the vote). Rose then stood in the Rochester and Strood by-election. Out of thirteen candidates Rose finished eleventh, taking 43 votes (0.11%).

On 12 December 2014, Rose organised a protest against the Audiovisual Media Services Regulations 2014 amendment to the Communications Act 2003. One of the practices banned was facesitting, so part of the protest was a mass facesitting with people singing "Sit on My Face" by Monty Python. On 1 March 2015 she organised a public spanking event at Manchester's Sackville Gardens, also as a protest against the legislation.

In 2016 Rose gave evidence to the Home Affairs Select Committee, which was looking at the way sex work is treated by legislation. The Committee backed calls to change the rules regarding brothel-keeping and completely decriminalise sex work, though no legislation has been brought before Parliament to act on their recommendations.
