= List of Kent County Cricket Club grounds =

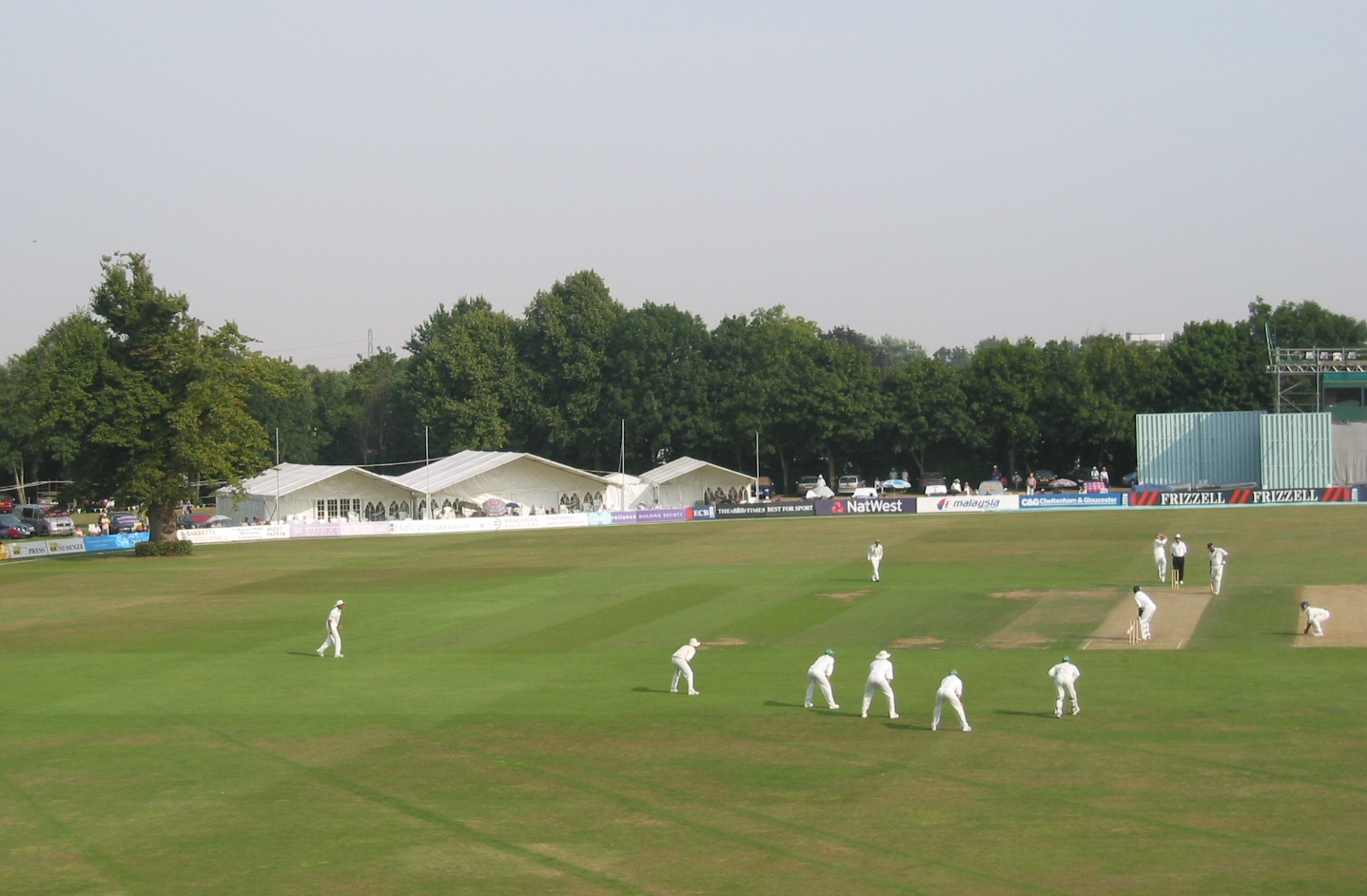
The St Lawrence Ground in Canterbury was unusual in having a tree of over 100 feet in height (visible on the left of the picture) within the boundary of the playing area. The tree blew down in a storm in 2005, and a much smaller replacement was planted at the same spot later that year.

This is a list of grounds that Kent County Cricket Club have used since the formation of the first county club in August 1842. The club has used 29 grounds for first-class, List A and Twenty20 home matches. Prior to the formation of the first county club an informal county team had appeared in first-class matches from 1773 and cricket had been played in the county from at least the 17th century.

White Hart Field in Bromley played host to the club's first home fixture in first-class cricket against an All England cricket team in 1842. The county was based at the Beverley Ground in Canterbury until 1846, and Canterbury Cricket Week was first established at this ground. From 1847 the base for the county moved to the St Lawrence Ground, also in Canterbury, and this ground was later established as the county's formal headquarters. It is now the main ground for the county and hosts the majority of home matches, although it was typically only used for county cricket during Canterbury week until well into the 20th century. The ground is famous for having a tree, the St Lawrence Lime, on the playing area for most of its history.

Unusually for a first-class county, Kent have played over 100 home fixtures at seven grounds and continued to play the majority of its matches away from the St Lawrence Ground until well into the 20th century. The only out-ground still in use as of 2024 is the County Cricket Ground, Beckenham.

The 29 grounds that Kent have used for home matches since 1842 are listed below along with The Oval in London, the home ground of Surrey County Cricket Club, which was used for two home matches by Kent.

== Grounds ==
Below is a list of grounds used by Kent County Cricket Club in first-class, List A and Twenty20 matches. Grounds are listed in order of their first use by the county. The count only includes matches where Kent were the home team. Many grounds have been used by other teams, including for international matches. (Note: Matches known to have been abandoned without a ball being bowled are excluded from the count.)

As of 24 September 2025

Name	Location	FC	LA	T20	First match	Last match	Refs
White Hart Field	Bromley	1 (Note: Another first-class match between Kent and England was played on White Hart Field in 1841 before the formation of Kent County Cricket Club in August 1842.)	0	0	25 August 1842 v England		
Beverley Ground	Canterbury	7 (Note: Three first class matches were played on the ground by Kent teams prior to the official formation of the first Kent County Cricket Club which took place at the ground during the 1842 Canterbury Cricket Week. The Gentlemen of Kent also played five first-class matches at the ground. Only the first-class matches played at the ground by Kent after the formation of the county cricket club are recorded in the table.)	0	0	13 July 1843 v Sussex	3 August 1846 v England	
Hemsted Park (Note: Some sources refer to the ground as Hensted Park. Contemporary reports, Benendon Cricket Club and Kent's own sources all call it Hemsted or Hempsted.)	Benenden	1	0	0	17 August 1843 v England		
Higher Common Ground	Tunbridge Wells	28 (Note: The North v South first-class fixture was played at Higher Common Ground five times between 1854 and 1883. One Married v Single first-class match as well as a first-class fixture involving a combined Kent and Sussex cricket team against an All England Eleven were also played on the ground. Only the first-class matches played at the ground by Kent are recorded in the table.)	0	0	31 July 1845 v Sussex	25 August 1884 v Somerset	
Preston Hall Ground	Aylesford	2	0	0	23 July 1846 v Surrey	15 July 1847 v Surrey	
St Lawrence Ground	Canterbury	616 (Note: Kent County Cricket Club sources do not include a number of matches played by the county in the 19th century where 13 or more players were included in the Kent team as first-class matches. These are not included in the count of matches in this list but are accepted as first-class matches by some sources and particularly effect the count of first-class matches played on the St Lawrence Ground.) (Note: A number of other matches have taken place at the St Lawrence Ground, including One Day International matches. Only the matches played at the ground by Kent County Cricket Club are recorded in the table.)	378	103	2 August 1847 v England	24 September 2025 v Derbyshire	
Bat and Ball Ground	Gravesend	142 (Note: The South played two first-class matches on the Bat and Ball Ground against the touring Australians in 1884 and 1886. Only the first-class matches played at the ground by Kent are recorded in the table.)	0	0	21 June 1849 v All England Eleven	26 May 1971 v Pakistanis	
School Field	Cranbrook	2	0	0	15 July 1850 v All England Eleven	24 July 1851 v All England Eleven	
Mote Park	Maidstone	218	53 (Note: Kent Cricket Board played five List A matches at Mote Park between 1999 and 2002. Only the List A matches played at the ground by Kent County Cricket Club are recorded in the table.)	2	23 June 1859 v MCC	5 June 2005 v Derbyshire	
New Brompton Cricket Ground	Chatham	1	0	0	12 June 1862 v Cambridgeshire		
Swifts Park	Cranbrook	2	0	0	24 July 1862 v Yorkshire	23 July 1863 v Nottinghamshire	
Sandgate Plain	Folkestone	2	0	0	31 July 1862 v Sussex	30 July 1863 v Sussex	
Crystal Palace Park	Crystal Palace	5 (Note: Crystal Palace Park later served as the home ground for London County Cricket Club in first-class matches between 1900 and 1904. Only the first-class matches played at the ground by Kent are recorded in the table.)	0	0	21 July 1864 v Nottinghamshire	25 August 1870 v Sussex	
New Cricket Ground	Margate	1	0	0	28 July 1864 v Sussex		
B. M. Close's Ground	Southborough	1	0	0	8 July 1867 v Hampshire		
Angel Ground	Tonbridge	106	0	0	22 July 1869 v Nottinghamshire	7 June 1939 v Glamorgan	
Private Banks Sports Ground	Catford	38	0	0	31 May 1875 v Sussex	29 June 1921 v Nottinghamshire	
Mount Field	Faversham	1	0	0	17 August 1876 v Hampshire		
Old County Ground	West Malling	4 (Note: Prior to the formation of the first Kent County Cricket Club in August 1842, Kent teams played ten first-class matches at West Malling between 1836 and 1841. Only the first-class matches played at the ground by Kent after the formation of the county cricket club are recorded in the table.)	0	0	3 June 1878 v Nottinghamshire	3 July 1890 v Sussex	
Foxgrove Road	Beckenham	14	0	0	22 July 1886 v Surrey	3 August 1905 v Surrey	
The Rectory Field	Blackheath	84	3	0	26 May 1887 v Gloucestershire	3 June 1972 v Surrey	
Nevill Ground	Tunbridge Wells	189	27 (Note: A One Day International was played at the Nevill Ground during the 1983 Cricket World Cup. Only matches played at the ground by Kent are recorded in the table.)	6	15 July 1901 v Lancashire	17 June 2019 v Notts	
Crabble Athletic Ground	Dover	106	4	0	11 July 1907 v Gloucestershire	21 July 1976 v Derbyshire	
Garrison 1 Cricket Ground	Chatham	3 (Note: The Royal Navy played two first-class matches here in 1929 against MCC and the Royal Air Force. Only the first-class matches played at the ground by Kent are recorded in the table.)	0	0	9 June 1926 v Derbyshire	14 May 1927 v Northamptonshire	
Cheriton Road	Folkestone	85 (Note: Several teams have played first-class cricket at Cheriton Road and Kent Cricket Board played a single List A match on the ground in the 2002 Cheltenham & Gloucester Trophy against Hampshire. Only the matches played at the ground by Kent County Cricket Club are recorded in the table.)	23	0	8 September 1926 v MCC	1 July 1995 v Cambridge University	
Garrison Ground 2	Gillingham	28 (Note: The Combined Services cricket team played two first-class matches here in 1949 against Kent and the touring New Zealanders. Only the first-class matches played at the ground by Kent where they were the home team are recorded in the table.)	3	0	5 May 1937 v Worcestershire	6 August 1972 v Leicestershire	
The Kent County Cricket Ground	Beckenham	8 (Note: West Indies A played India A in a first-class match at Beckenham in 2018. Only the first-class matches played at the ground by Kent are recorded in the table.)	21 (Note: A first-class counties XI played two List A matches against Pakistan Shaheens on the ground in 2025. Only the List A matches played at the ground by Kent are recorded in the table.)	23	9 June 1954 v Gloucestershire	4 August 2024 v Middlesex	
Hesketh Park	Dartford	33	2	0	16 May 1956 v Essex	8 August 1990 v Leicestershire	
Midland Bank Sports Ground	Beckenham	0	1	0	10 May 1970 v Lancashire		

=== The Oval ===
Kent have used The Oval, the home ground of Surrey County Cricket Club, for "home" matches on two occasions. The quarter-final of the 1981 Benson & Hedges Cup against Warwickshire was scheduled to be played on the St Lawrence Ground but, following heavy rain, the ground was deemed unplayable. Play was impossible on the first two days allocated for the fixture and an inspection on the third day also ruled out play and the match was switched to use The Oval at short notice.

The second Kent "home" match on the ground was a 2010 Twenty20 Cup fixture against Essex which Kent chose to play on the ground in an attempt to increase attendance and, as a result, income. The experiment was not repeated.

== Bibliography ==
Milton, Howard (2020). Kent County Cricket Grounds. Woking: Pitch Publishing. ISBN 978-1-78531-661-6
