= Garrison Stadium, Gillingham =

Sports venue in Gillingham, Kent, England

Garrison Stadium
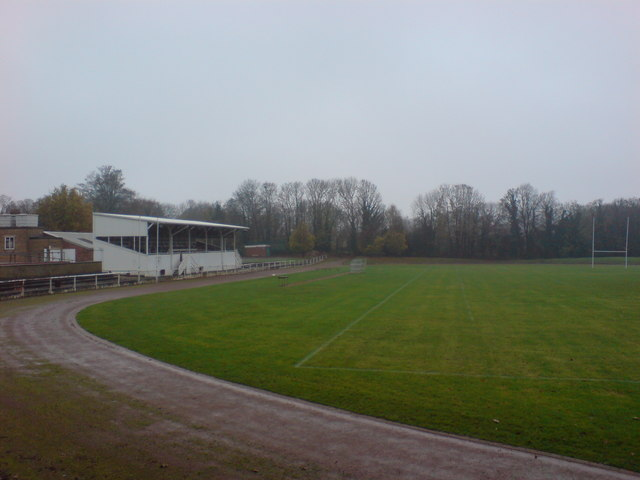
- The stadium in 2007
- Interactive map of Garrison Stadium
- Location: Gillingham, Kent
- Country: England
- Coordinates: 51.390°N 0.536°E
- Home club: Medway Dragons RLFC
- Capacity: c. 250
- As of 1 March 2018; Source: Running Track Directory

Garrison Stadium is a running track and sports field in Gillingham, Kent. The stadium has also been known as the United Services Sports Club, was built on land owned by the Ministry of Defence and was associated with the military establishments in the area such as Chatham Dockyard and Royal School of Military Engineering. The stadium is built on the area known as the Chatham Lines, an area of open space extending between Gillingham and Chatham.

A cinder running track runs around the stadium. This was used in the 1960s for athletics meetings and Kent county schools championships and from 1968 by the City of Rochester Athletics Club. The central area of the stadium was used for rugby league by the Medway Dragons. The club now uses the playings fields attached to the stadium which are also used for association football and field hockey and were used in the past for cricket.

Kent County Cricket Club used Garrison Ground 2, which was situated to the east of the stadium, for first-class and limited overs cricket matches between 1937 and 1972. The club has also used other pitches on the Chatham Lines, including Garrison 1 Cricket Ground and New Brompton Cricket Ground.
