= Brompton, Kent =

Village in Kent, England

Coordinates: 51°23′30″N 0°32′00″E

Brompton
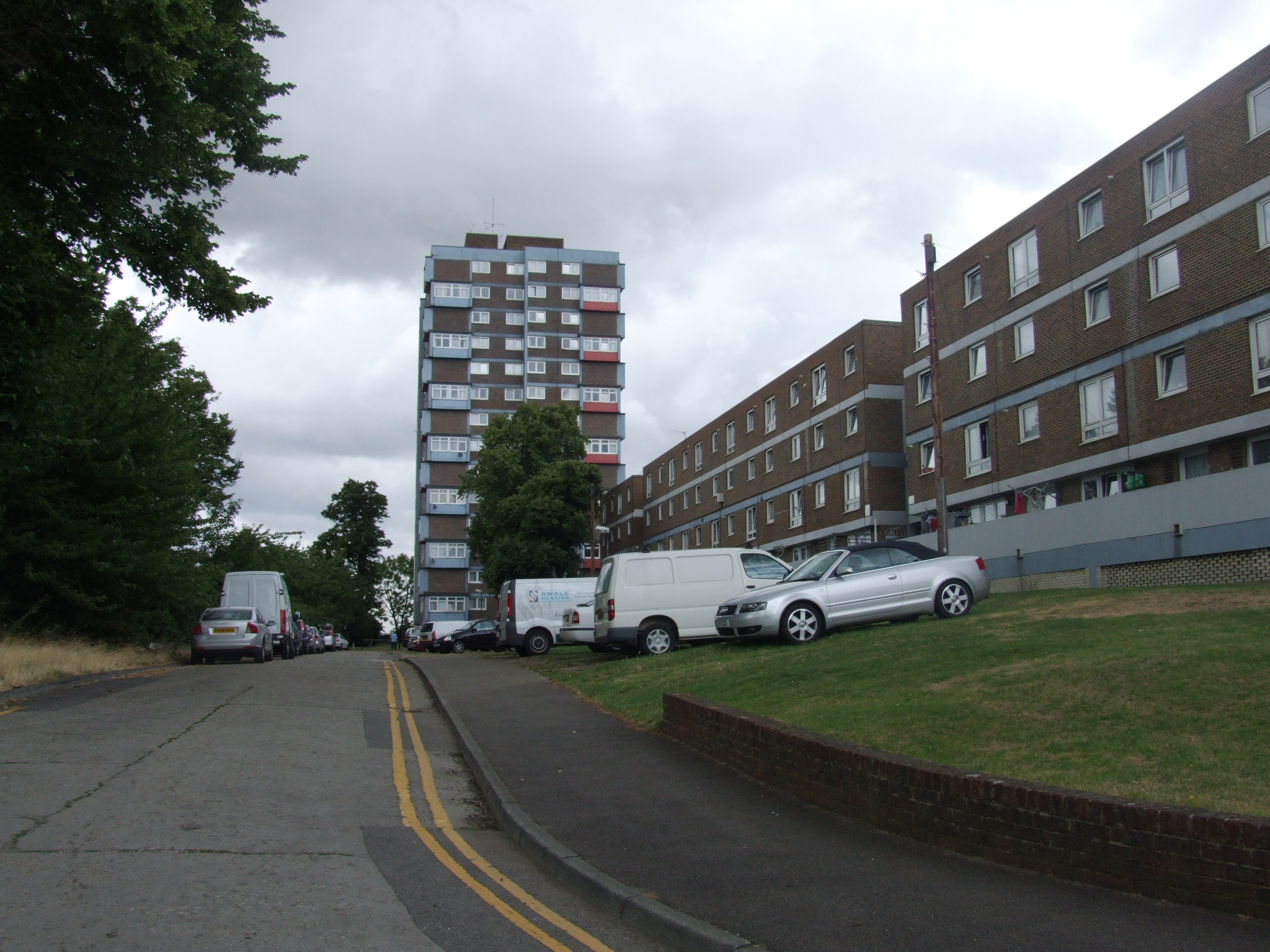

- Location within Kent
- Unitary authority: Medway
- Ceremonial county: Kent
- Region: South East
- Country: England
- Sovereign state: United Kingdom
- Post town: Chatham
- Postcode district: ME4
- Post town: Gillingham
- Postcode district: ME7
- Dialling code: 01634
- Police: Kent
- Fire: Kent
- Ambulance: South East Coast
- UK Parliament: Gillingham and Rainham and Rochester and Strood

Brompton is a suburban village situated between the town centres of Gillingham and Chatham, lying adjacent to Chatham Dockyard in Medway, Kent, England. Its name means "a farmstead where broom grows" — broom is a small yellow flowering shrub.

== Overview ==
Brompton dates back to the late 17th century, and grew rapidly in the 18th century to accommodate the fast-growing dockyard workforce. It was a deliberately planned settlement, laid out by Thomas Rogers, Esquire, the owner of Westcourt Manor on whose demesne lands it was built. In the 1750s, with the building of the Chatham Lines to defend Chatham Dockyard, the village became completely surrounded by military establishments, limiting its ability to expand much beyond its original plan. When war with France recommenced in 1778, it was necessary to strengthen the dockyard defences. Fort Amherst and the Chatham Lines (defensive ditches) were improved and extended, and work was later begun on additional perimeter forts in Chatham and Rochester. Brompton Barracks were built to house the soldiers. This, and the expansion of the dockyard, meant that more homes were needed for the workers. The position of the Chatham Lines meant that eventually building could only happen to the east of the defensive ditch, and so New Brompton came into being. The population rose to 9,000 by 1851.

From the 1850s, following the building of New Brompton & Gillingham Station, and the subsequent expansion of the town of New Brompton (Gillingham), the original settlement of Brompton became known as Old Brompton. From the late 19th century the importance of Old Brompton as a commercial center began to decline, finally being destroyed in the 1950s and 1960s when redevelopment by Gillingham Borough Council tore down the main 18th & 19th century shopping streets (High Street, Wood Street, Middle Street), replacing shops with council housing, leaving just a handful of shops at the southern end of the High Street. The closure of Chatham Dockyard in 1984 spelled the end for several of the shops and pubs that did manage to survive the Council redevelopments.

Gillingham Green was a small village; eventually it, too, was swallowed up, and the name of the whole settlement changed to Gillingham.

Officers' houses were built within the confines of the barracks and at Brompton where Mansion Row, Prospect Row and Garden Street now form part of the Brompton-Lines conservation area.

New Brompton was the name originally given to Gillingham station on the Chatham Main Line. New Brompton was the original name of Gillingham F.C. Founded in 1893 it changed its name in 1913.

Brompton Barracks has been home to the Royal Engineers since 1812, and now houses the Royal Engineers Museum. The Royal School of Military Engineering (RSME) is based at Brompton Barracks

Brompton is also part of the Chatham Dockyard World Heritage bid.

== Gallery ==
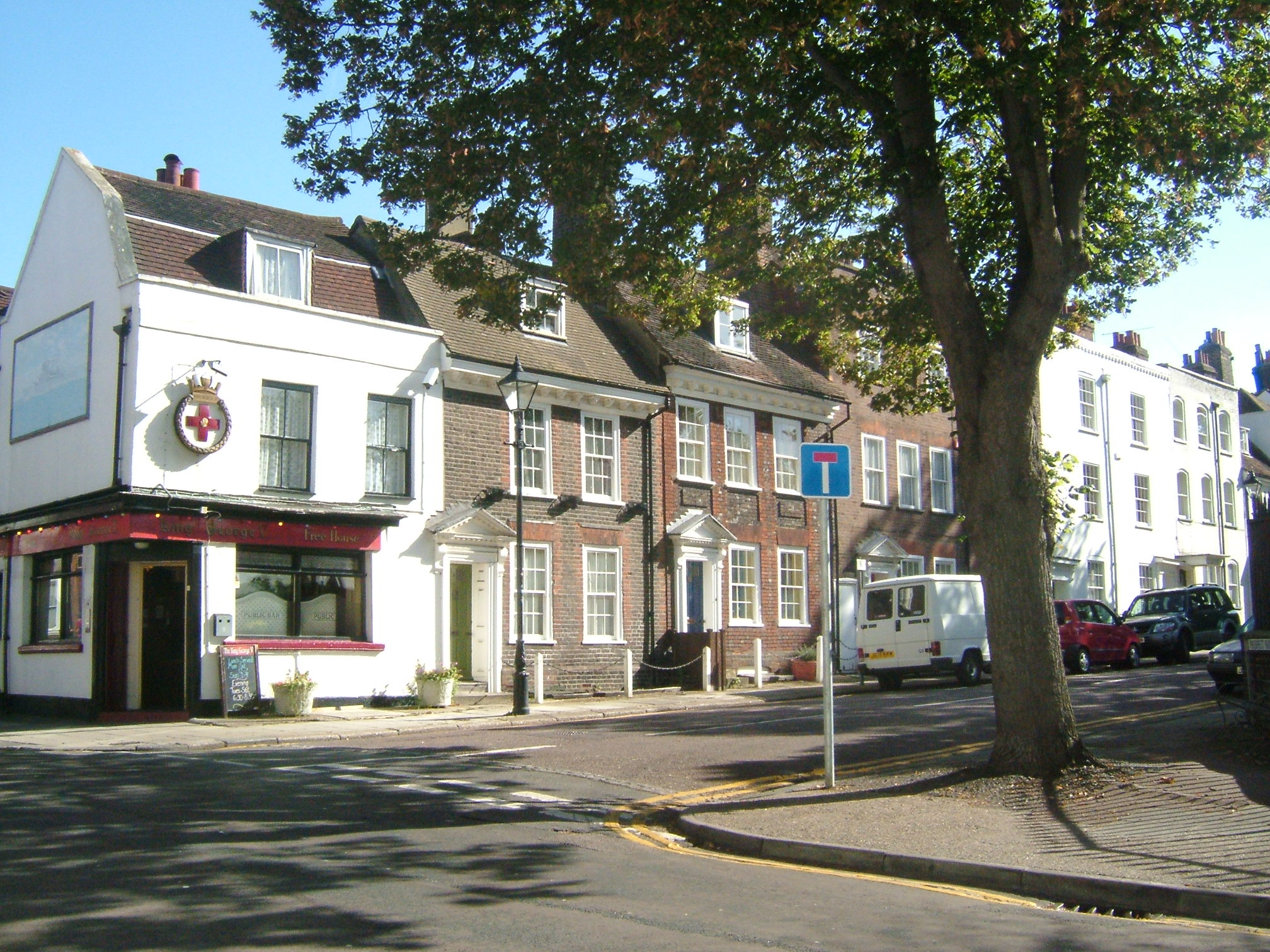
Prospect Row

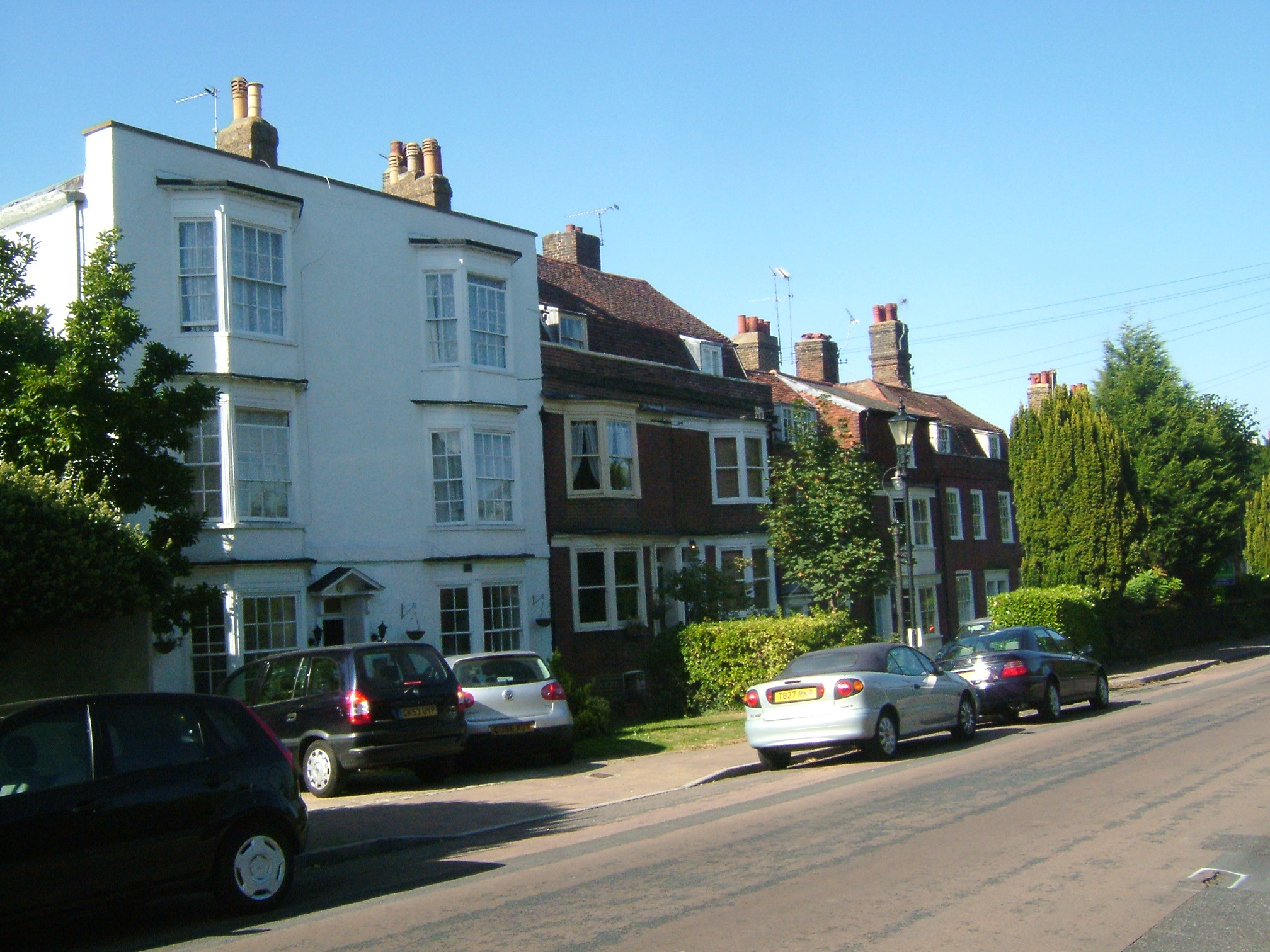
Mansion Row

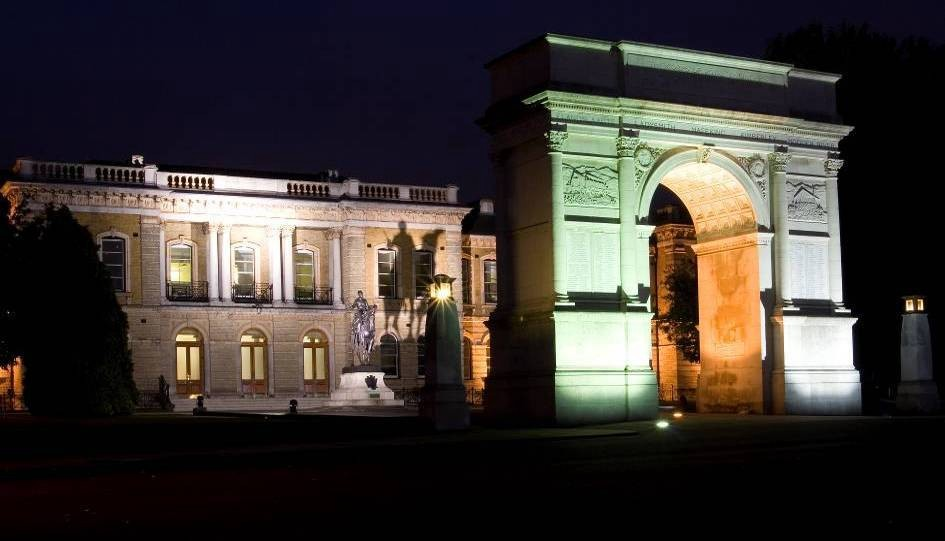
HQ Royal School of Military Engineering

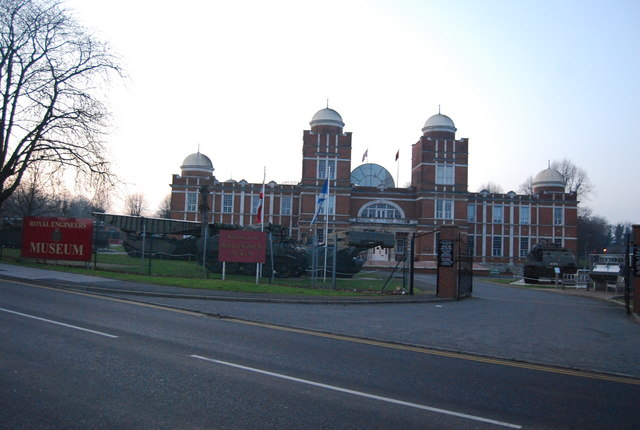
Royal Engineers Museum and Institution of Royal Engineers.

Showing Brompton and New Brompton, and their relationship to Chatham Dockyard, and the Lines

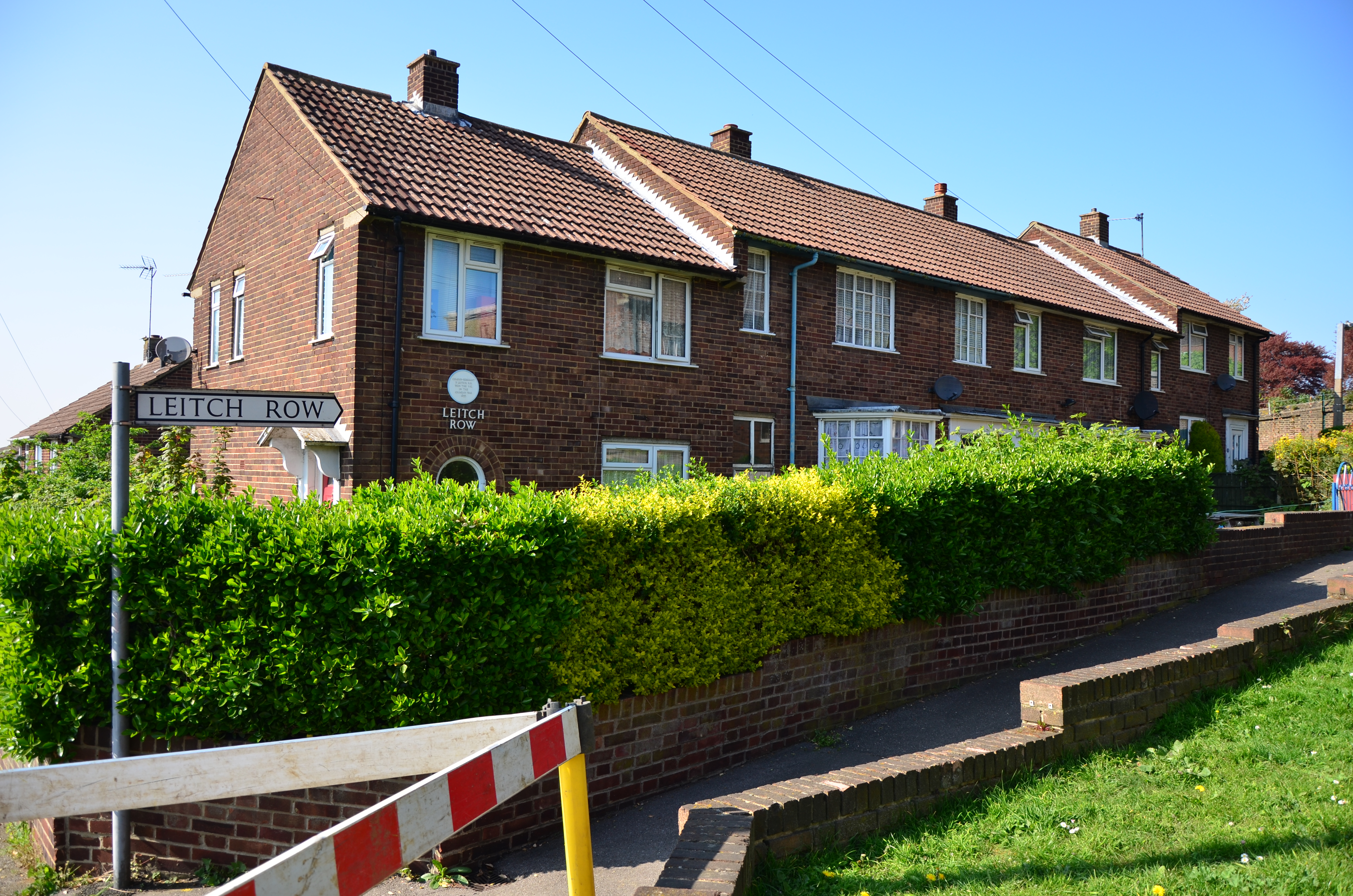
Row of post-war council houses on Leitch Row

== See also ==
- New Brompton Cricket Ground
- The Golden Lion, Brompton
