= Medway Park Sports Centre =

Sports venue in Gillingham, Kent, England

- Medway Park

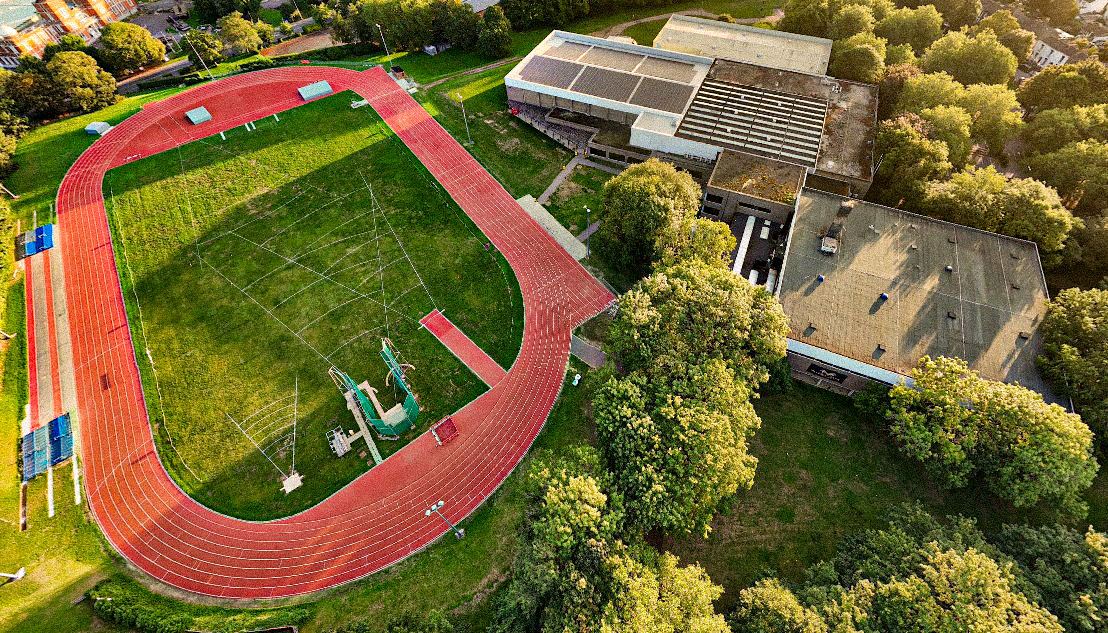
- Medway Park Sports Centre
- Interactive map of Medway Park Sports Centre
- Former names: Black Lion Leisure Centre (1973-2010)
- Address: Mill Road, Gillingham, Kent, ME7 1HF
- Coordinates: 51°23′24.5″N 0°32′29.1″E
- Owner: Medway Council
- Operator: Medway Sport
- Type: Sports and leisure complex
- Event: Multi-purpose sports venue
- Surface: Various (indoor flooring, athletics track, swimming pool)
- Public transit: Gillingham Railway Station

Construction
- Opened: 14 December 1973; 52 years ago
- Renovated: 2010
- Cost: £11 million (2010 renovation)

Website
- www.medway.gov.uk/medwaypark

Medway Park Sports Centre is a sports facility located in Gillingham, Kent, England. It opened on 14 December 1973 as the Black Lion Leisure Centre. The centre has undergone several renovations, notably a £11 million expansion in 2010 prior to it being reopened as Medway Park Sports Centre on 28 July 2011. Medway Park is used for recreational sports and fitness activities and has hosted national and international sporting events including the 2011 European Modern Pentathlon Championships and the 2013 Wheelchair Rugby League World Cup.

== History ==
Aerial view of Black Lion Field in Gillingham, Kent, from the 1960s

The development of the centre dates back to 1955, when it was first proposed by the three councils, including Gillingham Borough Council, that preceded Medway Council. In 1963, the possibility of using Black Lion Field for the project was raised, and construction was completed a decade later.

The Black Lion Leisure Centre officially opened on 14 December 1973 by Roger Bannister. The centre initially featured a swimming pool which was used by 1,705 swimmers on it opening weekend. In 1979, the centre expanded with the addition of a sports hall, squash courts, a snooker room, and a gym, officially opened by the Duke of Kent.

The previous year, the Black Lion Skatepark had opened on part of the Black Lion Field to the north of the sports centre. The skatepark, which featured a half-pipe and several concrete bowls, was used for BMX and skateboarding until it was closed in 1987.

During the 1980s, the centre hosted high-profile events, including the Norwich Union Grand Prix table tennis championship, the Butterfly Grand Prix, the English Closed Table Tennis Championships, and performances by the Royal Shakespeare Company, including Richard III.

The 1990s saw further development with improvements to gym facilities and the addition activities like archery proved popular as by 1993/1994, the centre attracted 487,598 visits.

In 2007, Medway Council announced a major redevelopment programme that included the construction of larger sports halls, a judo centre, new gym facilities and an Olympic-standard athletics track on an area of Black Lion Field to the west of the original leisure centre. The expansion was completed in early 2010, and in April 2010 the centre hosted a stage of the Modern Pentathlon World Cup.

The facility was officially renamed Medway Park Sports Centre and opened on 28 July 2011 by HRH Princess Anne, who also unveiled a commemorative plaque at the venue. The ceremony took place on the opening day of the 2011 European Modern Pentathlon Championships which was being held at the venue.

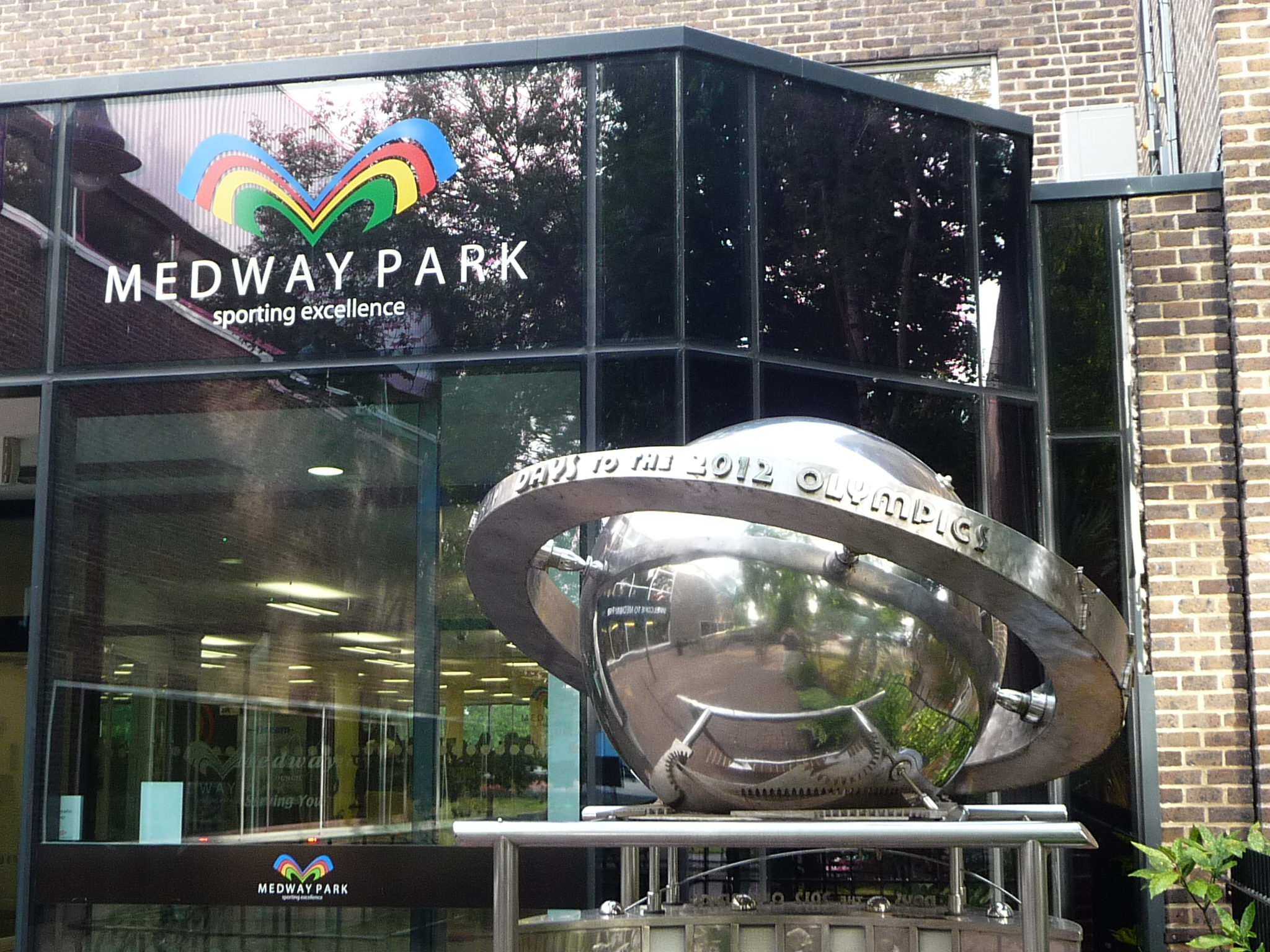
A stainless steel sculpture, Olympic Countdown Clock, beside the entrance to the sports centre

In 2012, Medway Park became a training site for 13 Olympic and 8 Paralympic sports in the lead-up to the 2012 London Olympics.

In March 2012, the Medway Dragons launched their wheelchair rugby league team at Medway Park. Later that month, the venue hosted a 12-hour-long match between Medway Dragons and the London Broncos foundation setting a world record for the longest wheelchair rugby league match. Medway Park was first used for international wheelchair rugby league in August 2012 when it hosted the inaugural Fassolette-Kielty Trophy match between England and France. The following year Medway Park was the host venue for the 2013 World Cup, held as part of the 2013 Festival of World Cups. In 2014, it was the venue for the Four Nations tournament, and in 2015 it hosted the Fassolette-Kielty Trophy and the Wheelchair Rugby League European Championship.

Following the COVID-19 pandemic, Medway Park played a vital role in the local community, first becoming an emergency shopping hub and later serving as the largest local COVID Test Centre.

In November 2021, Medway Park was the venue for a wheelchair rugby league two-test series between England and France.

In 2022, the centre hosted the David Ward Hunt Cup International Trampoline Championship. In 2023, it was the venue for the IFAA World Indoor Archery Championships and in 2024 the centre hosted the International Dance Championship.

In October 2024, Medway Council approved plans to reinvest a £1.5 million underspend from the construction of Cozenton Park Sports Centre into refurbishment works at Medway Park.

== Gallery of Medway Park Sports Centre ==
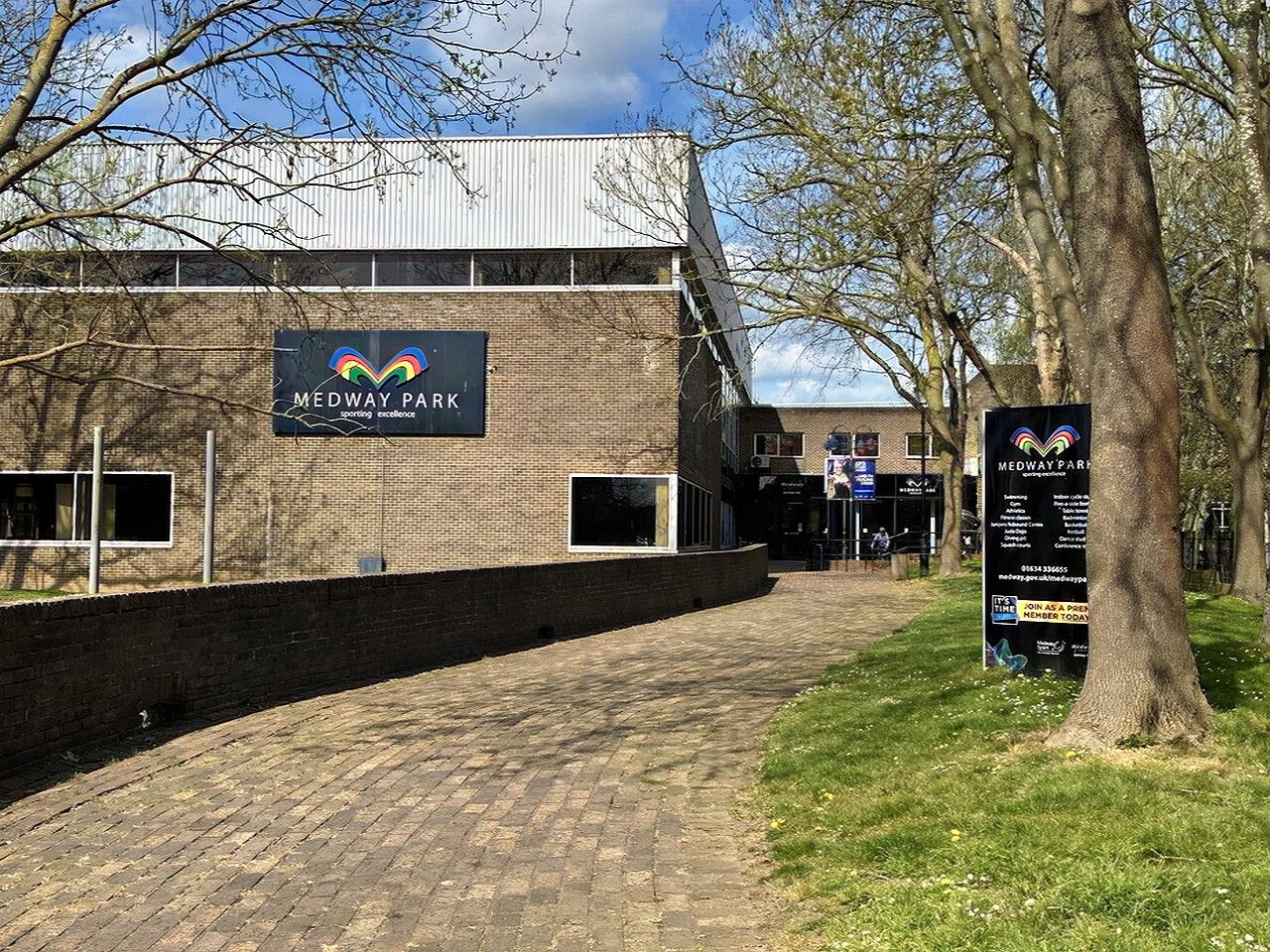
The entrance to Medway Park Sports Centre by Mill Road - April 2025

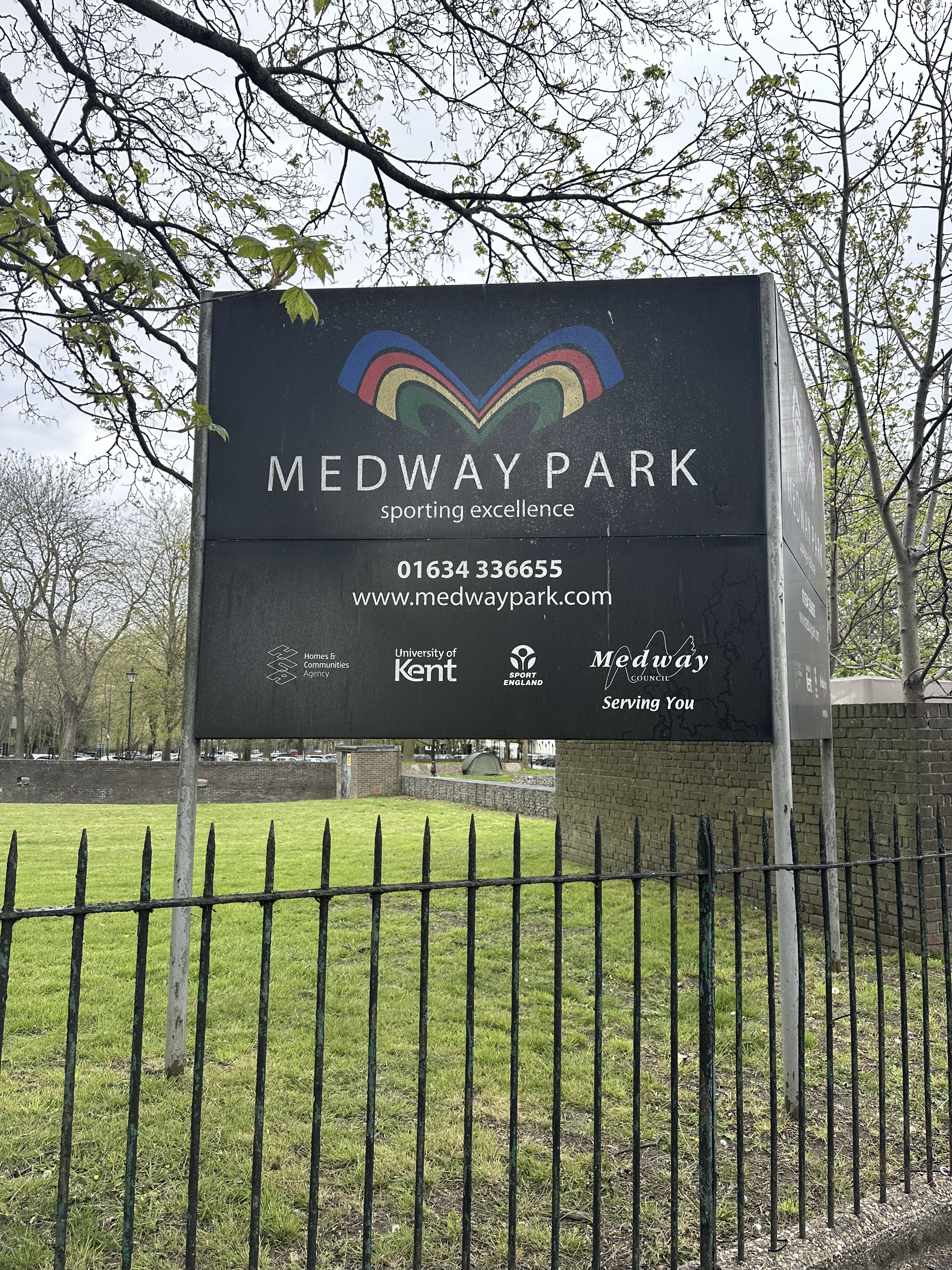
Welcome sign for the sports centre

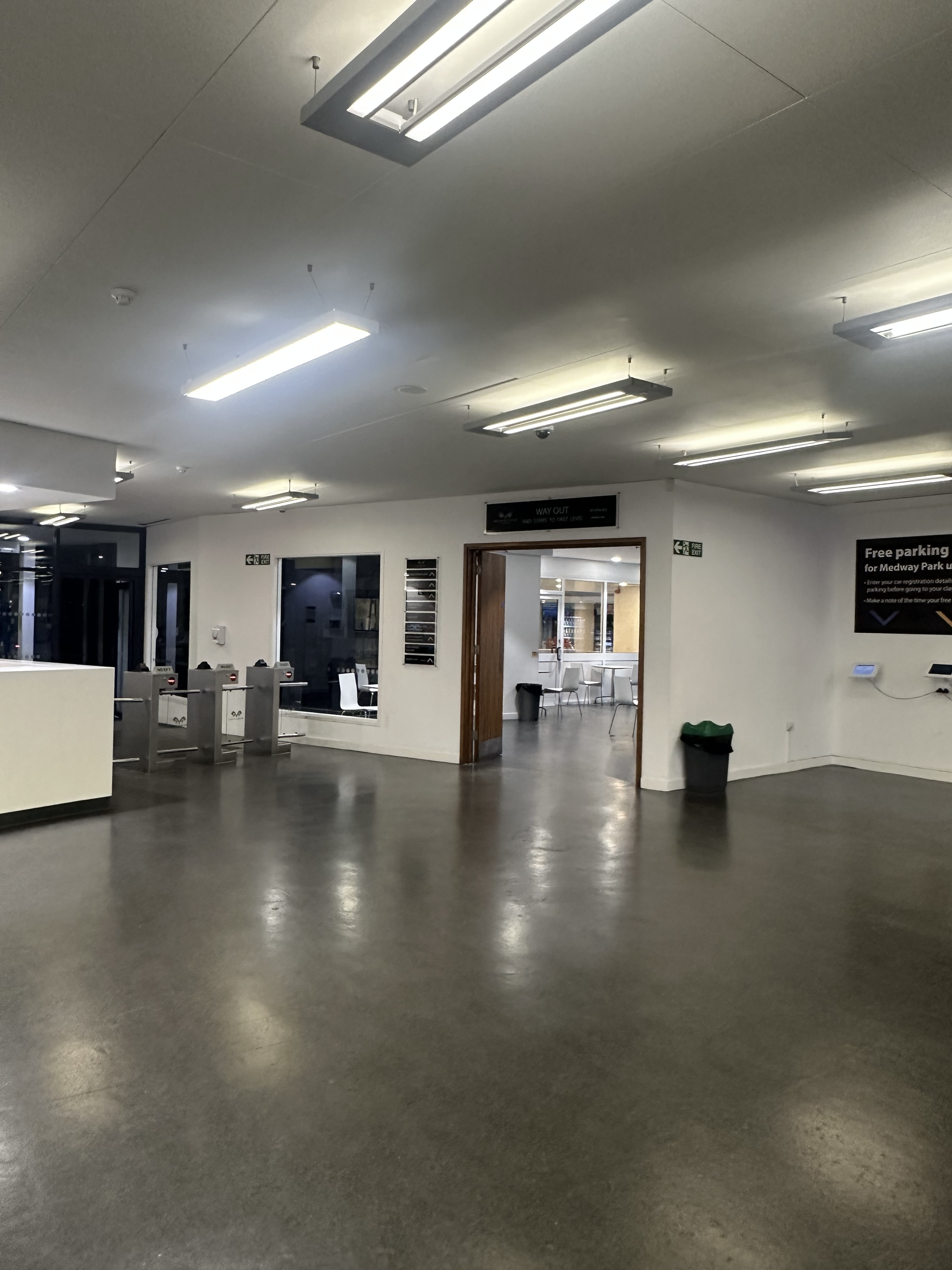
The reception/lobby area of the sports centre

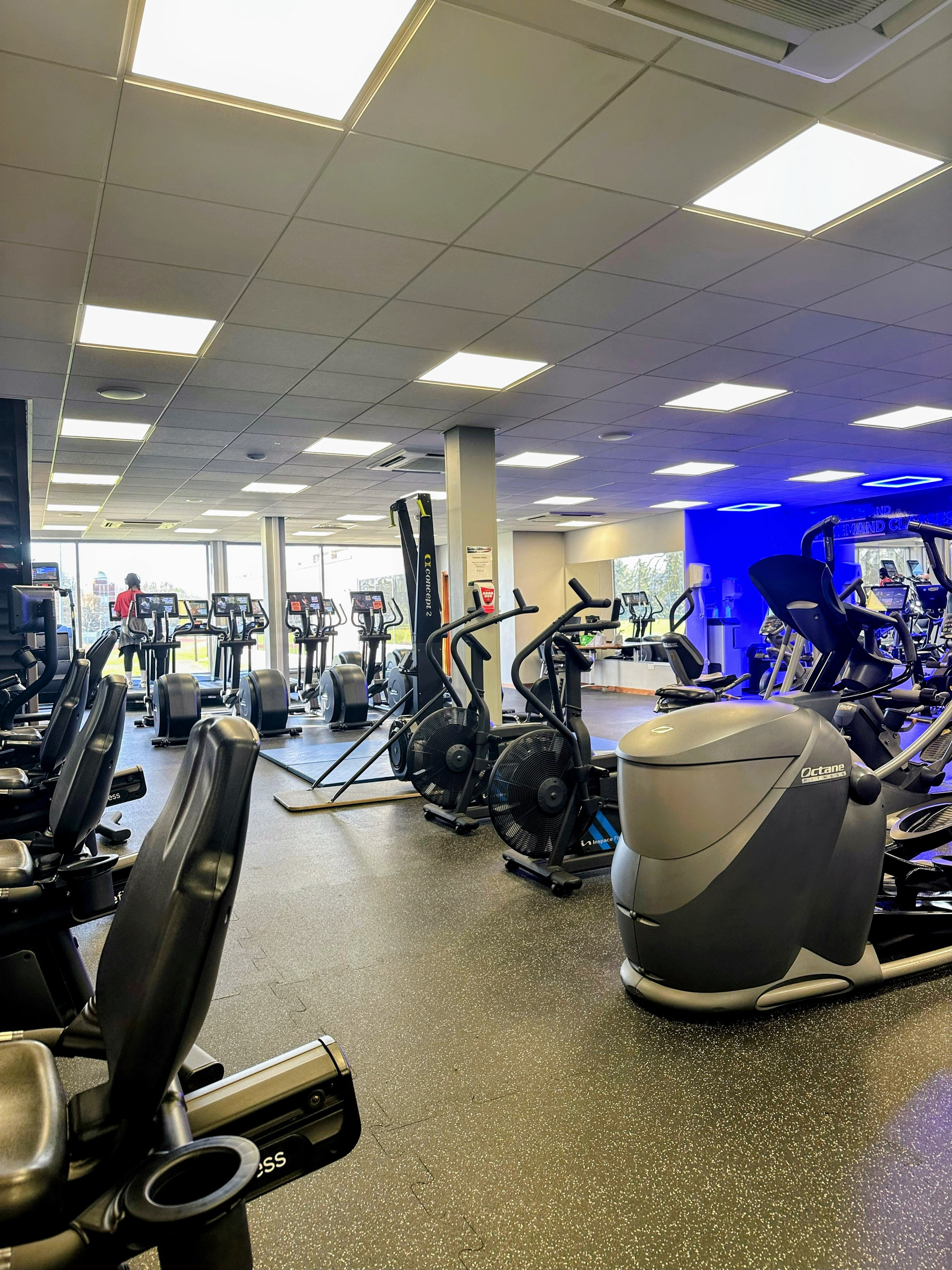

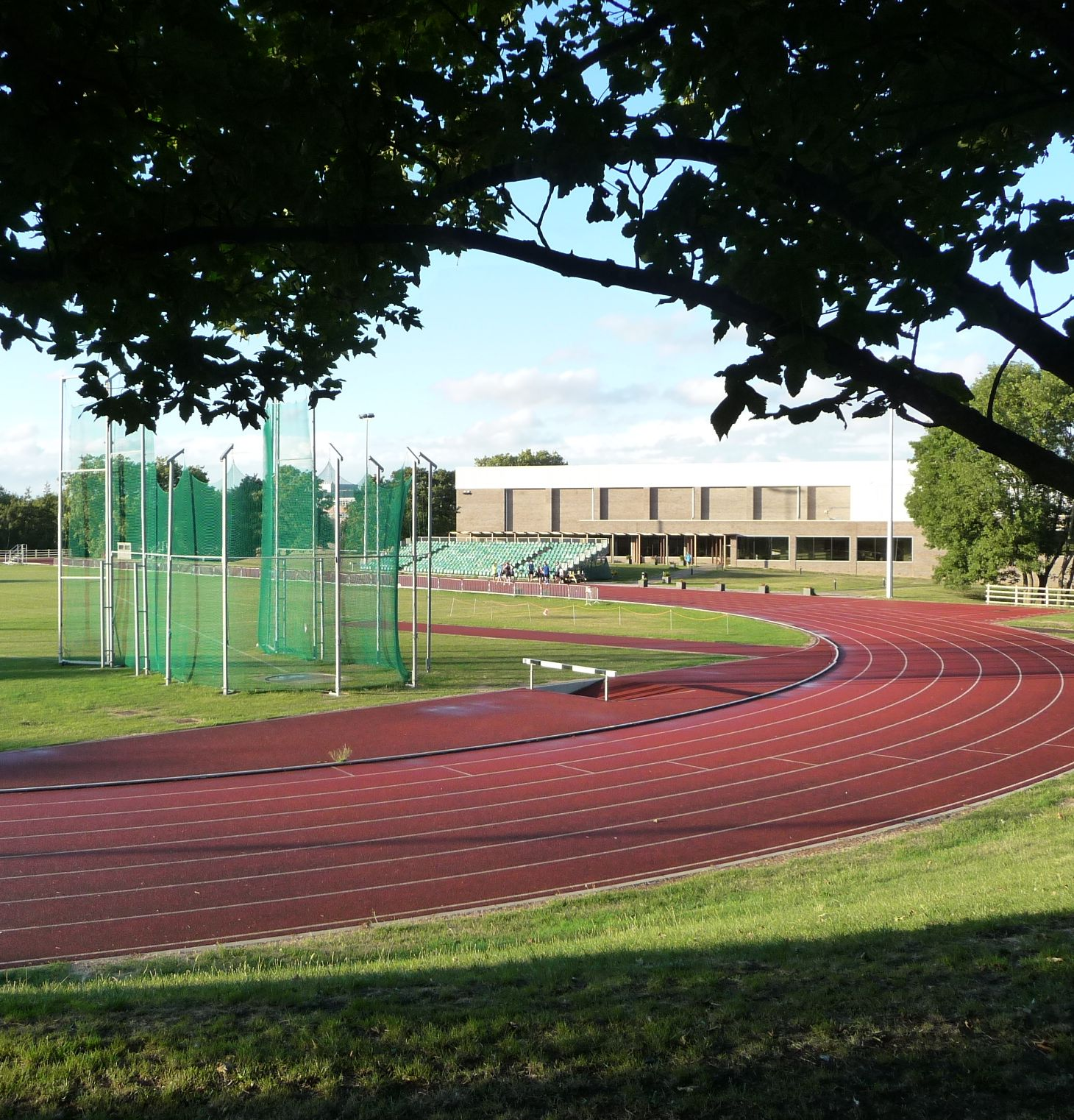
The athletics track within the sports centre's grounds

== See also ==
- Great Lines Heritage Park
