= Garrison Ground 2 =

Cricket ground in Gillingham, Kent, England

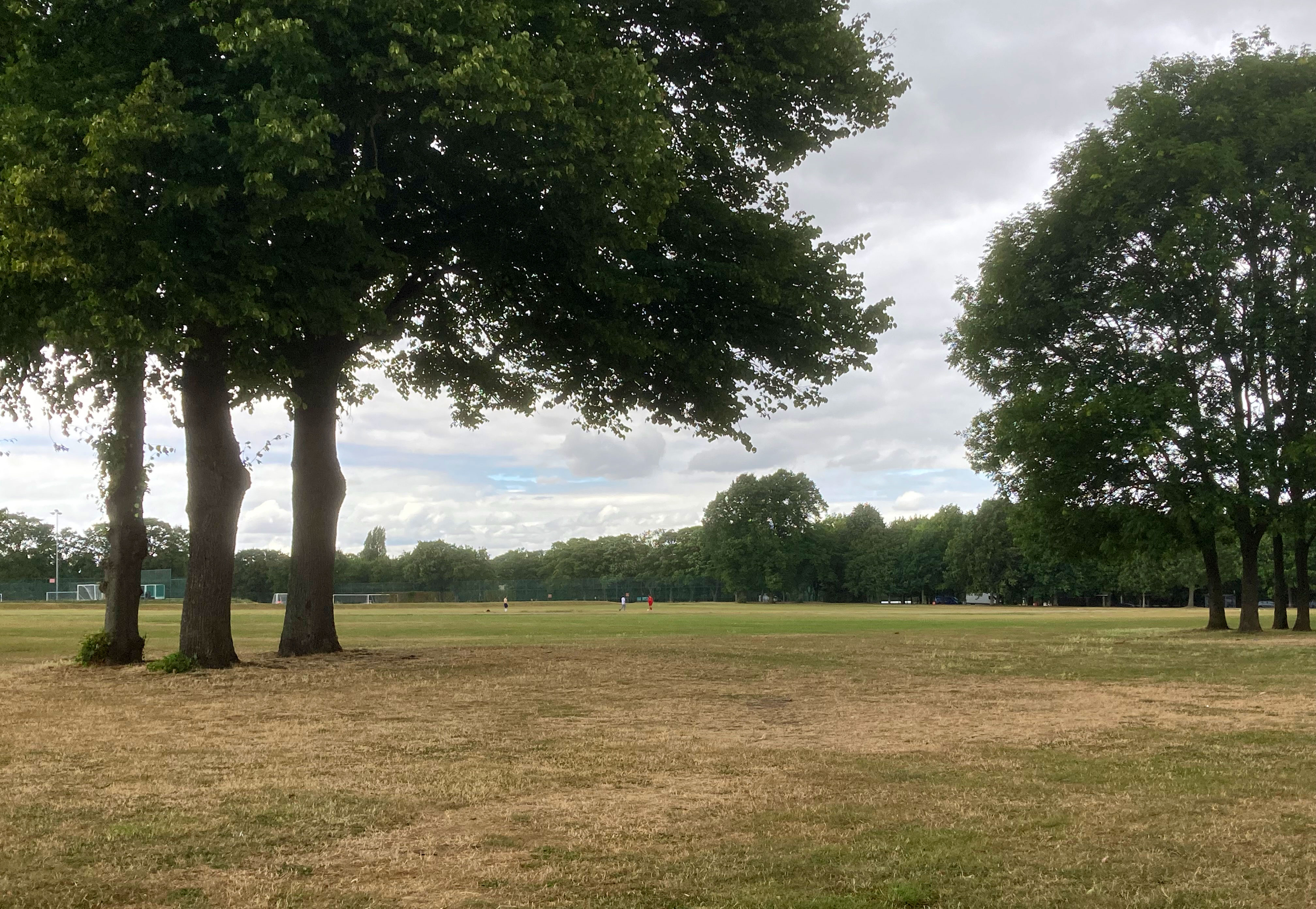
- The site of the ground from where the pavilion stood in 2022
- Interactive map of Garrison Ground 2

Ground information
- Location: Gillingham, Kent
- Country: England
- Coordinates: 51.388°N 0.541°E
- Establishment: 1864 (first known match)
- Last used: 1999

Team information
Royal Engineers Cricket Club	(1864–1961)
Kent County Cricket Club	(1937–1972)
Combined Services	(1949)
- As of 1 March 2018; Source: CricketArchive

Garrison Ground 2 was a cricket ground in Gillingham, Kent. The ground, which has also been known as the Royal Engineers Sports Ground and simply the Garrison Ground, was used by Kent County Cricket Club for first-class and List A cricket between 1937 and 1972 and was the home ground of the Royal Engineers Cricket Club until 1961.

The ground was located on Marlborough Road on the edge of the area known as the Chatham Lines, an area of open space historically containing a number of military fortifications. The site, which is now used as a recreation ground, is around 300 metres (980 ft) west of Gillingham High Street.

== Cricket history ==
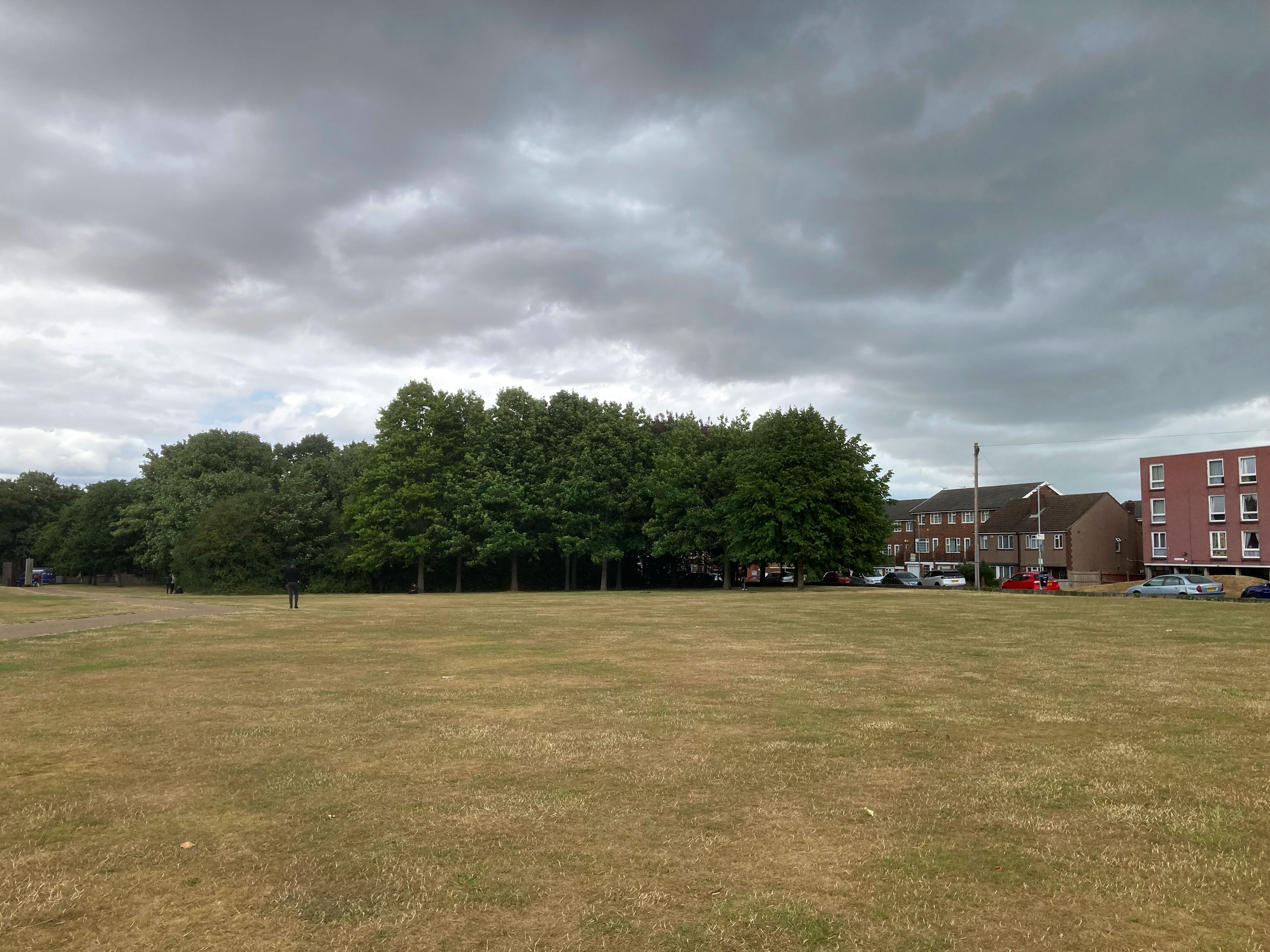
A view across the outfield of the former ground in 2022.

The ground was first used in 1864 by the Royal Engineers. It was used regularly by the club until 1961 when they moved to Garrison 1 Cricket Ground on the southern edge of the Chatham Lines.

The ground played host to 30 first-class, 28 of which featured Kent as the home team, and three List A matches. The Combined Services played two home matches on the ground, one against Kent and one against the touring New Zealanders in 1949. Kent's Second XI used the ground occasionally, most recently in 1994, and it was the venue for a match between Kent and the touring West Indians in August 1984, a 40 over benefit match for Bob Woolmer.

By the end of the 1967 season the quality of the pitch was causing "grave concern" to the MCC's Advisory County Cricket committee after 26 wickets fell in one days play in 1967 during which "the ball turned, stopped and lifted, sometimes prodigiously". The following year 22 wickets fell in a day on a pitch which was described as "a nightmare for batsmen". Following the match the Pitches Committee determined that the ground should not be used for first-class cricket in 1969 and the 1968 match was the final first-class fixture on the ground, although three List A matches were played on the ground, two in 1971 and one in 1972.

Kent have also used other pitches on the Chatham Lines, including Garrison 1 Cricket Ground and New Brompton Cricket Ground and cricket has been played on other pitches in the area. The ground was used by Old Anchorians Cricket Club until 1999.

== Records on the ground ==
A total of 30 first-class cricket matches were played on the ground, all but two with Kent as the home team.

- Highest total: 512/3 declared by Kent against Worcestershire, 1937
- Lowest total: 39 by Leicestershire against Kent, 1958
- Highest partnership: 318, 3rd wicket by TW Graveney and JF Crapp, for Gloucestershire against Kent, 1953
- Highest individual score: 211, TW Graveney for Gloucestershire against Kent, 1953
- Best bowling in an innings: 8/35, DVP Wright for Kent against Combined Services, 1949
- Best bowling in a match: 10/163, SH Martin for Worcestershire against Kent, 1939

The ground's three List A fixtures all featured Kent as the home team. The highest total made was 208 runs by Kent against Gloucestershire in 1971, with David Nicholls recording the ground's highest List A individual score in the same match with 64 runs. Derek Underwood recorded the best bowling figures on the ground in List A matches in the same game, taking four wickets for 25 runs from eight overs. All three matches on the ground were 40 over matches in the John Player League.

== Modern use ==
The ground is no longer in use as a cricket ground. This site is used as a recreation ground with football pitches laid out and was used by the Royal Engineers for hockey, football and rugby union in the past. The nearby Garrison Stadium has been used for a number of sports and is the current home of Medway Dragons who use it for rugby league.
