= HSBC Sports and Social Club =

Sports ground in Beckenham, London, England

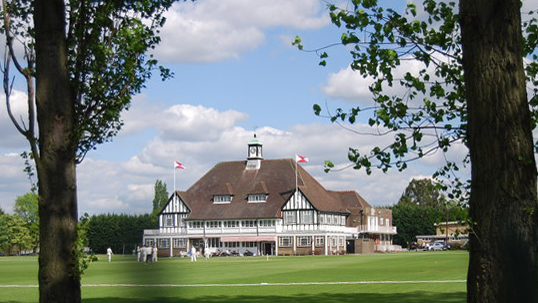
- The pavilion at HSBC Sports and Social Club
- Interactive map of HSBC Sports and Social Club

Ground information
- Location: Beckenham, London Borough of Bromley
- Country: England
- Coordinates: 51.418°N 0.038°W
- Home club: HSBC Cricket Club
- Establishment: 1930
- Owner: HSBC

International information
- Only women's ODI: 29 July 1993: Australia v New Zealand

Team information
Kent County Cricket Club	(1970)
New Beckenham Cricket Club	(1983–present)
- As of 6 September 2020; Source: CricketArchive

HSBC Sports and Social Club is a sports ground in Beckenham in the London Borough of Bromley, owned by HSBC bank. The ground was used for one First XI cricket match by Kent County Cricket Club and hosted one match in the 1993 Women's Cricket World Cup. It was known as the Midland Bank Sports Ground until Midland Bank was purchased by HSBC in 1992.

It is located around 0.75 miles (1.21 km) north-west of Beckenham town centre on Lennard Road. The Mid-Kent railway line runs along the eastern edge of the ground with New Beckenham railway station adjacent to the south-east corner. The River Pool runs along the western edge the ground.

== Cricketing history ==
The ground was established in 1920 by the London Joint City and Midland Bank Sports Association, an organisation which dated back to 1871 and became the Midland Bank Sports association in 1923. The first recorded cricket match on the ground was in 1930 when the Club Cricket Conference played the Universities Athletic Union.

The ground hosted a single List-A cricket match when Kent County Cricket Club beat Lancashire in a rain affected match in the 1970 John Player League. The ground was used as part of the centenary celebrations of the Midland Bank Sports association. The match saw Kent win by scoring more runs in the first nine overs of their innings than Lancashire had scored in their first ten overs, scoring 58 for 1 wicket. The result attracted some controversy because technically Kent had to bat for 10 overs before able to claim a win.

Beckenham was part of Kent until 1965 and the county has played matches at a number of grounds in what it describes as "Metropolitan Kent". It maintains a current base at the Kent County Cricket Ground, Beckenham 0.5 miles (0.8 km) from the ground.

During the 1993 Women's Cricket World Cup the ground held a single Women's One Day International when Australia women were beaten by New Zealand women. Debbie Hockley, who top-scored with 38 not out, and Penny Kinsella passed the Australian total of 77 without losing a wicket. Julie Harris took 3 wickets for 15 runs from nine overs for New Zealand as they knocked the favourites Australia out of the tournament in the final series of round-robin matches.

== Modern use ==
In local cricket, the ground is the home of New Beckenham Cricket Club, formerly known as HSBC Cricket Club who play in the Kent Cricket League. This site includes three cricket pitches as well as a number of net areas. As well as cricket, a number of other sports are played at the ground, including hockey, football, tennis and squash.

The astroturf pitch is used by New Beccehamian Hockey Club which has three men's and two women's teams who play in the Kent Hockey League.

== See also ==
- List of Kent County Cricket Club grounds
