= New Brompton Cricket Ground =

Cricket ground in New Brompton, Kent, England

- Interactive map of New Brompton Cricket Ground

Ground information
- Location: New Brompton, Kent
- Country: England
- Coordinates: 51.383°N 0.547°E (approx)
- Establishment: 1862 (first recorded match)

Team information
Kent	(1862)
- As of 5 September 2010; Source: CricketArchive

New Brompton Cricket Ground was a short-lived cricket ground in New Brompton in Chatham, Kent. The first recorded match on the ground was in 1862 when Kent County Cricket Club played Cambridgeshire in the ground's only first-class cricket match.

The ground, which was on the area known as the Chatham Lines, is no longer in existence and the location of the ground is only approximately known. It was probably laid out on an area known as Comparts Meadow to the south of the London, Chatham and Dover Railway, an area that had been built over by 1881 and now forms part of Gillingham. The only other match recorded as taking place on the ground was a non-first-class match in 1894 when Chatham Cricket Club played the touring South African team, although this is likely to have taken place elsewhere on the Lines.

Other cricket matches are known to have been played on the Chatham Lines, with matches recorded as early as 1773. These include matches played by the Royal Engineers Cricket Club, who used Garrison Ground 2, close to the site of the New Brompton ground, and now use the Garrison 1 Cricket Ground, and the Royal Navy cricket team. Kent have also played first-class matches at both of these grounds.
