= Garrison 1 Cricket Ground =

Cricket ground in Chatham, Kent, England

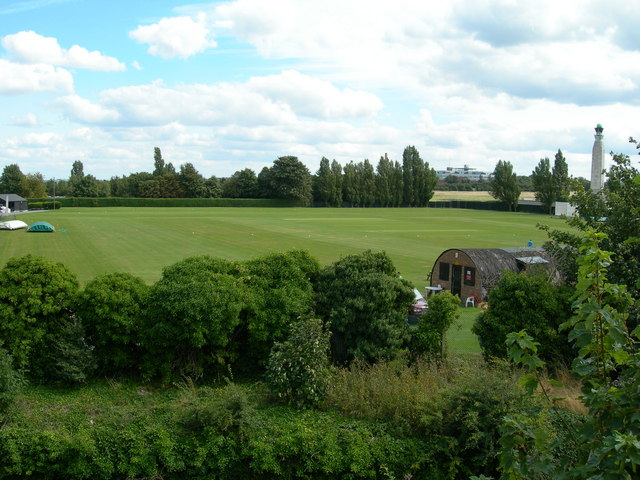
- The ground viewed from Fort Amherst with the Chatham Naval Memorial visible in the background
- Interactive map of Garrison 1 Cricket Ground

Ground information
- Location: Chatham, Kent
- Country: England
- Coordinates: 51.385°N 0.532°E
- Home club: Royal Engineers Cricket Club
- Establishment: 1879 (first recorded match)
- Owner: Ministry of Defence

Team information
Royal Engineers Cricket Club	(1899–present)
Royal Navy Cricket Club	(1921–1980)
Kent County Cricket Club	(1926–1927)
- As of 18 February 2018; Source: CricketArchive

Garrison 1 Cricket Ground is a cricket ground in Chatham, Kent. The ground is owned by the Ministry of Defence and has been used by military teams throughout its history, being linked with the various military establishments at Chatham. It has been known as the Nore Command Cricket Ground and the Royal Navy and Royal Marines Recreation Ground, the Nore Command being associated with the nearby Chatham Dockyard. It remains the main home ground used by the Royal Engineers Cricket Club.

The ground is located immediately west of the outer defences of Fort Amherst, part of the 18th century military defences associated with the naval base, at the south-west corner of the Chatham Lines, an area of open space historically containing a number of military fortifications. It is overlooked by the Chatham Naval Memorial and is around 0.9 kilometres (0.56 mi) north-east of Chatham town centre and 1.2 kilometres (0.75 mi) west of Gillingham town centre. Although technically the ground is in Gillingham it, along with the military establishments nearby, is traditionally referred to as being located in Chatham.

== Cricket history ==
The first recorded match on the ground was in 1879, although cricket has been played on or near the ground since the middle of the 19th century and on the Great Lines since at least 1750.

Kent County Cricket Club used the ground for two Second XI fixtures, both against Norfolk County Cricket Club in the Minor Counties Championships of 1925 and 1926 and for three First XI first-class cricket matches, once in 1926 and twice in 1927. Derbyshire were the opposition in the grounds first first-class match in June 1926 and played Kent again on the ground the following year.

The Royal Navy played two first-class matches on the ground in 1929, against MCC and the Royal Air Force. The Navy used the ground regularly until 1960 and played their last match on the ground in 1980, Chatham Naval Base closing in 1984.

The ground was used by a variety of other teams, including the Army cricket team, who played a number of times against Kent's Second XI on the ground, and amateur clubs such as Band of Brothers and Incogniti.

== Royal Engineers Cricket Club ==
The Royal Engineers (RE) first played cricket in 1862 as a formal club. The nearby Garrison Ground 2 was used as the club's home ground initially, with Garrison Ground 1 first used in 1899 when it hosted one of the annual matches between the RE and the Royal Artillery. Garrison 1 Ground has been used regularly by the RE since the 1960s as their home ground, remaining in use as of 2017.

== Records on the ground ==
A total of five first-class cricket matches were played on the ground, three with Kent as the home team and two with the Royal Navy playing at home.

- Highest total: 382 by Royal Navy against MCC, 1929
- Lowest total: 113 by Royal Navy against MCC, 1929
- Highest partnership: 155, 5th wicket by SH Martin and JC Hubble, for MCC against Royal Navy, 1929
- Highest individual score: 187, FE Woolley for Kent against Derbyshire, 1927
- Best bowling in an innings: 7/43, SH Martin for MCC against Royal Navy, 1929
- Best bowling in a match: 10/163, SH Martin for MCC against Royal Navy, 1929

Both the highest and lowest team totals scored on the ground were achieved by the same team in the same match. The Royal Navy scored 113 all out in their first innings batting against MCC in 1929. Following on they scored 382 in their second innings, winning the match after bowling out MCC for 139 runs in the final innings of the match.

== Other uses ==
The Royal Engineers have also used the ground for hockey matches.
