= Fort Amherst =

Fortification in South East England

- Fort Amherst logo

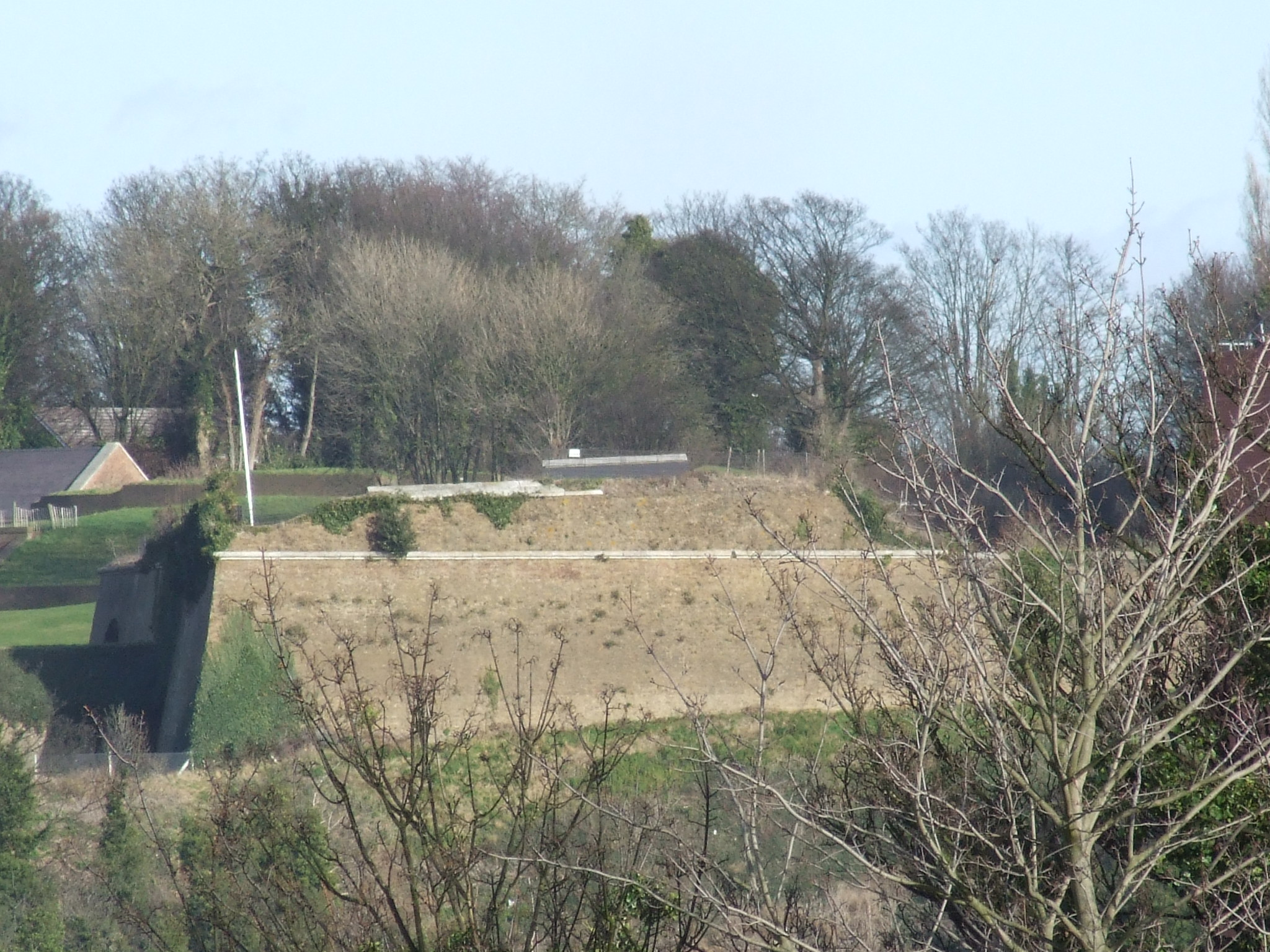
- The fort's outer defensive walls, as seen from Fort Pitt
- Established: 1756
- Location: Dock Road, Chatham, Medway, Kent, England
- Coordinates: 51.387°N 0.526°E
- Type: Napoleonic-era fortress / military museum
- Collections: Fortifications, artillery, tunnel complex (guided tours)
- Owner: Fort Amherst Heritage Trust
- Website: http://www.fortamherst.com

Fort Amherst is a Napoleonic-era military fortress in Chatham, Kent, England. It was constructed between April and October 1756 at the southern end of the Brompton Lines during the Seven Years’ War, with the primary purpose of defending Chatham Dockyard and the River Medway from a potential French invasion. The fortifications were later significantly expanded during the Napoleonic Wars. Today, Fort Amherst is open year-round as a visitor attraction, offering guided tours through its extensive tunnel complex.

== History ==
The defences in 1770.

The primary purpose of all the Medway fortifications was the defence of the Naval Dockyard. This was largely the result of the Raid on the Medway 12 June to 14 June 1667 when the Nederlandse Staatsevloot (Dutch State Fleet) inflicted heavy damages on Chatham Dockyard. Defences were planned for Chatham Dockyard from 1708 and land was then acquired by two Acts of Parliament. These were the Fortifications Act 1708 and the Fortifications Act 1709. The land was surveyed in April 1715 by Duke of Marlborough. The first plan of defences was an enceinte (ring of fortifications), from Gun Wharf, Chatham, to north of the village of Brompton.

From January 1755 to August 1755, the 'Prince of Wales' Bastion, 'Prince Williams Bastion', 'Kings Bastion', 'Prince Edwards Bastion', 'Prince Henry's Bastion' and the 'Prince Fredericks Bastion' were all built. These and the ditches, built during the Seven Years' War (1756–1763), became known as the Chatham Lines and were entered by four gateways with bridges. The fortifications were designed in January 1755 by Captain John Peter Desmaretze of the Board of Ordnance and consisted of a 9-metre-wide (30 ft) earthwork ditch and a 3-metre (9.8 ft) parapet.

In June 1757, an infantry barracks (for a troop garrison) was built to man the defences.

During the American Revolutionary War (1778–1783), the lines were enhanced and strengthened. The strong point of the design were two Redoubts - 'Amherst' (at the southern end) and 'Townsend' (at the northern end). Amherst Redoubt later became Fort Amherst. Each was equipped with 14 42-pounders, 10 9-pounders, 8 6-pounders and 2 4-pounder guns.

In February 1779, during the construction, workmen found an existing foundation of a Roman building. Several finds, including pieces of Roman brick and tile, were made. Roman coins were also found, including one of the Empress Faustina, and one of the Emperor Claudius. The finds were recorded by Rev. James Douglas, working as Lt Douglas with the Royal Engineers 'North Lincs Militia, who later wrote a book describing all of his archaeological research - Nenia Britannica.

The defences in 1812.

During the Napoleonic Wars (1803–1815) the Chatham defences were enlarged and considerably strengthened. Further batteries were added (such as the Cornwallis Battery) and the ditches revetted (lined with brick), to the plans of General Hugh Debbrieg, Chief Engineer for Lord Amherst. Debbrieg had originally helped in the "Cumberland Lines" planning with Captain John Peter Desmaretze. His plan for the Chatham Lines, drawn by Joseph Heath and dated January 1755, is kept at the British Museum.

Also, from September 1802 until June 1811, prisoners, mostly convicts from St Mary's Island, were set to work on extending the tunnels at Fort Amherst and creating vast underground stores and shelters, new magazines, barracks, gun batteries and guardrooms. More than 50 smooth-bore cannons were also mounted at Fort Amherst. The last building works were completed in about March 1820. A maze of tunnels, used to move ammunition around Fort Amherst, were dug into the chalk cliffs.

A second gun battery, 'Townsend Redoubt', was built at the northeastern corner of Chatham Dockyard at the same time as Fort Amherst. Both the Townsend Redoubt and Fort Amherst were inside the 1756 brick-lined earthwork bastions known as the "Cumberland Lines", which surrounded the whole east side of Chatham Dockyard down to St Mary's Island. These have now been built over.

Fort Clarence in Rochester and Fort Pitt, on the Rochester-Chatham borders, were built in 1805–1815 to protect the southern approaches.

Although the Cumberland Lines were never put to the test, their design would have made a formidable defensive facility against any possible invasion.

In December 1820, because of improvements in artillery equipment and greater firing ranges, the defences of Fort Amherst were declared obsolete. The entire fortified area was then used as a training-ground during the Victorian era, with practice sieges becoming so popular that they attracted thousands of visitors to Chatham. VIPs were seated on the Casemated Barracks that once stood in the Lower Lines and also on Prince William's Barracks within Fort Amherst itself.

One such siege is described in Charles Dickens Pickwick Papers. Fort Amherst has been described by English Heritage as the most complete Napoleonic fortification in Britain and as such has great national historical significance.

On 19 November 1959, the site was scheduled as an ancient monument.

Fort Amherst was still in use during the Second World War when it served as an Air Raid Warning Command Post for the Air Raid Precautions (ARP) and the Royal Observer Corps (ROC). It later underwent restoration to make more areas accessible to the public. An attempt was made by the Royal Engineers, to convert Fort Amherst into a display ground for their military vehicles, as an offshoot of the Royal Engineers Museum in Gillingham, but this was prevented by a lack of finance.

== Current use ==
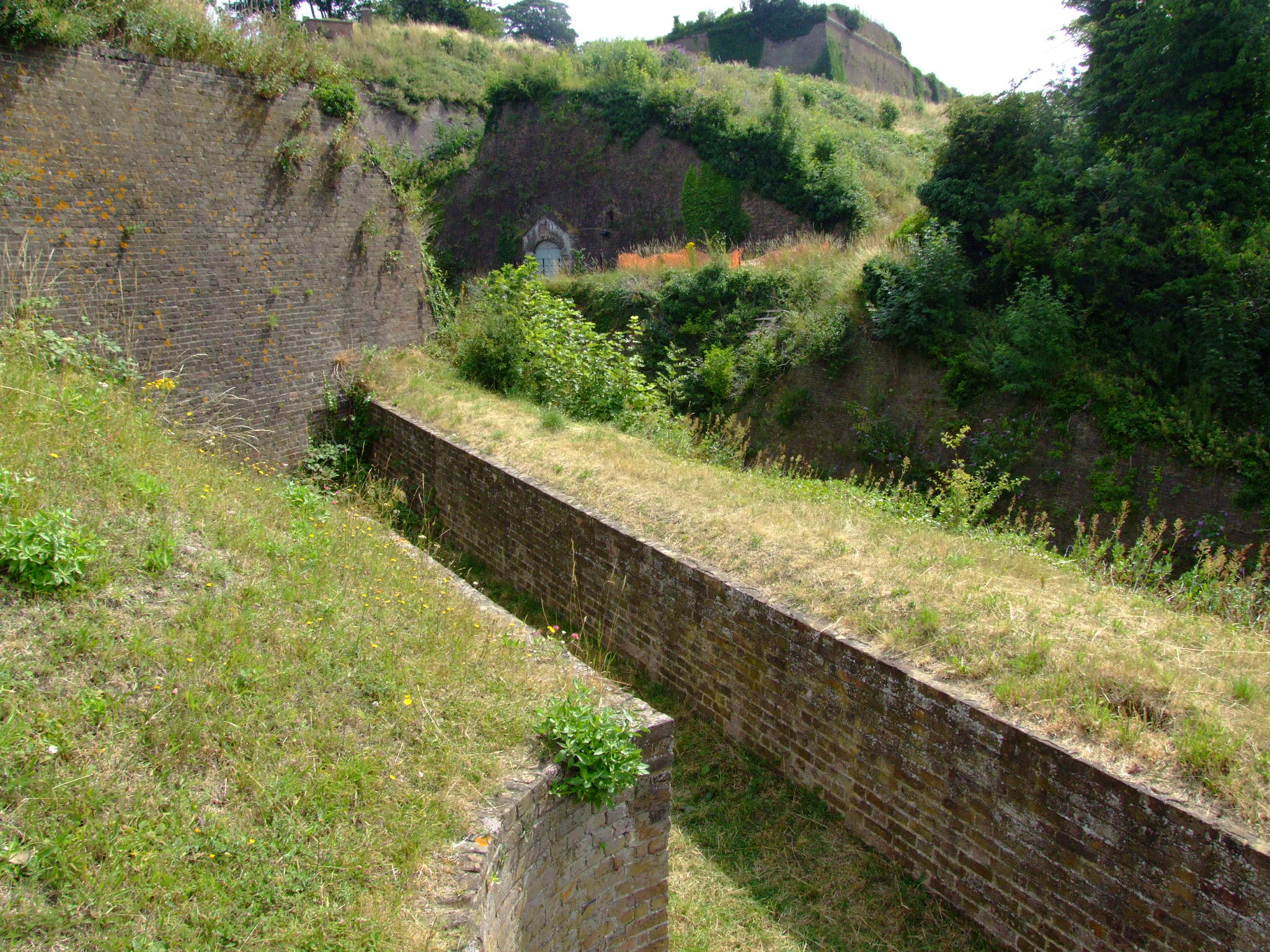
Dry ditch beneath the Lower Cornwallis Battery

During August 1977 a group of enthusiasts were given permission by the Ministry of Defence to start tidying up the site, with the intention of restoring Fort Amherst. During April 1980 Fort Amherst was purchased from the Ministry of Defence by the Fort Amherst and Lines Trust and public open days began.

Fort Amherst is now managed and operated by the Fort Amherst Heritage Trust, a Registered Charity located along Dock Road in Chatham. The Fort Amherst Heritage Trust opens Fort Amherst to visitors every day of the year and provides daily Tunnel Tours at 11am and 2pm (subject to changes). Fort Amherst Heritage Trust have also run a programme of regular events, including Ghost Tours, which typically take place on the first Friday evening of each month, and over-night Ghost Watch paranormal investigations within the tunnels. Halloween Tours have also taken place, where guests make their way through the dark rooms and passages.

Students from the Kent Institute of Art & Design (KIAD) at Fort Pitt in Rochester, used to dress as the undead, vampires, demons and skeletons and then hide near The Cave Yard in piles of leaves and twigs, so as to surprise visitors during the Halloween Tour. On 31 October 1985 sound effects were used during the Halloween Tour to make it more genuine. Ghosts are known to haunt Fort Amherst, and one is the Little Drummer Boy who is a headless ghost that walks through the brick-lined passages of Fort Amherst. The Little Drummer Boy can be heard tapping or drumming. Some visitors to Fort Amherst report feeling a chill in the air or a gentle tap on their shoulders. After this, the sound of the Little Drummer Boy stops as the headless ghost walks past the visitors. After walking by, the spooky noises of the Little Drummer Boy then start again.

Some of the cannons are fired on Sundays throughout the year and periodically during the school holidays.

Fort Amherst was one of the filming locations for the 1986 Warner Bros. film The Mission and the 2011 film Sherlock Holmes: A Game of Shadows as well as the 2015 BBC TV adaptation of Agatha Christie's Partners in Crime.

On Sundays, during the summer 2008 season, Fort Amherst was open to the public, without charge, to promote the Great Lines Heritage Park and the proposed World Heritage Site application for Chatham Dockyard and its Naval Defences.

In 2012 the 200th anniversary of the establishment, under Royal Warrant of the Royal Engineers at Brompton Barracks (the Royal School of Military Engineering), was marked by a team of Royal Engineers designing, building and assembling the Bicentenary Bridge which leads to a part of Fort Amherst also known as Spur Battery and to the Inner Lines, that were the Napoleonic Defensive Ditches. These parts of Fort Amherst are accessible only at special times and during guided visits.

During 2012 Fort Amherst received about 20,000 visitors.
