= Great Lines Heritage Park =

Park in Medway, Kent, England

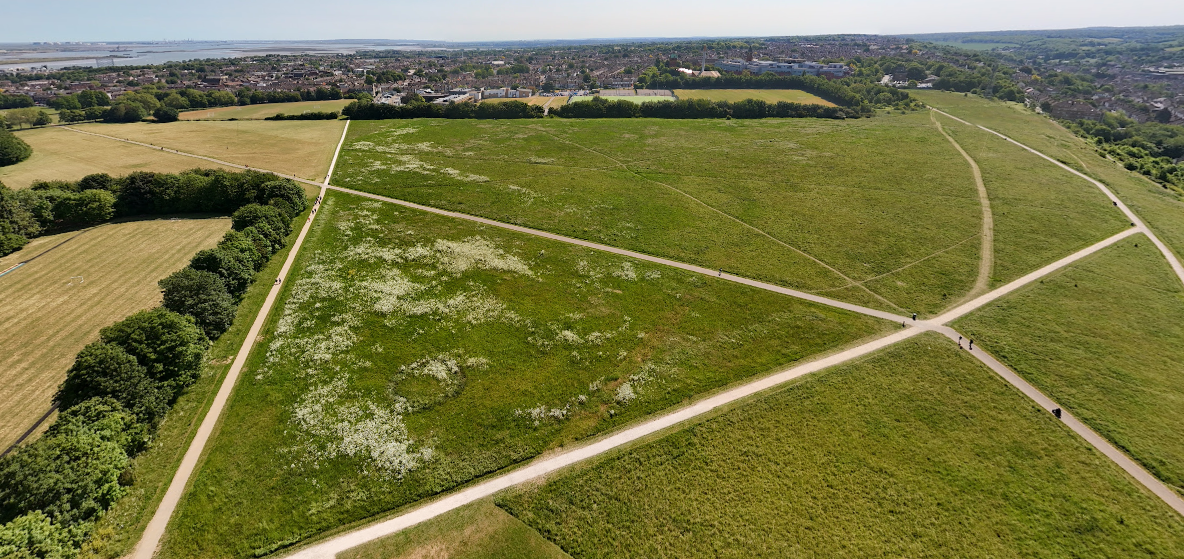
- Aerial view of the Great Lines Heritage Park
- Interactive map of Great Lines Heritage Park
- Type: Public Heritage park
- Location: Medway, Kent, United Kingdom
- Coordinates: 51.385°N 0.537°E
- Area: 70 hectares (170 acres)
- Created: 2008
- Operator: Medway Council

The Great Lines Heritage Park is a linked network of open spaces in Kent's Medway Towns—Chatham, Gillingham, Brompton and the Historic Dockyard. Shaped by its military past, it encompasses Fort Amherst, the Chatham Lines, the Field of Fire (later known as the Great Lines), the Inner Lines, Lower Lines Park and Medway Park Sports Centre. Built during the Napoleonic era to guard Chatham Dockyard, these earthworks were never tested in battle; instead, they were kept as a clear defensive field, preventing development and preserving the land as open space. In 1989, Gillingham Borough Council installed a plaque commemorating the park's acquisition for public use. Today, it offers year‑round pedestrian and cycle routes linking Chatham and Gillingham.

== Chatham Lines ==
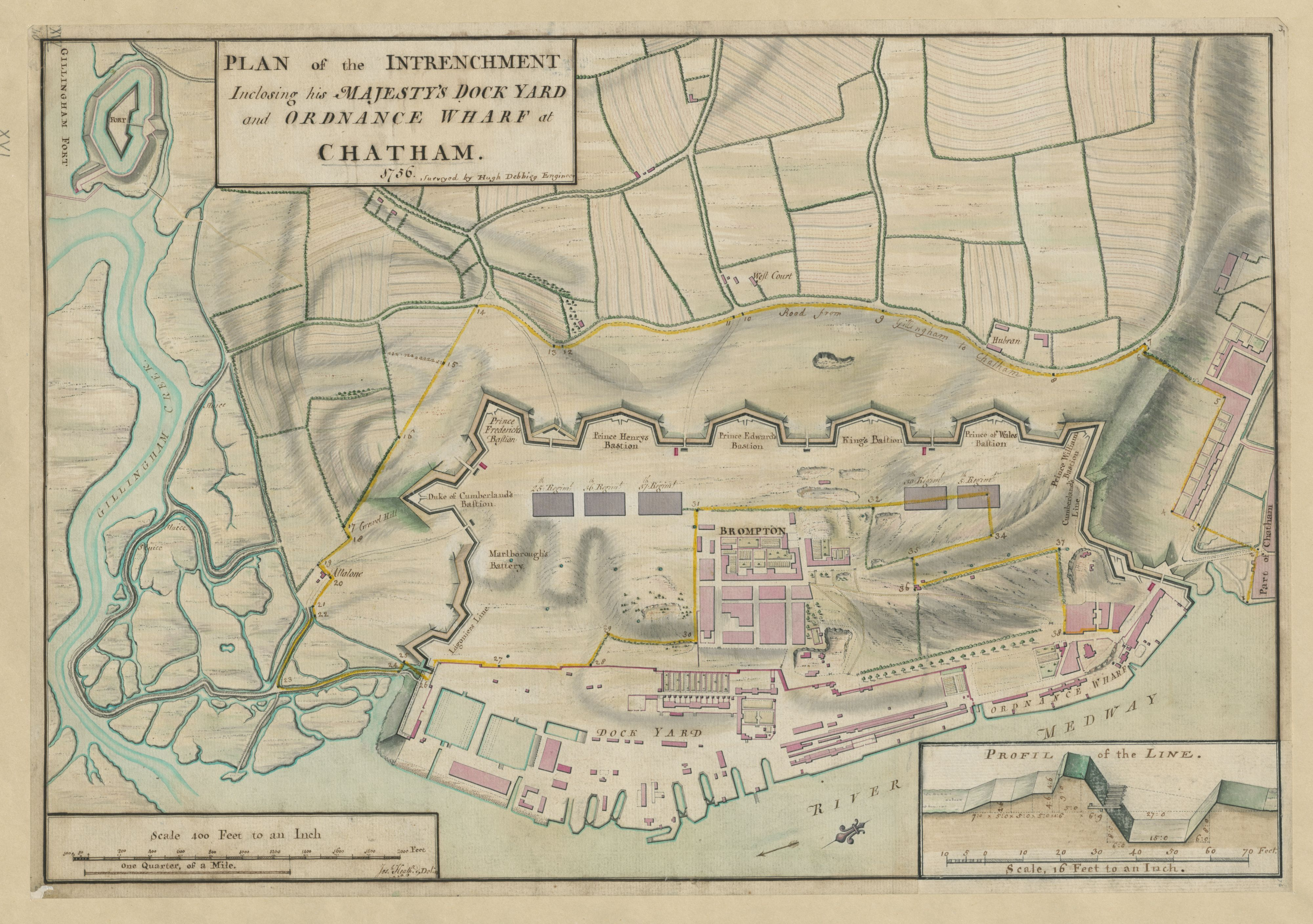
Plan of the Intrenchment Inclosing his Majesty's Dock Yard and Ordnance Wharf at Chatham. 1756. (Surveyed by Hugh Debbieg Engineer).

The Chatham Lines (also called the Brompton or Great Lines) form one of England's finest surviving bastion‑trace fortifications, built to guard the landward approaches to Chatham Dockyard and its barracks. Construction began in 1755, during the early years of the Seven Years' War, and by 1757 comprised a continuous dry ditch up to 8 ft deep and 27 ft wide, surmounted by a 9 ft high earthen rampart. At regular intervals nine angular bastions—Prince Frederick, Prince Henry, Prince Edward, King's, Duke of Cumberland's among them—projected from the curtain wall, allowing enfilading fire along the ditch and across the adjacent ramparts. Three sally‑ports provided controlled access, while the line extended some 3 km eastward from Fort Amherst, encircling Brompton before returning to the banks of St Mary's Creek near Gillingham.

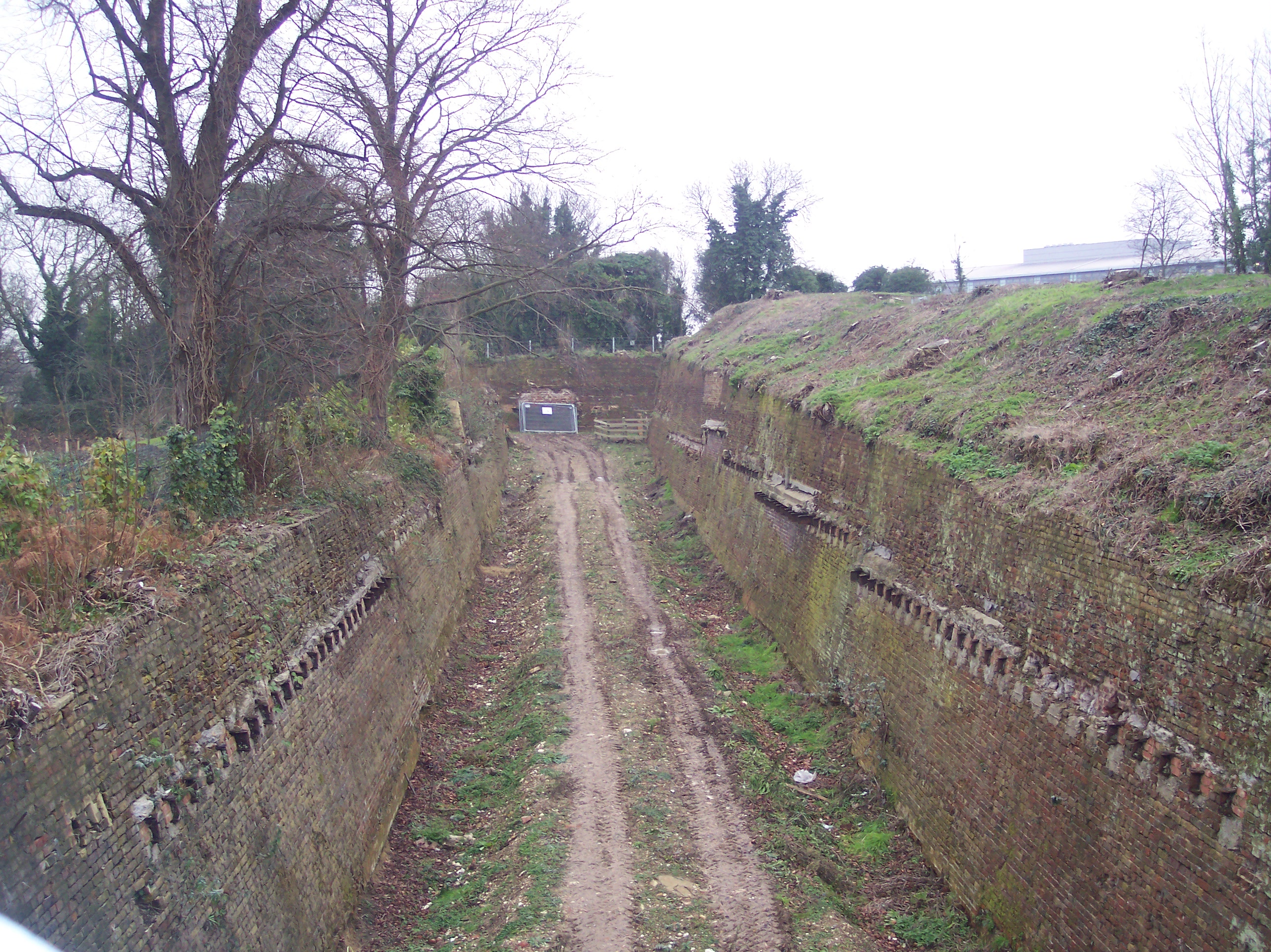
Part of the Napoleonic Ditch running from Fort Amherst to St Mary's Creek.

In the early 19th century, with the threat of Napoleonic invasion at its height, the Lines were substantially upgraded. From 1803 onwards, the ramparts were revetted in brick, outworks such as the Amherst Redoubt and Spur Battery were added at the southern end, and further retrenchments—including hornworks and redoubts—enhanced enfilade coverage of the moats. Although never tested in combat, these works formed a formidable "field of fire", their open expanses deliberately preserved to deny cover to any attacking force.

During the Second World War the Lines were pressed back into service as part of the Chatham "nodal point" defences. The original ditch became a continuous anti‑tank obstacle, supplemented by barbed‑wire entanglements, concrete "dragon’s teeth" (anti‑tank pimples), and dozens of pillboxes and gun‑emplacements. Royal Engineers cleared fields of fire across the ditch, emplaced infantry and artillery pillboxes at intervals, and installed an emergency water reservoir and spigot‑mortar positions. At its zenith in 1944 the Medway District hosted some 31 anti‑aircraft batteries (13 heavy and 20 light) plus around 20 temporary light batteries established under the DIVER plan—many of which were integrated with Chatham Lines positions to protect the dockyard from air attack.

After 1945 the Lines again fell into disuse. Post‑war housing spilled onto parts of the earthworks around Brompton, and many of the wartime installations were infilled or demolished. However, the core bastion‑trace earthworks, complete with revetted ditches and ramparts, survive remarkably intact and today lie within the Great Lines Heritage Park. The Chatham Lines are protected as a scheduled monument under Kent ref. 1003364, ensuring their preservation for public enjoyment and study.

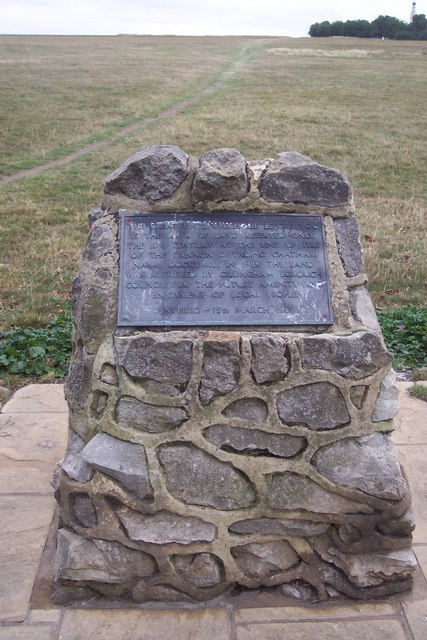
Dedication plaque 'The Great Lines, which lie before you is the area of land reserved since the 18th Century as the line of fire of the Cannon defending Chatham Naval Dockyard. In 1989, the land was acquired by Gillingham Borough Council for the future amenity and enjoyment of local people. Unveiled 15 March 1989.'

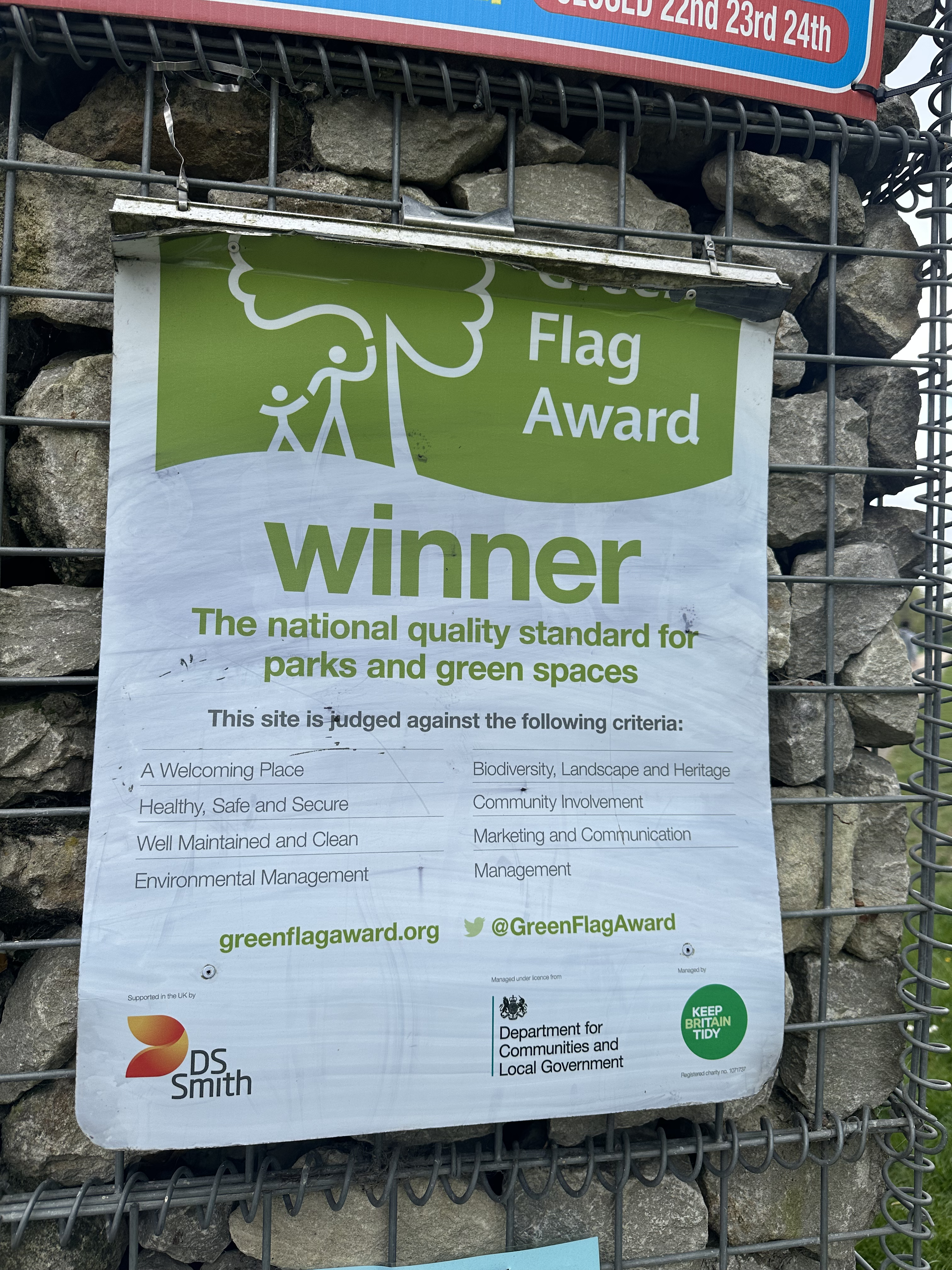
The Great Lines holds a Green Flag award, as well as a Green Heritage Site Accreditation.

== The Field of Fire ==
This is an open stretch of land immediately in front of the Chatham Lines fortifications (of Fort Amherst), if the outer fortification was breached then the enemy would have to cross the field of fire, its openness (meaning no shelter) would allow for a clear view, and shot, of the approaching enemy.

In 1709, by an Act of Parliament, the Government compulsorily purchased the land in 'Westcourt', along with a part of 'Upbury Manor' and some land in Chatham, for the building of the Dockyard defences and the lines.

A cricket pitch was also set-up on the land pre-1700s. But when the lines were extended and the Field of Fire was also extended, it also upset the locals of Gillingham. On 14 June 1758, Captain George Brisac (the Lines superintendent) was threatened with murder (by an unknown local) if he did not restore the pitch.

Between 1755 and 1756, the Chatham Lines were built as a large earthwork ditch around Fort Amherst.

This open land was used to graze cattle between 1760 and 1812.

In 1770, the parish surveyed the crown property around the lines. In 1781, it listed 16 public rights of way crossing the lines.

Between 1778 and 1783, the lines were extended and enhanced.

In 1800, Edward Hasted notes "Westward of the village (of Gillingham) is Upberry and the manor house of Westcourt; beyond which the ground ascends to the summit of the chalk hill, on which is the town of Brompton"

In 1803, the Chatham Lines were upgraded (due to the start of the Napoleonic War). The ditch walls were rebuilt in brick.

In 1804, additional land was purchased by the government, to further extend the Field of Fire. This meant that West Court and Upbury Farmhouses were demolished.

From 1812, the Royal Engineers took over Brompton Barracks from the artillery.

The Field of Fire also provided the main exercise ground for the Engineers and their horses from 1824 until 1877. They were used to test defensive and offensive techniques and to test tactics in siege warfare, prior to foreign campaigns. The sieges also became major spectator events, including being recorded by Charles Dickens in The Pickwick Papers and in The Illustrated London News.

Between 1822 and 1838, the Lines were also used to hold horse-racing events. They were very popular. They were held for two days in August in 1838.

In 1862, the Royal Engineers cricket team was established, using a pitch on the lines.

The Great Lines was also the home training pitch of the Royal Engineers (who were winners of the 1875 FA Cup Final). In 1893, New Brompton Football Club was established. This later became Gillingham Football Club.

In 1872, plans for a railway line were drawn up by the Royal Commission to connect the forts.

In June 1897, the Great Lines (the name used for the Field of Fire) were used to host a celebration of the Diamond Jubilee of Queen Victoria. A huge bonfire was a grand finale of the day festivities. In 1902, on the coronation of King Edward VII, 8,000 children were assembled on the lines, to sing 'the Old Hundredth' and the 'National anthem'.

In 1904, the 'Ravelin Building' was built (on the northside) of Brompton Road and Prince Arthur Road, in front of the Chatham Lines. It was used as Electrical engineer's school for the Royal Engineers. Designed by Major E.C.S.Moore (RE). In 1978, it was converted to a museum, 'The Royal Engineers Museum'. It was classed as Grade II listed on 5 December 1996.

Between 1914 and 1918 (World War I), the Lines were used by the engineers to train in trench warfare and mining. The Lines were bombed several times, but the damage did not stop the dockyard working. The Field of Fire became a tented camp and parts of the Inner Lines gained accommodation huts, supplementing pre-existing barracks defending the Dockyard.

On 19 July 1919, Peace Day (which later become Armistice Day) was celebrated in Medway, which included a 'Big Tea Party' and evening fireworks display (organised by the military).

Also the 'Garrison Sports Ground' was built in the 1920s on the Great Lines, beside Brompton Road. Which was also the site of a large underground bomb shelter.

The Lines were also used for Home Guard training. In 1941, the fighting garrison in Medway totalled 5,270, combining Royal Navy, Royal Marines, army and Home Guard units. The Chatham Lines were also used as a Fire Service action station point.

In 1948, a NAAFI (Naval, Army and Air Force) club was built, beside Brompton Road on the Field of Fire, opposite the Garrison Sports Ground. Since the Field of Fire was no longer needed due to current wartime tactics. The club opened on 16 July 1948 by the Commander-in-Chief, The Nore, Admiral Sir Harold Burrough. It cost about £150,000 to build. It had 200 single, and 48 double rooms, a nursery and playroom, games room, restaurant, tavern bar, 3 flats and a large ballroom. On the opening night of the ballroom was Jack Train, Billy Ternent and his orchestra. One of the first visitors was King George VI. Due to the closure of many Royal Naval services in the Dockyard and Medway, the club became unprofitable, and on 28 July 1962 the club closed. After five years of being empty, it was bought by two Canadian Hotel owners, who converted it into a budget Hotel, then called 'The Aurora Hotel'. In 1980, it changed hands to new owners, who renamed it the King Charles Hotel. The land around the hotel is not part of the Great Lines Heritage Park.

In 1957, part of the Great Lines (a plot of land close to Gillingham and Medway Maritime Hospital) was used to build 'The Great Lines School'. It opened in April 1957 and had 270 pupils. It was the first co-educational school in Gillingham. In June 1959, it became Upbury Manor school and was official re-opened by actress Dame Edith Evans. Since 2010, it is now known as Brompton Academy.

In 1989, the land was acquired by Gillingham Borough Council for the 'future amenity and enjoyment of local people'.

A part of the park has been designated a Site of Nature Conservation Interest (SNCI), for its chalk grassland flora and it has also been designated as a Local Wildlife Site (LWS). Notable species include the rare red star thistle (Centaurea calcitrapa), as well as wild clary (Salvia verbenaca) and squinancywort (Asperula cynanchica). Notable wildlife in the park, include the skylarks (Alauda), and kestrels, as well as many other birds, butterflies and insects.

Currently, the park is mainly used for informal leisure pursuits, such as kite-flying, cycling and walking, as well as the annual fireworks display.

The park is also the venue for a free 5 km run each Saturday morning at 9am. Great Lines parkrun began in September 2013 and regularly attracts between 300 and 350 runners each week.

The park is also used for Armed Forces Day, and other large local events.

== The Inner Lines ==
The name Inner Lines was originally applied to all the open area immediately behind the defensive ramparts of the Great Lines. This area was intended for the mustering and manoeuvring of troops for the defence of the fortifications, and were initially kept free of buildings.

In June 1808, after an act of parliament was passed, the main road from Gillingham to Chatham (via the Field of Fire) was closed. The other remaining linking road, went through the lines via a new drawbridge at the northern Sally Port. This became locally known as the 'Brompton Barrier'. Footpaths passing through the southern Sally Port remained in use.

In 1863, the Garrison Gymnasium was built (inside the Lines and beside the remaining road). It is now Grade II* listed.

In December 1868, by permission of the War Secretary, a portion of the inner line of fortifications, adjoining Fort Amherst, (between the Field of Fire and the Dockyard) was set apart as a recreation ground for the use of the officers connected with the (Chatham Dockyard) garrison. An avenue of trees was part of this new Victorian park, which also included carriage drives and tennis courts.

In 1876, a plan shows that the Brompton Barrier is still in place, but the guard house is disused. In 1879, an Ordnance Survey map is made of the area, it shows that the barrier has been removed and the road has been straightened and used a causeway to pass over the ditch (instead of a drawbridge). This was due to the building of the Commandant's House (started in 1876), which also meant a large garden, hence the road re-alignment. The Sally Port remained intact. But by the 1909 OS Map survey, the Sallyport was demolished, but the Guardhouse remained.

During the 18th Century the Inner Lines played home to the true park and recreation ground of the Military Residents. It contained the 'Commandant's Pleasure Grounds and Kitchen Garden'. The formal layout of the gardens reflected the need for military order, somewhat at odds with the fashion at the time of creating Capability Brown style landscapes.

On the 1909 O.S. map, it shows the name of the road from Gillingham to Chatham passing through Brompton and the Lines, named as 'Brompton Road'.

Between 1914 and 1918 (World War I), parts of the Inner Lines were used to site accommodation huts, supplementing pre-existing barracks defending the Dockyard.

During 1945, anti-tank defences were erected along the lines, this meant some of the ditch around Chatham Lines were filled in.

After the war, during the 60s, more of the Chatham Lines were either removed and more of the ditch was filled. Also within the Inner Lines, post-war housing was erected for the troops of the Royal Engineers. The houses in Brompton were also used for engineers working on the Chatham Dockyard nuclear submarine refit facilities.

As part of the Great Lines Heritage Park (set up in 2008), the Inner Lines is mostly woodland, sports pitches and gardens, which are undergoing various stages of restorations.

== Medway Park Sports Centre ==
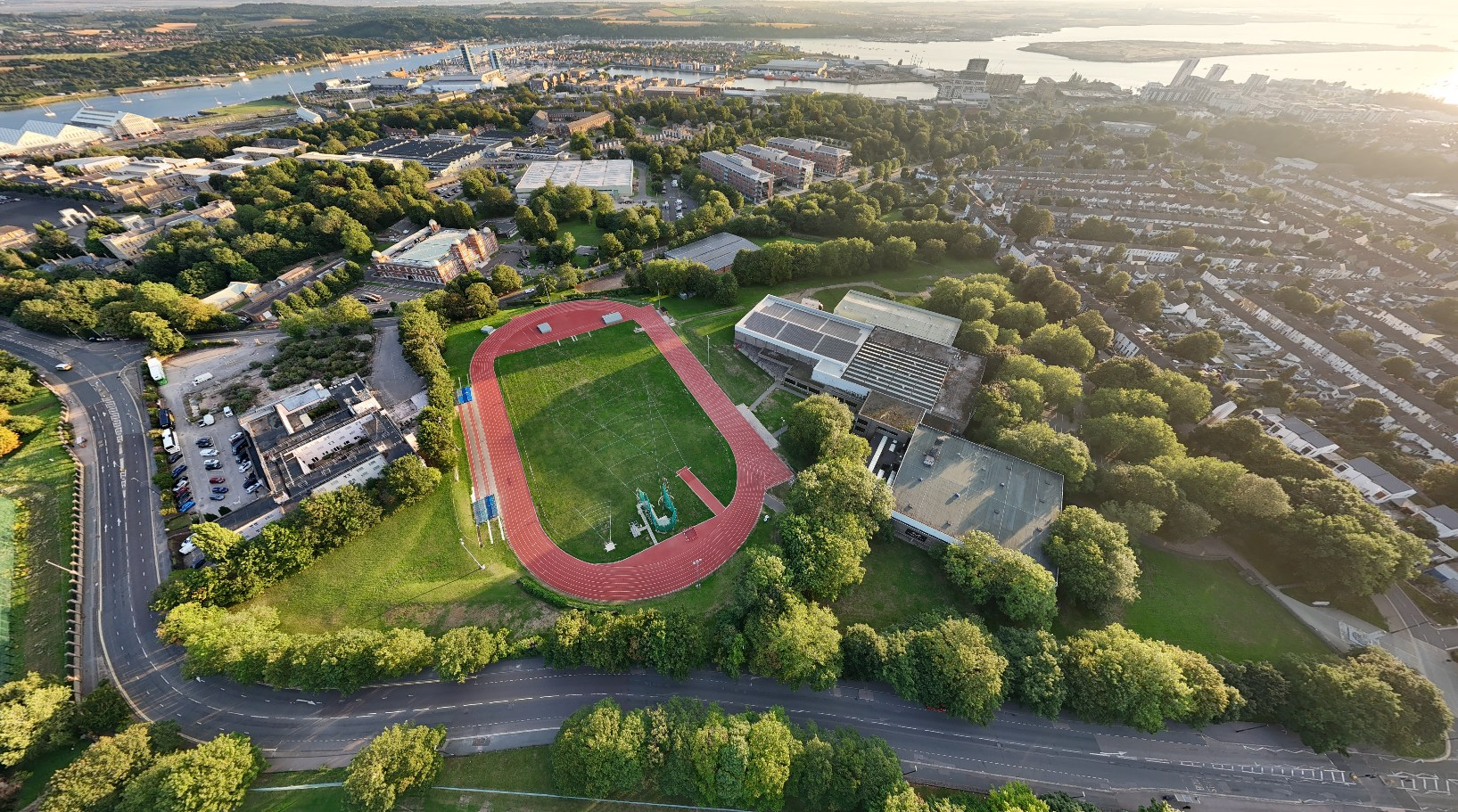
Aerial view of Medway Park Sports Centre on Brompton Road, Gillingham.

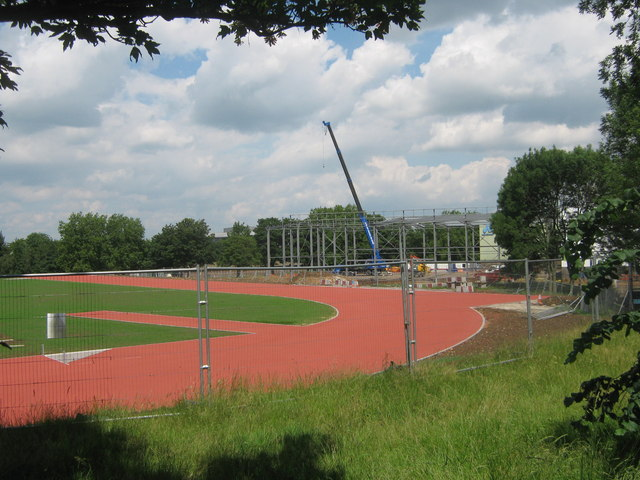
Medway Park sports track under construction in 2009

Formerly the Black Lion Leisure Centre. Now called 'Medway Park Sports Centre' and the sports areas around it, would have been farmland during the 18th century forming part of the medieval manor of 'Westcourt Farm'. The site of where the manor house was located is now used by the United Services rugby pitches (opposite the King Charles Hotel on Brompton Road).

In 1709, by an Act of Parliament, the Government compulsorily purchased the land in 'Westcourt', along with a part of Upberry Manor and some land in Chatham, for the building of the Dockyard defences and the lines. Edward Hasted notes "Westward of the village (of Gillingham) is Upberry and the manor house of Westcourt; beyond which the ground ascends to the summit of the chalk hill, on which is the town of Brompton"

The public house was originally a farmhouse (at the junction of Gillingham Lane and Spray Lane). The first record of the inn is in 1766. The licensee was John Huggins, then in 1768 Daniel Coombes took over ownership of the pub. Then in 1769, the government decided to extend the 'field of fire' of the Chatham Lines. They bought land beside the Lines, converting it into farmland, which they leased out for the next 20 years. The inn's lease expired so the owner acquired a new plot of land outside of the field of fire land (about 16 foot). The timber-structure was then re-built along Mill Road (which was then known as Fox Lane). It later was called the Black Lion Hotel. In 1896, it was re-built of brick. In the 1920s, the name was changed to the Black Lion, after the licensee (Mr Cockrill) appealed to the brewers. The farm fields around the pub, were known as the 'Black Lion Fields'. In the 1970s, the sports centre was built on the fields and named after the fields.

In December 2007, worked started on a 3-year refurbishment on the leisure centre, costing £11.1million. A new purpose-built gymnastics centre and an eight-lane athletics track was built. This 'regional centre of sporting excellence', was completed in 2010.

It was then opened on 28 July 2011 by Princess Anne. Following the opening the park hosted the 2011 European Modern Pentathlon Championships.

During, the 2012 London Olympics, it was used as a training centre for 2012 Olympics overseas' teams including the Senegal Team. The Paralympic Association of Barbados and Portuguese trampolining squad have also signed agreements to train for the Olympics at Medway Park and the neighbouring Jumpers Rebound Centre respectively.

The Black Lion public house, closed as a pub in March 2013.

In the Autumn of 2013, Medway Park hosted the 2013 Wheelchair Rugby League World Cup Final.

In June 2014, 'Medway and Maidstone Athletic Club' held the first local competition on the athletics track.

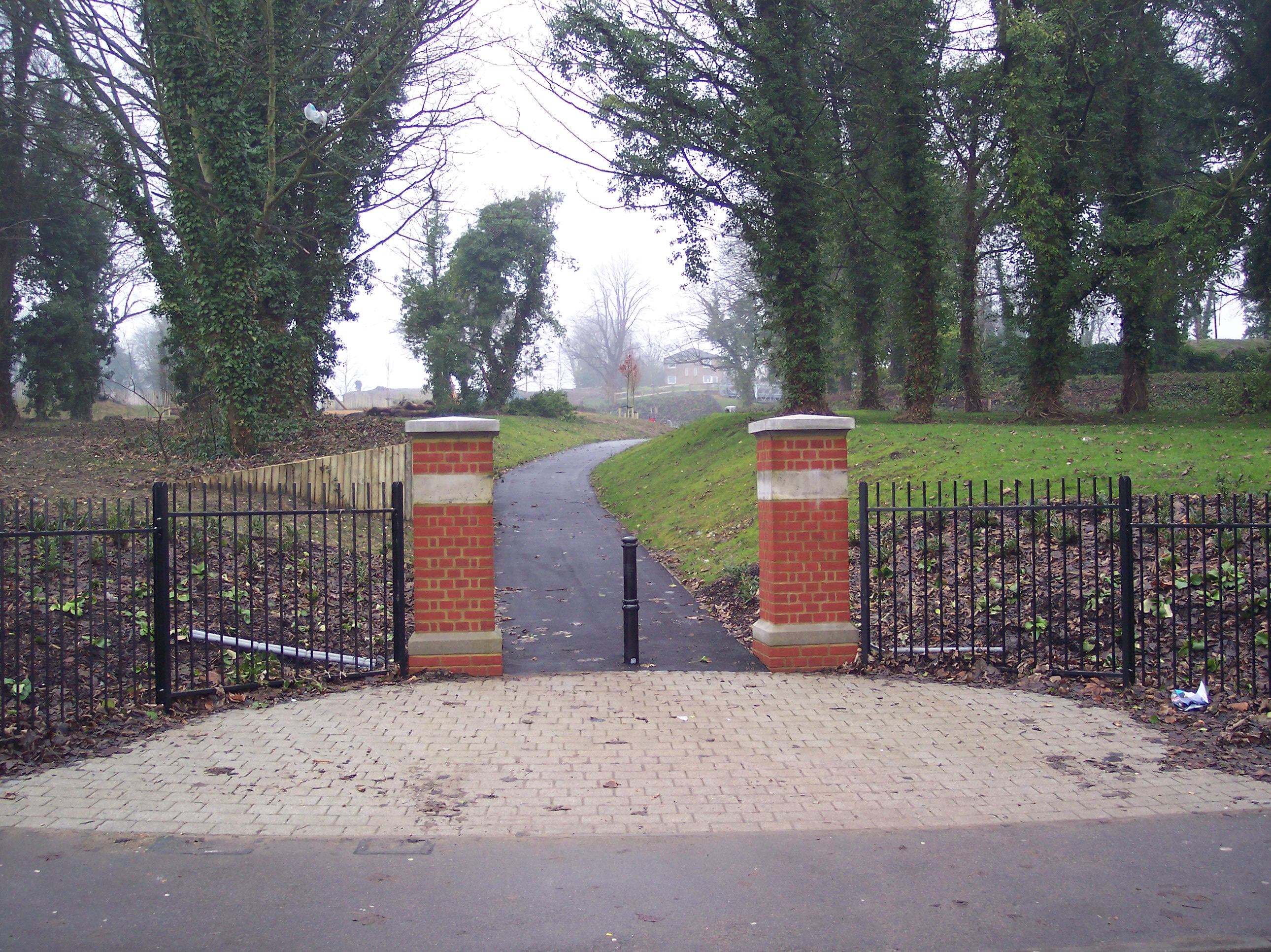
Entrance to the Lower Lines Park from Johnson Avenue

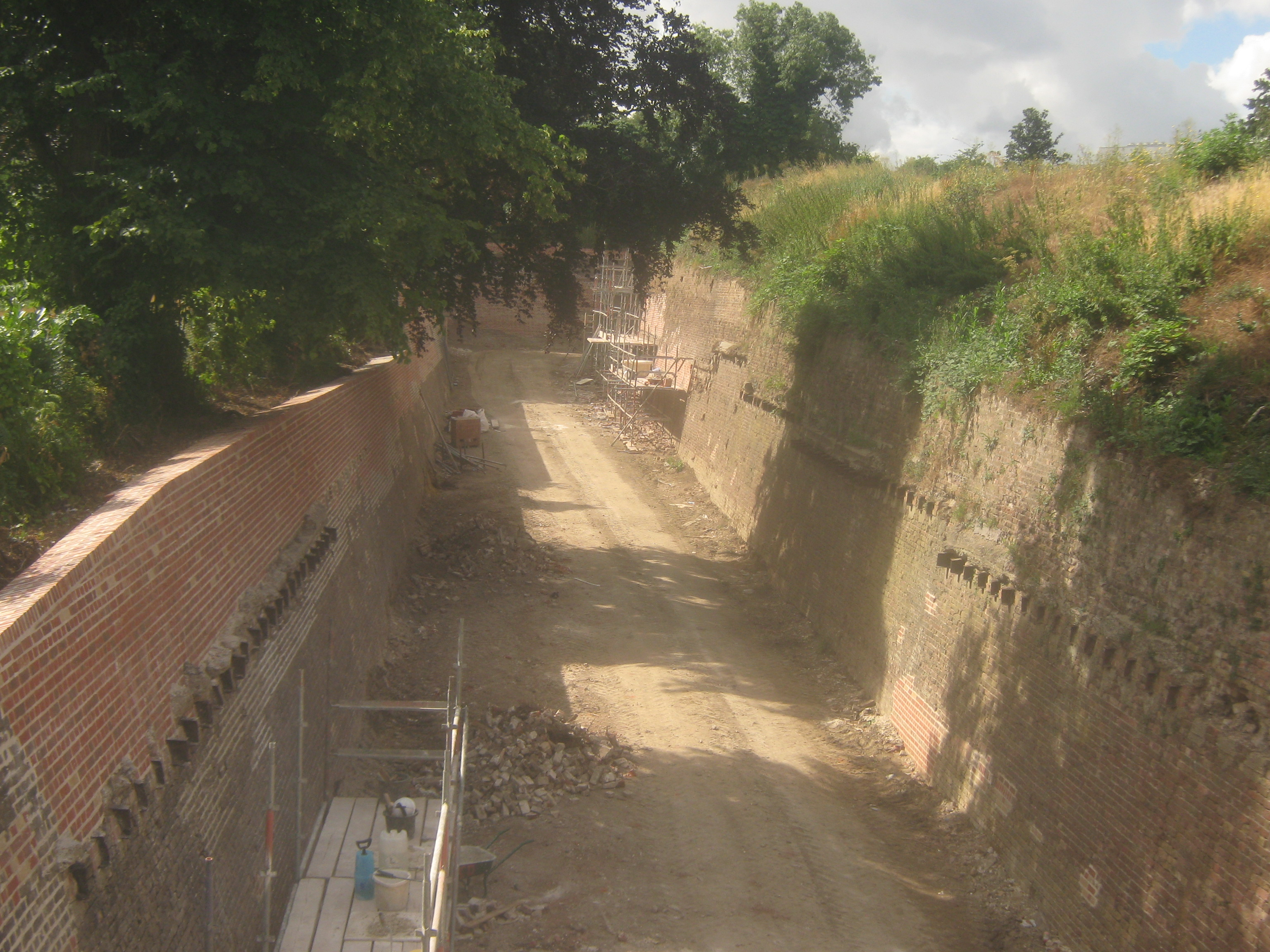
This ditch is part of the Napoleonic Ditch running from Fort Amherst to St Mary's Creek. This last section (the Lower Lines) was built in 1755. When the park opened in 2010, the lines were repaired.

== The Lower Lines ==
The Lower Lines were built in 1804 as an extension of the 1755 Chatham Lines. They are deep brick-lined ditches and are a scheduled monument.

In 1808, a road was closed for their construction. Later, they were used by Royal Engineers for training.

During WWII, tunnels beneath became HQ for the Commander-in-Chief, The Nore and HMS Wildfire.

Remains of wartime AA guns and anti-tank defences survive and are listed.

From 1964 to 1983, the tunnels were reused by the Royal Naval Reserve. Later damaged by fire, the tunnels were sealed.

In 2008, £2m was invested to create Lower Lines Park. MidKent College added £7m. Opened in January 2010 and officially launched in June 2010, the 5.5-hectare park includes trails, play areas, and historic signage.

The park is maintained by the Lower Lines Trust and supported by volunteers.

== Heritage Park ==
In 2008, funding of £2 million was awarded by the Government's Parklands Thames Gateway Fund (via Margaret Beckett, Minister for the Thames Gateway) to develop the area into a Park. A further £74,000 from EU funding (via HMS2 'Heritage and maritime memories in the 2 seas region' project), for lighting of the Chatham Naval Memorial on the Field of Fire, Fort Amherst and signage across the Park was also received.

The park team carried out a large residents and land owners consultation exercise, to find priorities and to unite the area as The Great Lines Heritage Park. The feedback exercise was ended in March 2011. With the main priorities of the park being 'Make the park accessible and feel safe' and Restore the Fort (Amherst) and to create an attractive space with strong pedestrian links promoting sustainable movement of people across Medway. The Park, alongside Chatham Historic Dockyard and Upnor Castle was to play a major part in Chatham's bid for World Heritage Status.

But in 2014, the World heritage Status was not going to be put forward for nomination by the UK Government. It lost out to the Lake District national park in Cumbria, to be decided in 2017.

== Awards ==
The park was a winner in the Local Landscape Planning category and Highly Commended in the Heritage and Conservation category at the Landscape Institute Awards 2011.

In August 2013, the Park received its first Green Flag Award.
