= Pentagon (disambiguation) =

A pentagon is a five-sided polygon.

Pentagon or the Pentagon may also refer to:

== Places ==
=== United States ===
- The Pentagon, the headquarters of the United States Department of Defense in Arlington County, Virginia, US
  - United States Department of Defense, as a metonym
  - Pentagon Memorial, a permanent memorial to 9/11 victims
  - Pentagon station, a Washington Metro station
- Sanford Pentagon, an indoor sports arena in Sioux Falls, South Dakota

=== Elsewhere ===
- Pentagon (Brussels), the historical city centre of Brussels, delimited by the "small ring"
- Pentagon (Wiesbaden), the historical city centre of Wiesbaden, Germany
- Pentagon Shopping Centre, a shopping centre in Chatham, Kent, England
  - Pentagon bus station, a defunct bus station located within the Pentagon Shopping Centre
- Pentagono del Buontalenti, in Livorno, Italy

== Music ==
- Pentagon (Japanese band)
- Pentagon (South Korean band)
- The Pentagon (album), a 1976 album by pianist Cedar Walton

== People ==
- Pentagón, a professional wrestling character in lucha libre
- Pentagón Jr. (born 1985), Mexican masked professional wrestler

== Other uses ==
- Pentagon (computer), a Soviet clone of the ZX Spectrum computer
- Pentagon Mountain, a mountain in Montana, USA
- Pentagon Papers, a United States Department of Defense history of the United States' political and military involvement in Vietnam from 1945 to 1967
- 2022–2023 Pentagon document leaks, two sets of leaked classified foreign intelligence documents of the United States
- Pentagon (film), a 2023 Indian Kannada-language film

== See also ==
- Bamboo Pentagon, a mythical secret headquarters of the Viet Cong
- Pentacon
- Pentaconn
