= Pentagon Station (disambiguation) =

Pentagon station is a station on the Washington Metro.

Pentagon Station may also refer to:

- Pentagon City Station, a station on the Washington Metro
- Chatham Pentagon bus station, a bus station in Chatham, United Kingdom
