= Chatham and District Light Railways Company =

Tramway operator in England

Operation
- Locale: Chatham
- Open: 17 June 1902
- Close: 30 September 1930
- Status: Closed

Infrastructure
- Track gauge: 3 ft 6 in (1,067 mm)
- Propulsion system: Electric
- Depot: Luton High Street

Statistics
- Route length: 14.98 miles (24.11 km)

The Chatham and District Light Railways Company was the originator and first operator of the electric tramway system that served Chatham and Gillingham, and was later extended into Rochester, Strood and Rainham. It was authorised by the Chatham and District Light Railways Order 1899. The system was in operation from 17 June 1902 to 30 September 1930, when it was superseded by the motorbuses of the Chatham and District Traction Company.

== Principal routes ==
At its inauguration the tramway had the following routes:

- Luton to the Dockyard via Chatham Town Hall.
- Chatham Cemetery to Gillingham Victoria Bridge via Chatham Town Hall and Brompton.
- Chatham Town Hall to Gillingham Pier Road via Chatham Hill, Gillingham and James Street.
- Chatham Railway station to the dockyard via Chatham Town Hall.

The network expanded for several years, and by 1908 there were eight operational routes:

- Luton to the Dockyard via Chatham Town Hall.
- Frindsbury to Gillingham Green via Rochester, Chatham Town Hall and Brompton.
- Strood Hill to Gillingham Green via Rochester, Chatham Town Hall and Brompton.
- Borstal to Gillingham Victoria Bridge via the Delce, Rochester, Chatham Town Hall and Brompton.
- Chatham Town Hall to Gillingham Shalders Arms via Chatham Hill and Canterbury Street.
- Chatham Cemetery to Gillingham Victoria Bridge via Chatham Town Hall and Brompton.
- Chatham Town Hall to Rainham High Street via Chatham Hill, Jezreels and Rainham Mark.
- Chatham Railway Station to Brompton via Chatham Town Hall.

(Note that "the Delce" referred to the area at the junction of Priestfields and Maidstone Road where Upper Delce Farm and Delce Grange were located. It did not refer to Delce Road which is locally known as the Delce.)

== Depot ==
Grid reference TQ 77284 66645

The system's depot, which included a shed with a capacity of fifty tramcars, a boiler house and generating house, and an office building, was located to the south of Luton High Street opposite Christchurch.

After the closure of the tramway system the depot, with its original sheds and workshops, was used for buses until November 1995. In 1998–99 the depot was demolished, and the site redeveloped for housing. Its role in the C&DLRCo is commemorated by the name of its access road, "Tramways".

== Tramcars ==
1/16th scale model of a Chatham tram

Tramcars had a light green and ivory livery, and there were changes to the detailing of the paint scheme over the life of the tram system.

In earlier years "Chatham & District Light Railways Co" was written in large ornate letters along the full length of the ivory side panel.

The tram model shows the scheme as it was in later years. The ornate lettering had gone.

When the system closed all the tramcars were driven to a section of track opposite the Star Hotel in Gillingham to await their fate. The Chatham Observer newspaper recorded at the time that although most of the fleet was scrapped, some went on to live a few more years as static facilities in various Kent locations:

- 30 - Broken up for scrap
- 1 - Snodhurst Farm, Walderslade Road, Chatham. Converted into a summer house for Miss Auger, the farmer's daughter. Given a rock garden surround. A stove was installed on the driver's platform.
- 4 - Minster, Sheppey. Converted into two bungalows, but the scheme was stopped by objections from the council surveyor.
- 4 - Farm near Margate. "Comfortable dwelling for farm worker".
- 6 - Lidsing. Mr Pye installed these on his property as storage sheds. (The book "Lost Tramways of Kent" has a photograph of the inner saloon of car 52 at Abbey Court Farm, Lidsing in 1953.)
- 1 - Chatham. Supper stall named The Little Nippy.
- 2 - Roadside between Sittingbourne and Faversham. Converted into roadside coffee stalls.
- 2 - Star Farm, Gillingham. The farmer, Mr Harris, did not subsequently use them.

== See also ==
- List of town tramway systems in the United Kingdom
