= Chatham, Kent =

Town in Kent, England

Coordinates: 51.37°N 0.52°E

Chatham
- Town
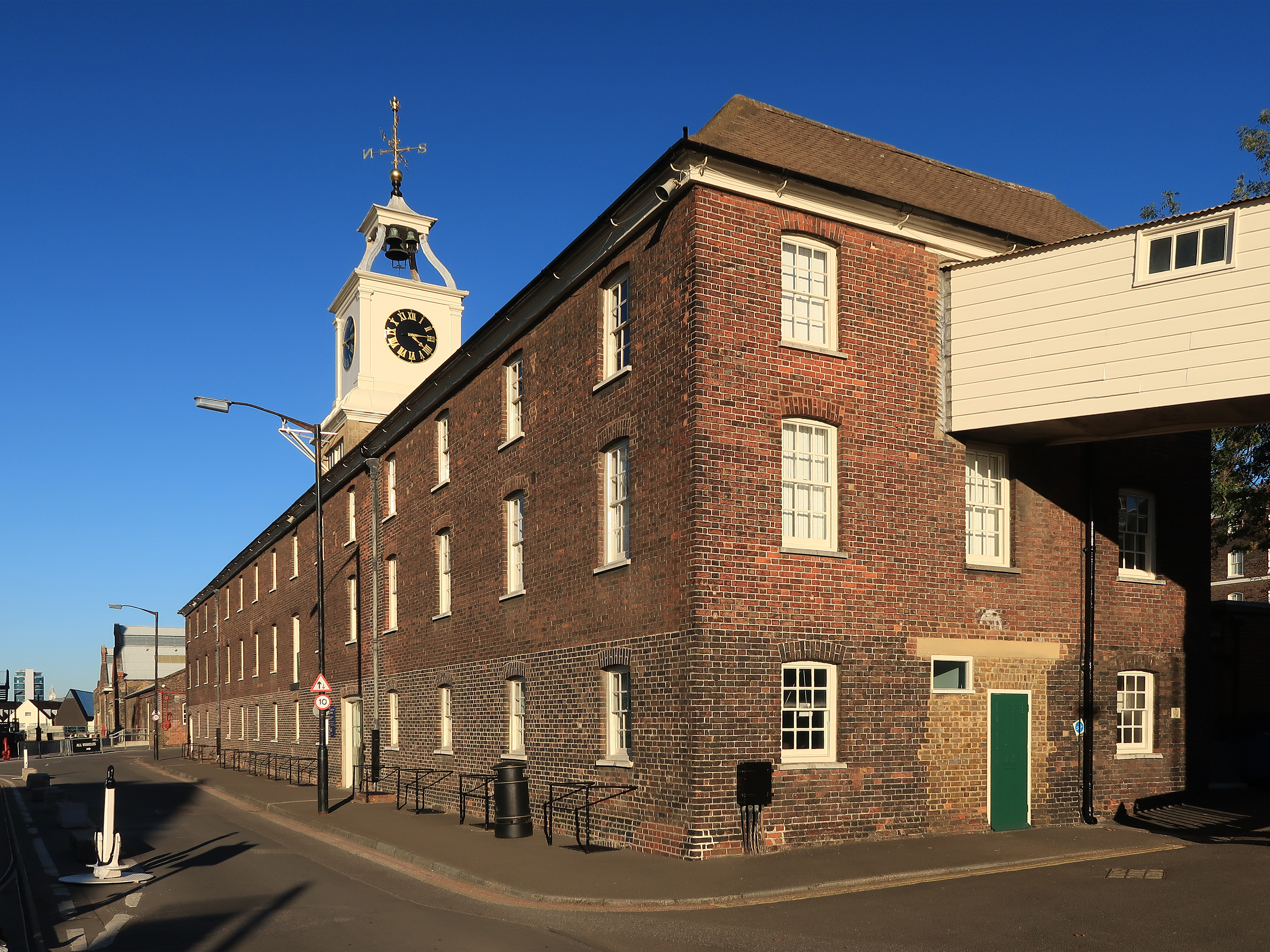
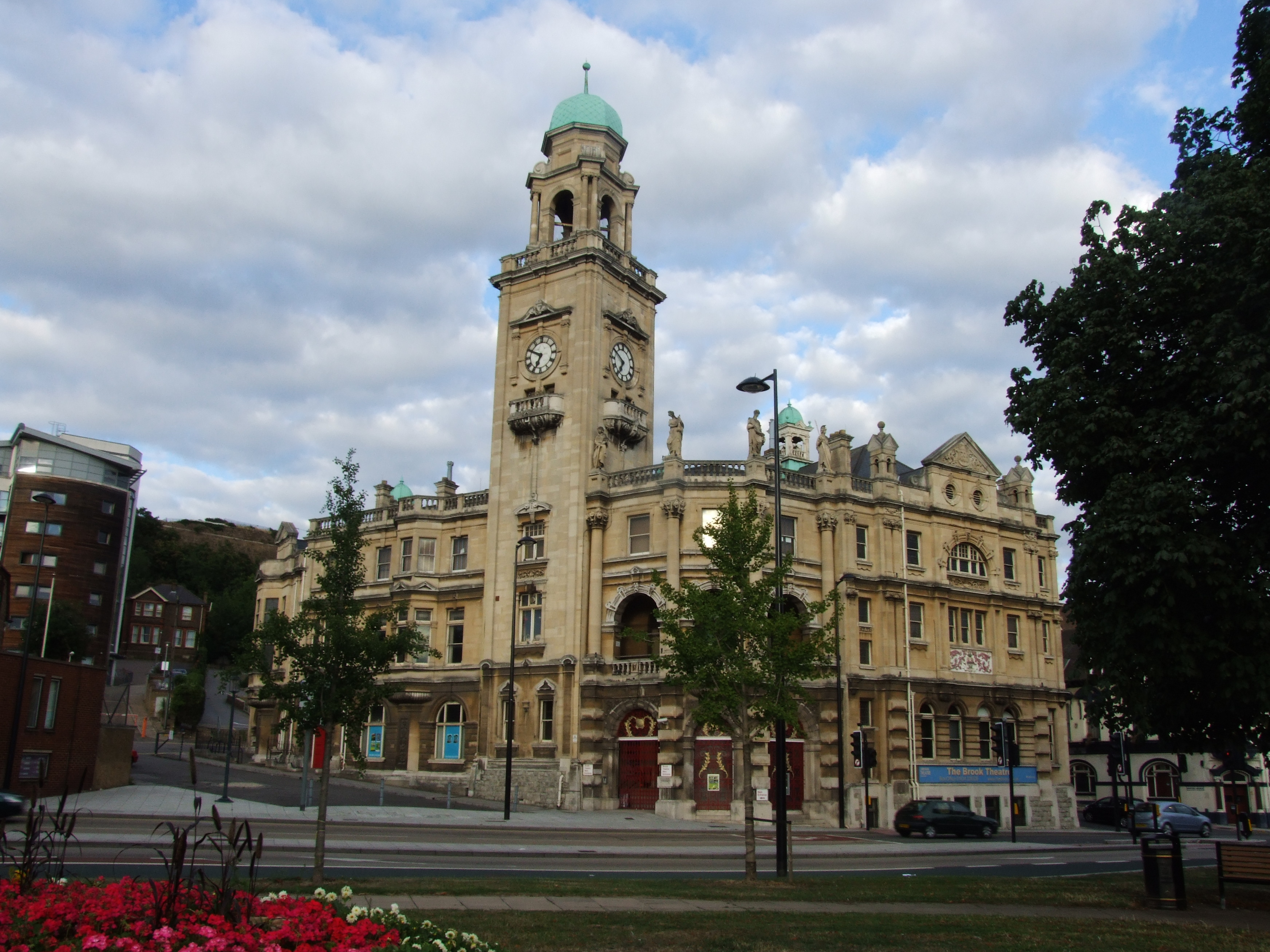
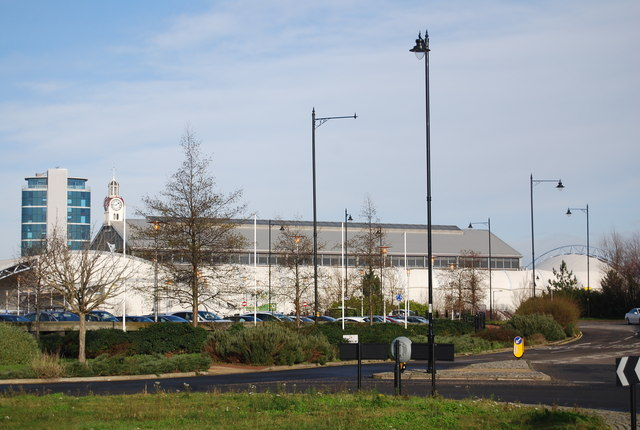
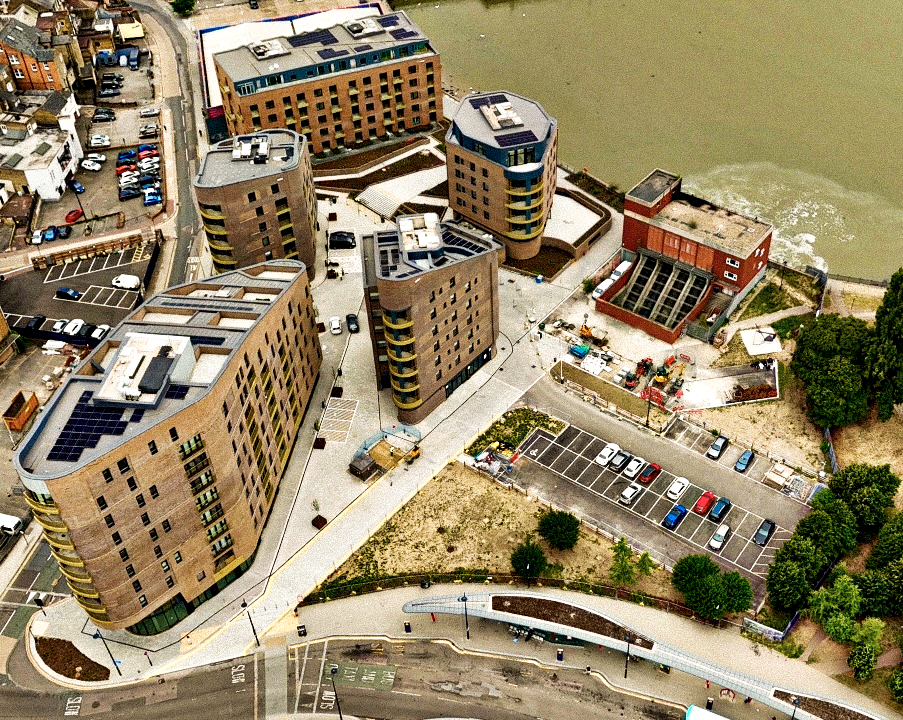
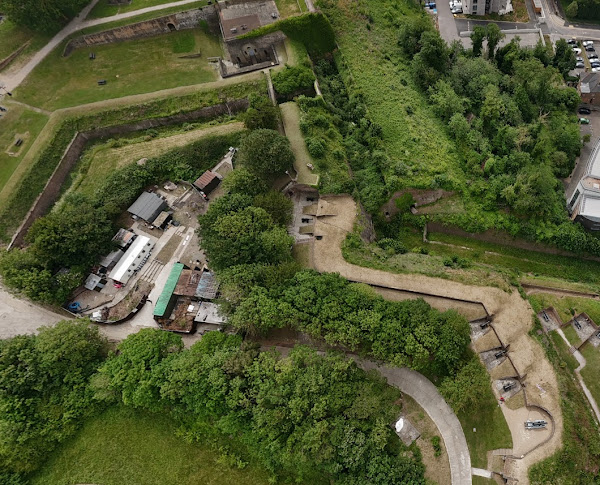
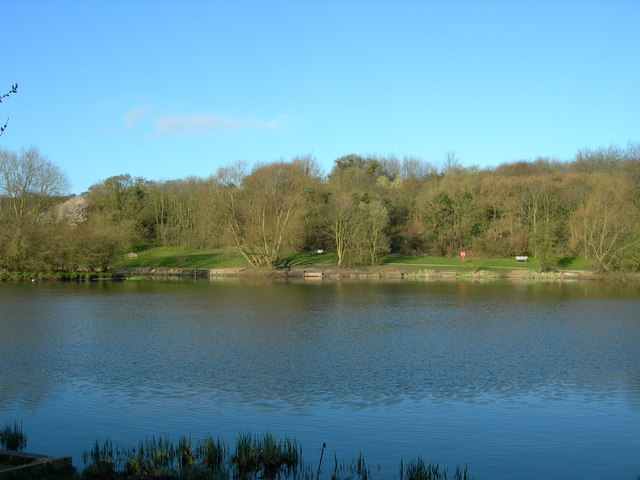
- Chatham Historic Dockyard Chatham Town Hall Dockside Outlet Centre Chatham Waterfront Fort Amherst Capstone Farm Country Park

- Coat of arms of Chatham

- Location within Kent
- Population: 80,596 (2020 ONS)
- OS grid reference: TQ765659
  - London: 33 mi (53 km) WNW
- Unitary authority: Medway
- Ceremonial county: Kent
- Region: South East
- Country: England
- Sovereign state: United Kingdom
- Post town: CHATHAM
- Postcode district: ME4, ME5
- Dialling code: 01634
- Police: Kent
- Fire: Kent
- Ambulance: South East Coast
- UK Parliament: Chatham and Aylesford

Chatham (/ˈtʃætəm/ CHAT-əm) is a town within the Medway unitary authority in the ceremonial county of Kent, England. It forms a conurbation with the neighbouring towns of Gillingham, Rochester, Strood and Rainham, and had a population of 80,596 in 2020.

The town developed around Chatham Dockyard, established as a Royal Naval Dockyard in 1567, along with barracks for the British Army and the Royal Navy. A chain of defensive fortifications, including Fort Amherst (begun 1756) and expanded during the Napoleonic Wars, was constructed to protect the dockyard from land-based attack. The Corps of Royal Engineers remains based at Brompton Barracks.

The dockyard closed on 31 March 1984 after more than four centuries of continuous operation. Part of the site was subsequently developed as a commercial port, other parts redeveloped for business and residential use, and 84 acres preserved as the Chatham Historic Dockyard museum, the most complete dockyard of the Age of Sail in the world. Its exhibits include the warships HMS Gannet, HMS Cavalier, and the submarine HMS Ocelot.

Chatham is the administrative headquarters of Medway Council and the principal retail centre of the Medway area. Chatham railway station and Chatham Waterfront bus station serve as the main transport interchanges for the wider conurbation.

== Toponymy ==
The name Chatham is first attested in a charter of 880 (surviving in a twelfth-century manuscript); it appears again in a charter of 975 as Cætham, and in the Domesday Book of 1086 as Ceteham. The first element of the name comes from the Common Brittonic word that survives in Modern Welsh as Coed ("Woodland"). The second element is the Old English word Hām ("Settlement"). At the point when the current name was coined, then, it meant "Settlement At Chat". The Old English term for the settlement's inhabitants is also reconstructable from a twelfth-century copy of a charter of 995, as *Cēthǣmas.

== History ==
The A2 road passes by Chatham along the line of the ancient Celtic route. It was paved by the Romans, and named Watling Street by the Anglo-Saxons. Among certain archaeological finds here have been the remains of a Roman-era cemetery.

Chatham was a long, small village on the banks of the River Medway. By the 16th century, warships were being moored at Jillingham Water (Gillingham), because of its strategic sheltered location between London and the European continent. It was established as a Royal Dockyard by Queen Elizabeth I in 1568, and most of Chatham Dockyard lies within Gillingham. Initially a refitting base, it became a shipbuilding yard; from then until the late 19th century, further expansion of the yard took place. In its time, many thousands of personnel in the Royal Navy were employed at Chatham Dockyard, and many hundreds of vessels were launched there, including HMS Victory, which was constructed from 23 July 1759 to 30 April 1762. After World War I ended on 11 November 1918 numerous submarines were also built in Chatham Dockyard.

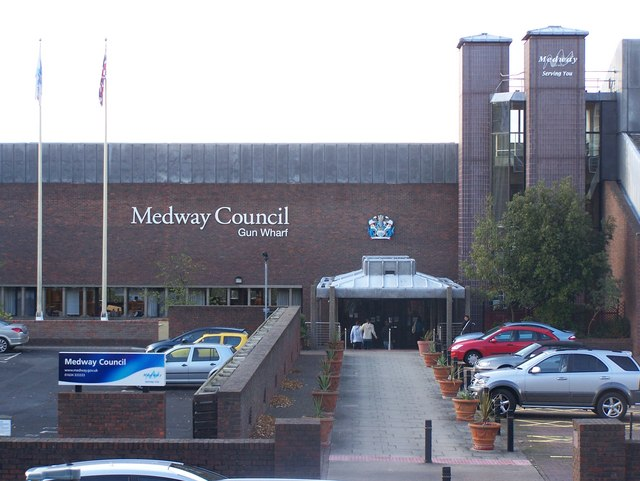
Entrance to Medway Council's offices, which are housed inside the Grade II listed Gun Wharf building, viewed from Dock Road in Chatham.

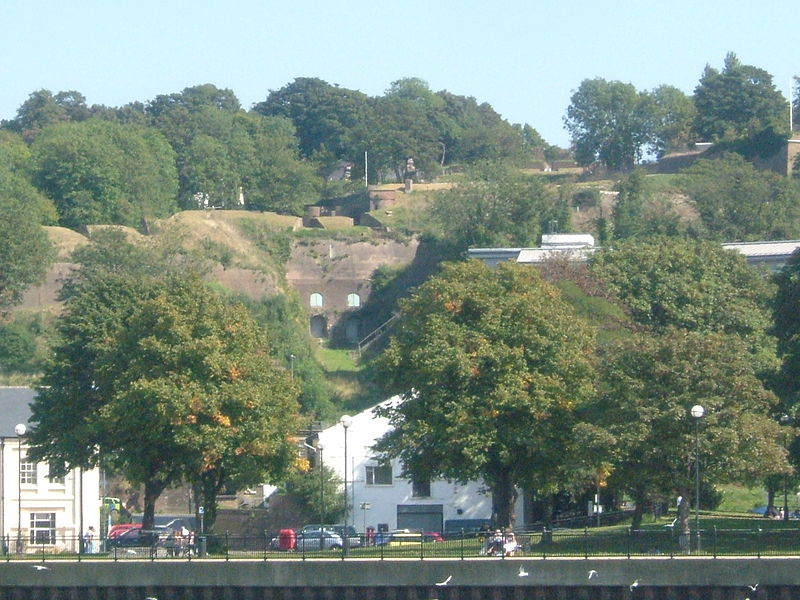
Looking from the River Medway at Riverside Gardens (next to Gun Wharf) towards the Great Barrier Ditch, to the Gun Platforms at Fort Amherst.

In addition to Chatham Dockyard, defensive fortifications were built to protect it from attack. Upnor Castle had been built in 1567, but had proved ineffectual; the Raid on the Medway by the Nederlandse Staatsmarine (Dutch States Navy) from 19 June 1667 to 24 June 1667, during the Second Anglo-Dutch War, showed that more defences were required along the banks of the River Medway. The fortifications, which became more elaborate as the threat of invasion grew because of the Seven Years' War which had started on 17 May 1756, meant further construction begun during 18 October 1756 so a complex could be form across the neck of the Medway Peninsula by the bend in the River Medway, and this included Fort Amherst. The threat of a land-based attack from across the English Channel during the 19th century led to the construction of more Napoleonic Forts along the coastline in Kent, East Sussex, West Sussex, Hampshire and Dorset.

The second phase of fortress-building happened from September 1806 to February 1819, and included Fort Pitt (later used as a General Hospital and the site of the initial Army Medical School). The 1859 Royal Commission on the Defence of the United Kingdom ordered, "Inter Alia" ("Among Other Things"), a third outer ring of Napoleonic Forts: these included Fort Luton, Fort Bridgewoods, and Fort Borstal.

These fortifications required soldiers to protect them and army barracks to house those personnel. These included Kitchener Barracks (c 1750–80), the Royal Marine Barracks (c 1780), Brompton Artillery Barracks (1806) and Melville Barracks (opened 1820 as a Naval Hospital, RM Barracks from 1905). HMS Collingwood and HMS Pembroke were both Naval Barracks.

In response to the huge manpower needs, the village of Chatham and other nearby villages and towns grew commensurately. Trams, and later buses, linked those places to bring in the workforce. The area between the High Street and Luton village illustrates part of that growth, with its many streets of Victorian terraces.

The importance of Chatham Dockyard gradually declined as the resources of the Royal Navy in the United Kingdom were reduced or moved to other locations, and eventually, on 31 March 1984, it shut. The buildings of Chatham Dockyard were preserved as the site named as Chatham Historic Dockyard (operated by Chatham Historic Dockyard Trust), which was under consideration as a World Heritage Site the site is being used for other purposes. Part of the St Mary's Island section is now used as a marina, and the remainder is being developed for housing, commercial and other uses, branded as "Chatham Maritime".

== Governance ==
Chatham lost its independence as a borough under the Local Government Act 1972, by which, on 1 April 1974, it became part of the Borough of Medway, a non-metropolitan district of the county of Kent; under subsequent renaming the borough became the Borough of Rochester-upon-Medway (1979); and, from 1982, the City of Rochester-upon-Medway. Under the most recent change, in 1998, and with the addition of the Borough of Gillingham, the Borough of Medway became a unitary authority area, administratively separate from Kent. It remains part of the county of Kent for ceremonial purposes.

Medway Council has recently moved its main administration building to Gun Wharf, the site of the earliest part of the dockyard, a former Lloyd's office building. It was built between 1976 and 1978 and is Grade II listed.

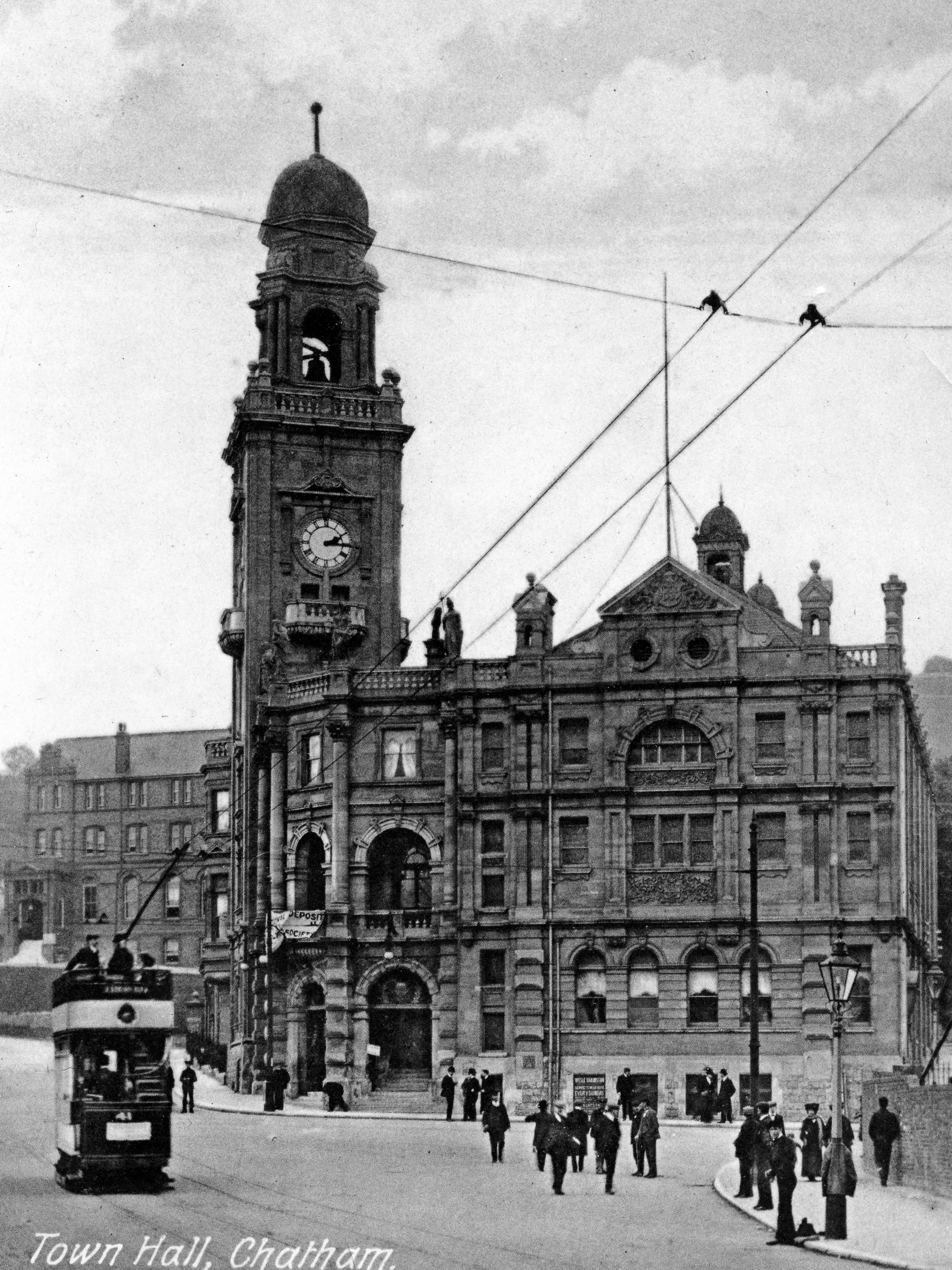
Left: Chatham Town Hall, then as it was known by, pictured c.1920. In 1997, it has hosted a theatre called The Brook Theatre, which ultimately changed the use and the name of the building.

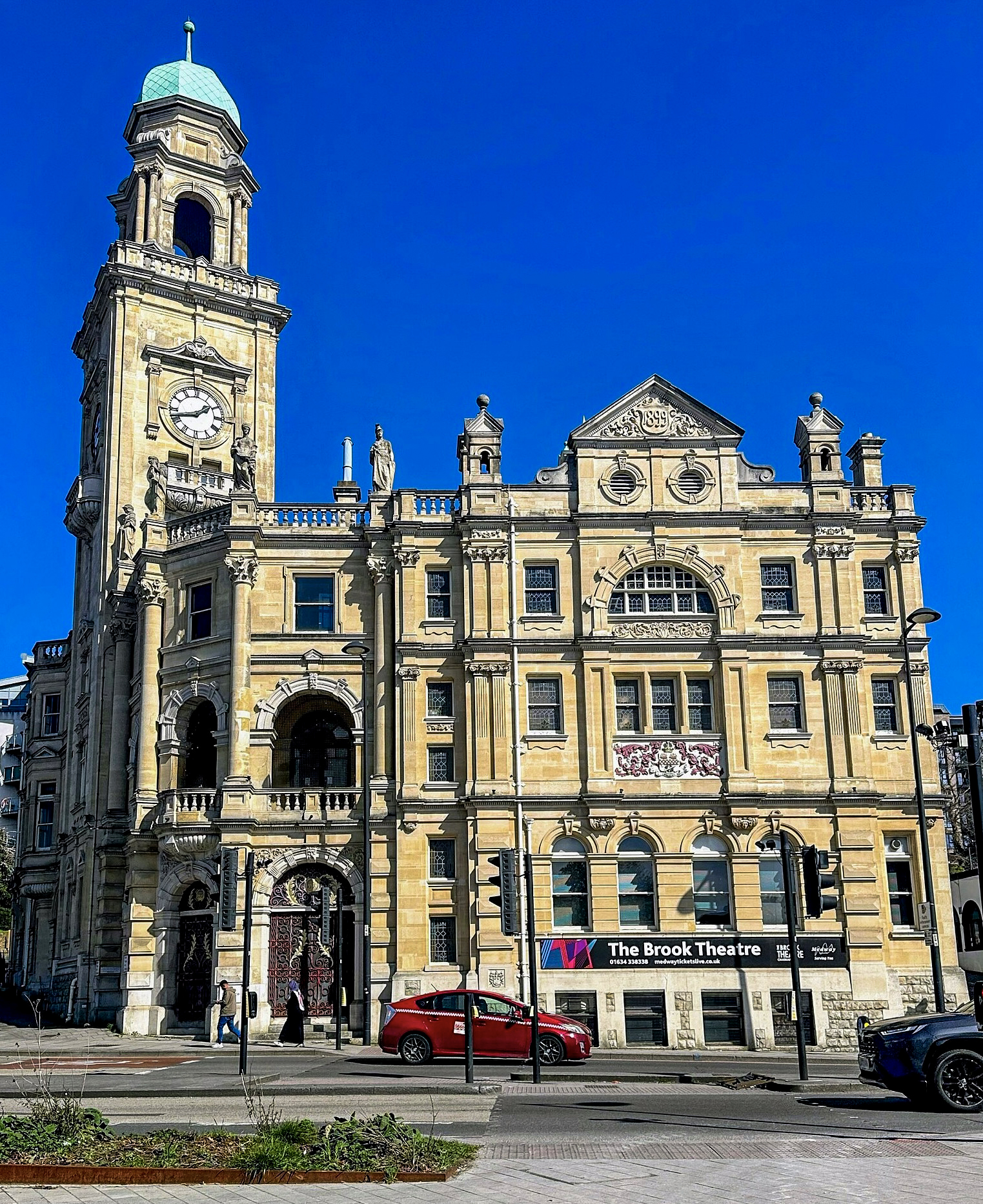
Right: The Brook Theatre in 2025, still maintaining its glory, pictured at one of Dock Road's pedestrian crossings.

Chatham is part of the parliamentary constituency of Chatham and Aylesford. Before 1997, Chatham had been included in the constituencies of Mid Kent, Rochester and Chatham and Chatham.

Chatham has proven to be a marginal parliamentary seat. Since 1945, the members of parliament for Chatham have been as follows:

| Election | Member | Party |
|---|---|---|
| 1945 | Arthur Bottomley | Labour |
| 1959 | Julian Critchley | Conservative |
| 1964 | Anne Kerr | Labour |
| 1970 | Peggy Fenner | Conservative |
| Oct 1974 | Robert Bean | Labour |
| 1979 | Peggy Fenner | Conservative |
| 1983 | Andrew Rowe | Conservative |
| 1997 | Jonathan Shaw | Labour |
| 2010 | Tracey Crouch | Conservative |
| 2024 | Tristan Osborne | Labour |

== Geography ==
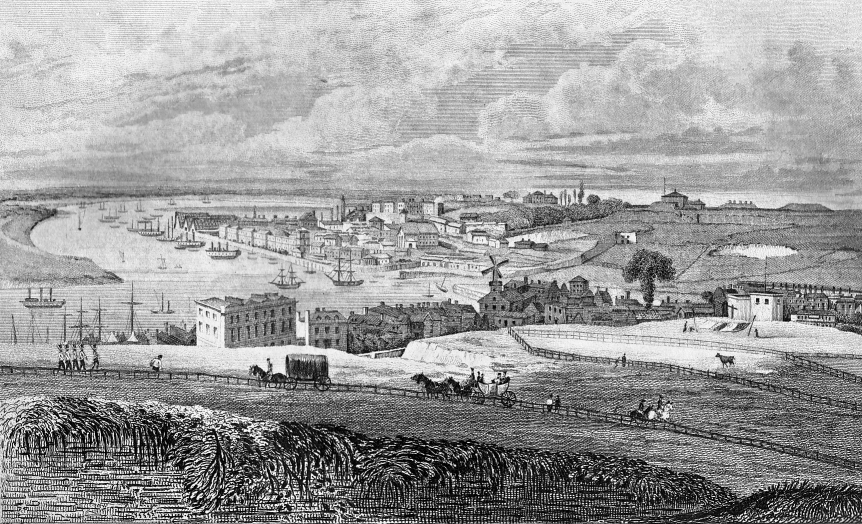
Chatham Dockyard, seen from Fort Pitt, ca. 1830.

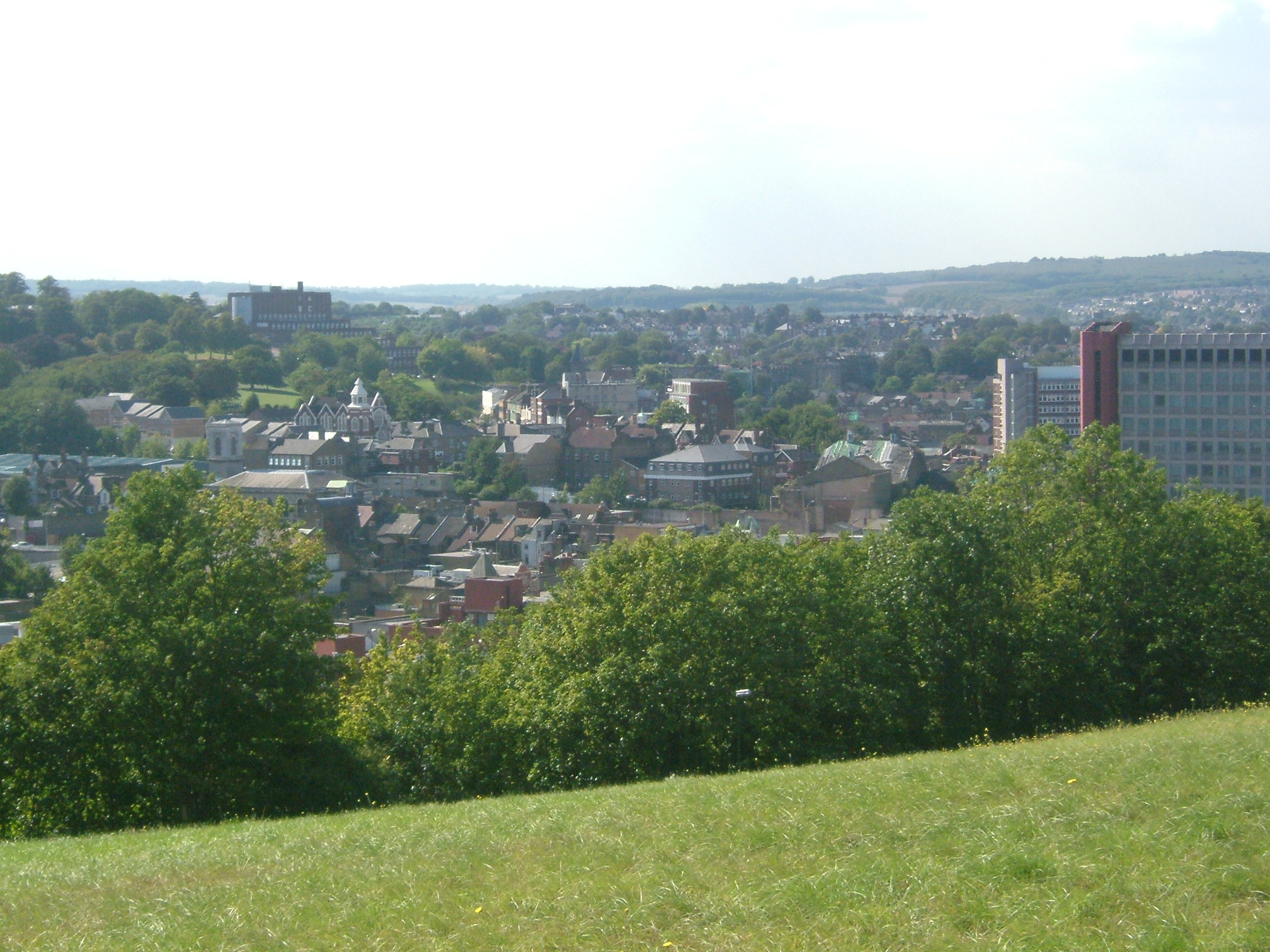
Chatham Town Centre from the Great Lines Heritage Park. The Pentagon Shopping Centre is to the right, with the building on the ridge left of centre, Fort Pitt and Rochester lies beyond that ridge; and Frindsbury is on the rising ground in the right distance.

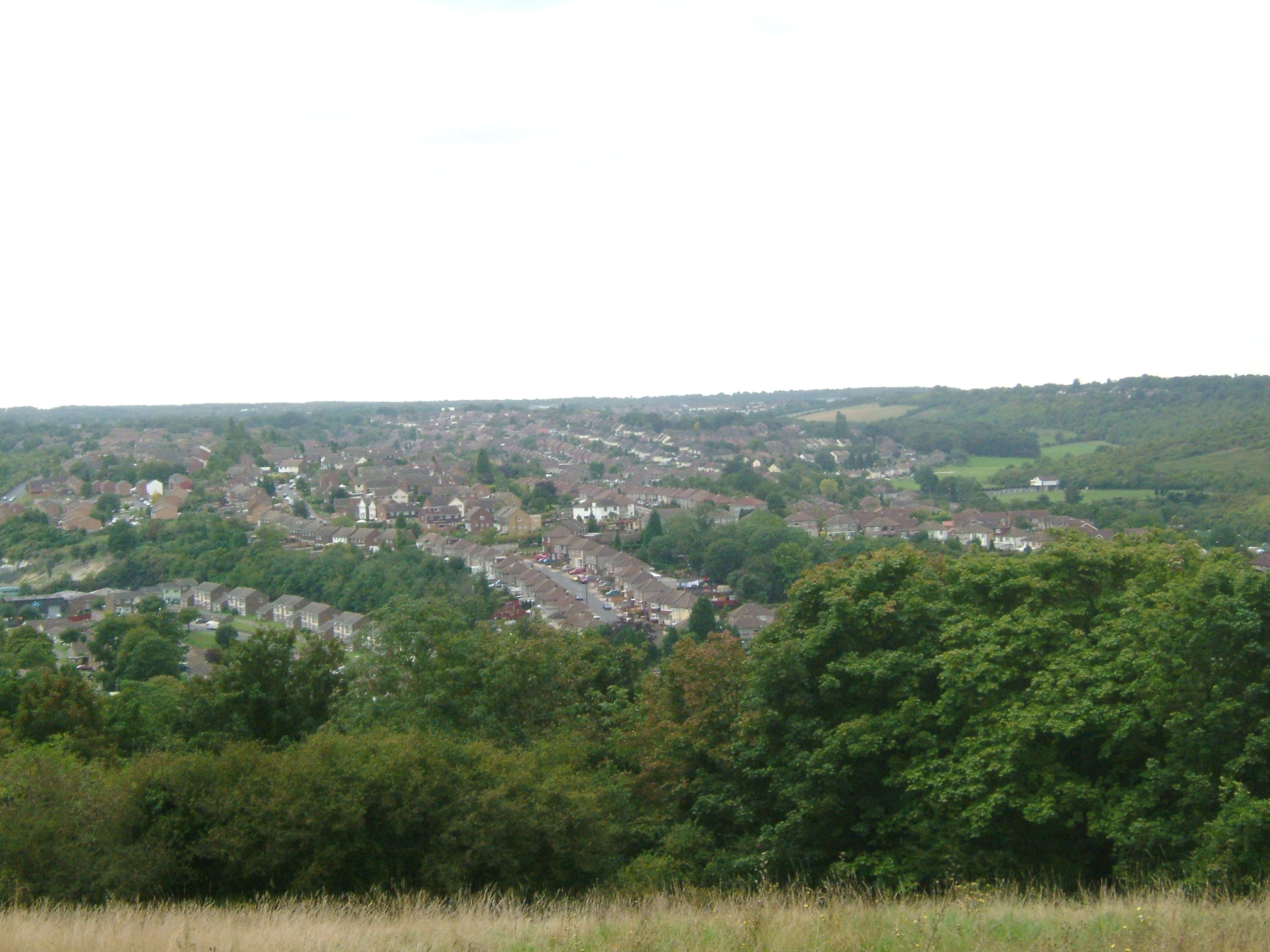
Luton Valley, from Darland Banks, seen from the Banks and looking south. This shows the village in the centre, with the rows of Victorian terraced housing, which unusually follow the contour lines.

Chatham is situated where the lower part of the dip slope of the North Downs meets the River Medway which at this point is flowing in a south–north direction. This gives the right bank, where the town stands, considerable advantages from the point of view of river use. Compared with the opposite bank, the river is fast-flowing and deep. The town lies below at river level, curving round to occupy a south-easterly trending valley (The Brook), in which lies the High Street. Beyond the Chatham Dockyard was marshy land, now called St Mary's Island, and has several new developments of housing estates. The New Road crosses the scene below the vantage point of the illustration.

The valley continues southeastwards as the Luton Valley, in which is the erstwhile village of that name; and Capstone Valley. The Darland Banks, the northern slopes of the Luton Valley above these valleys, are unimproved chalk grassland. The opposite slopes are the ‘'Daisy Banks'’ and ‘'Coney Banks'’, along which some of the defensive forts were built (including Fort Luton, in the trees to the left)

Until the start of the 20th century, most of the south part of the borough was entirely rural, with a number of farms and large tracts of woodland. The beginning of what is now Walderslade was when a speculative builder began to build the core of the village in Walderslade Bottoms.

== Demography ==
Chatham’s population expanded significantly in the 19th century as it developed into a market town in its own right, later becoming a municipal borough in 1890. By 1817, it was already described as having 1,715 houses and 10,505 inhabitants along with a Saturday market. This growth continued through the century, with the population exceeding 16,000 by 1831 and rising further to 48,800 by 1961.

== Economy ==
The closure of the Royal Navy Dockyard on 31 March 1984 had the effect of changing the employment statistics of the town. About 7,000 people lost their jobs. The unemployment rate went up to 23.5%. From early April 1984 to December 1985, and onwards, the Medway Towns began to have an increase in alcohol and drug-related, antisocial behaviour, which many residents then realized had largely been caused by the closure of the Royal Navy Dockyard on 31 March 1984, and the resulting mass redundancies. There has been a concerted effort to revitalise the Thames Gateway area and one of the largest employers in Chatham is now Vanquis Bank Ltd, a subsidiary of Vanquis Banking Group.

== Landmarks ==
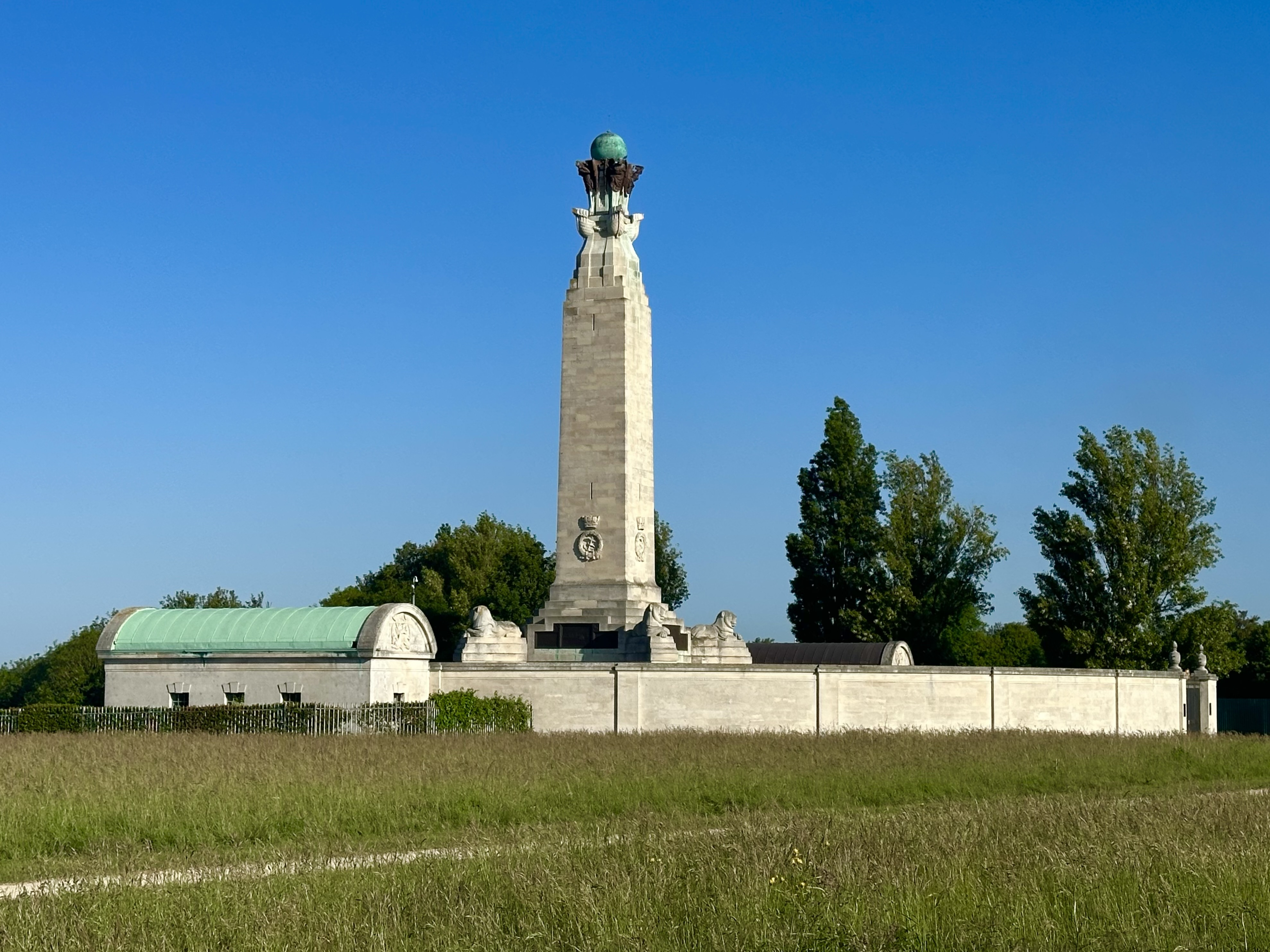
Chatham Naval Memorial

The Chatham Naval Memorial commemorates the 18,500 officers, ranks and ratings of the Royal Navy who were lost or buried at sea in World War I and World War II. The Chatham Naval Memorial was constructed from March 1924 to October 1924. The addition of the obelisk and Portland stone plaque walls and surroundings were constructed between June 1952 to October 1952. It stands on the Great Lines, the escarpment ridge between Chatham and Gillingham.

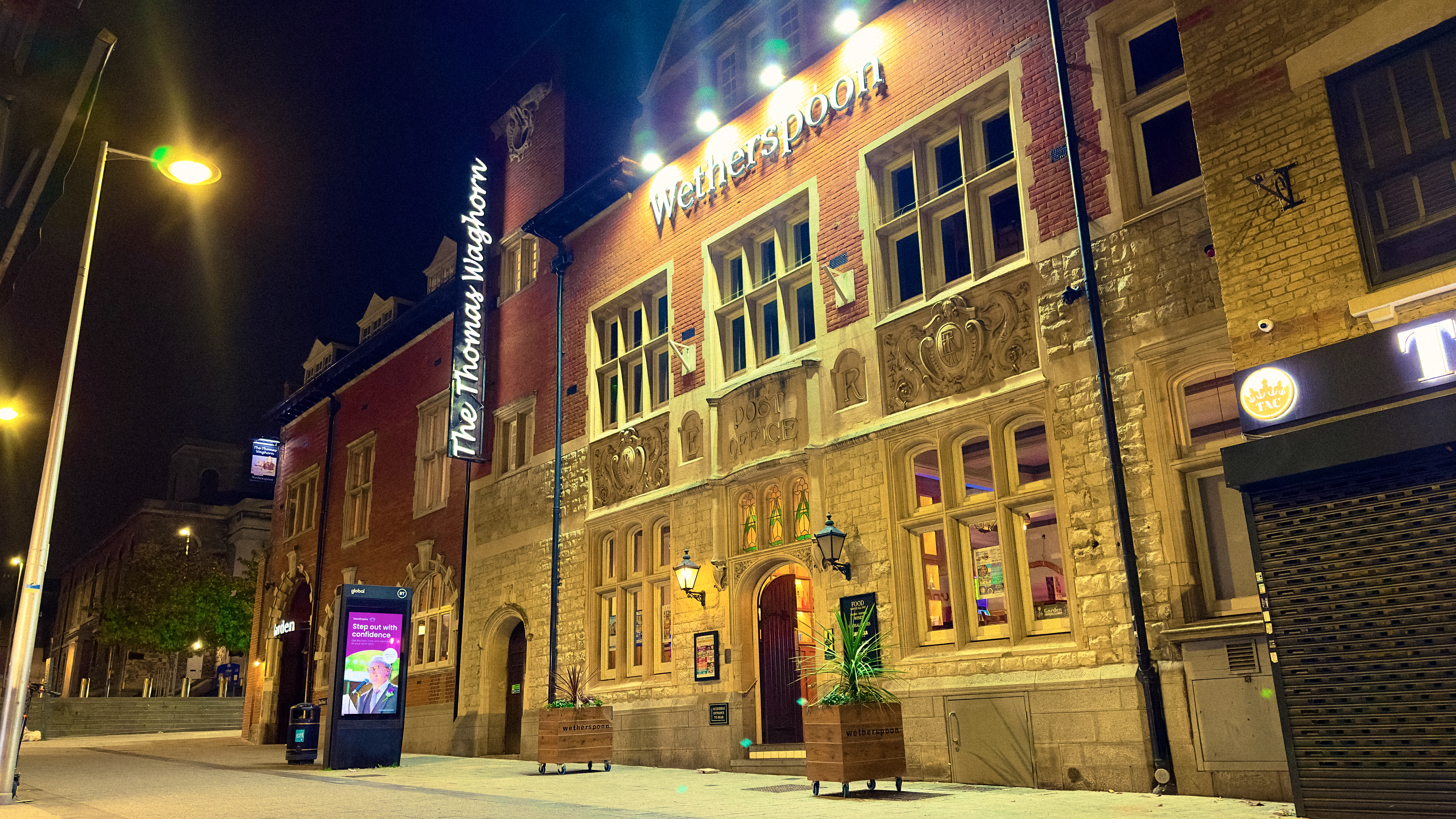
The Thomas Waghorn JD Wetherspoon pub on Railway Street, Chatham

The Grade II listed building Chatham Town Hall was built in January 1900; it stands in The Brook opposite a former public house called Churchills, and is of a unique architectural design. With Chatham being part of the Medway Towns, it took on a new role as the Medway Arts Centre on 20 April 1987, with the promotional motto "Putting The Arts Back Into The Medway". There were many events held within the Medway Arts Centre, including stage plays, craft fairs, snooker tournaments and party nights. Likewise during 12 May 1990, the Medway Arts Centre organised a large parade, composed of dancers, musicians, artists and sculptors, who stood upon theatrical lorry floats. The vehicles were initially parked up next to the entrance into the Theatre Royal Cafe, a popular restaurant in the Chatham Town Hall, on Whiffens Avenue, and then started to travel along Military Road in Chatham, and onward to Rochester, Strood and Frindsbury, where sweets, chocolate, posters, badges, plastic hats, leaflets, stickers and T-shirts were handed out to the crowds, to promote the Medway Arts Centre. On 28 April 1997, the Medway Arts Centre became The Brook Theatre.

The Pentagon Shopping Centre stands in Chatham Town Centre and serviced the Pentagon Bus Station that was closed on 30 September 2011. Chatham Waterfront bus station opened in October 2011. It replaced the previous Pentagon Bus Station in Chatham, which was opened during 16 October 1970, before the Pentagon Shopping Centre was opened on 30 June 1975, which by that time was considered an unwelcoming environment for passengers.

The Trafalgar Centre was a shopping centre on Chatham High Street. It closed in 2013 due to safety concerns, and the site was later included in a redevelopment proposal involving demolition of the former centre and partial demolition of the adjacent multi-storey car park.

The Chatham Free Library, located at 221 New Road, was the town's first purpose-built public library service. Opened on 7 October 1903, the project was a collaboration between the local corporation and philanthropist Andrew Carnegie, who provided a £4,500 grant for its construction. The building was designed in an Edwardian style by the prominent local architect George Edward Bond, who also designed the nearby Chatham Town Hall. Architecturally, the library featured a distinctive facade that complemented the civic character of New Road. It served as Chatham's primary literary and educational hub for nearly 70 years. However, by the mid-20th century, the building suffered from significant structural decay, specifically severe dry rot. This led to its permanent closure in 1971. Despite local interest in its preservation, the building was demolished in 1984. The site was subsequently redeveloped for social housing, now known as Five Ways Court.

== Transport ==
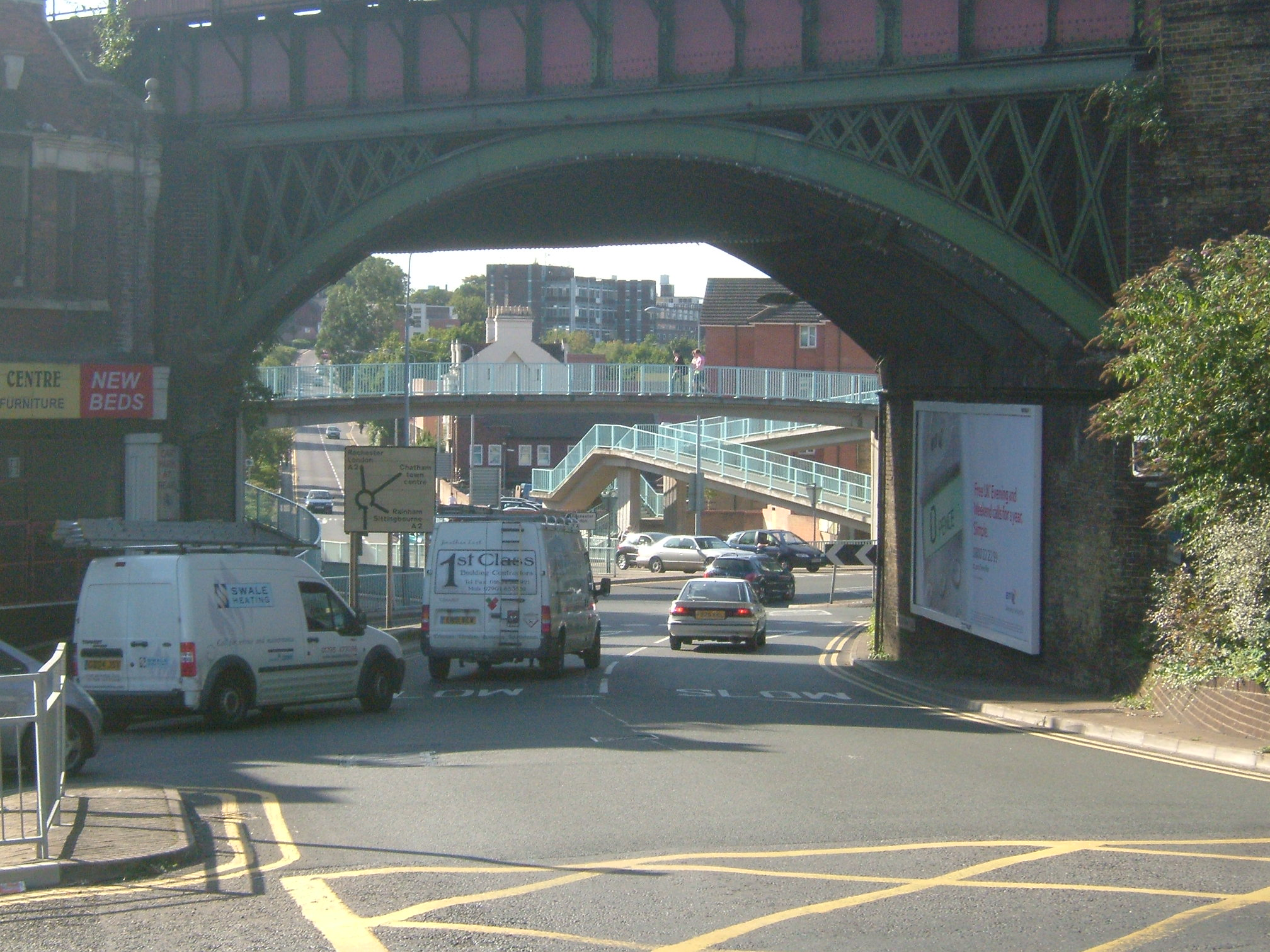
The A2 road at Luton Arches. The New Road runs underneath the Luton Arches Footbridge.

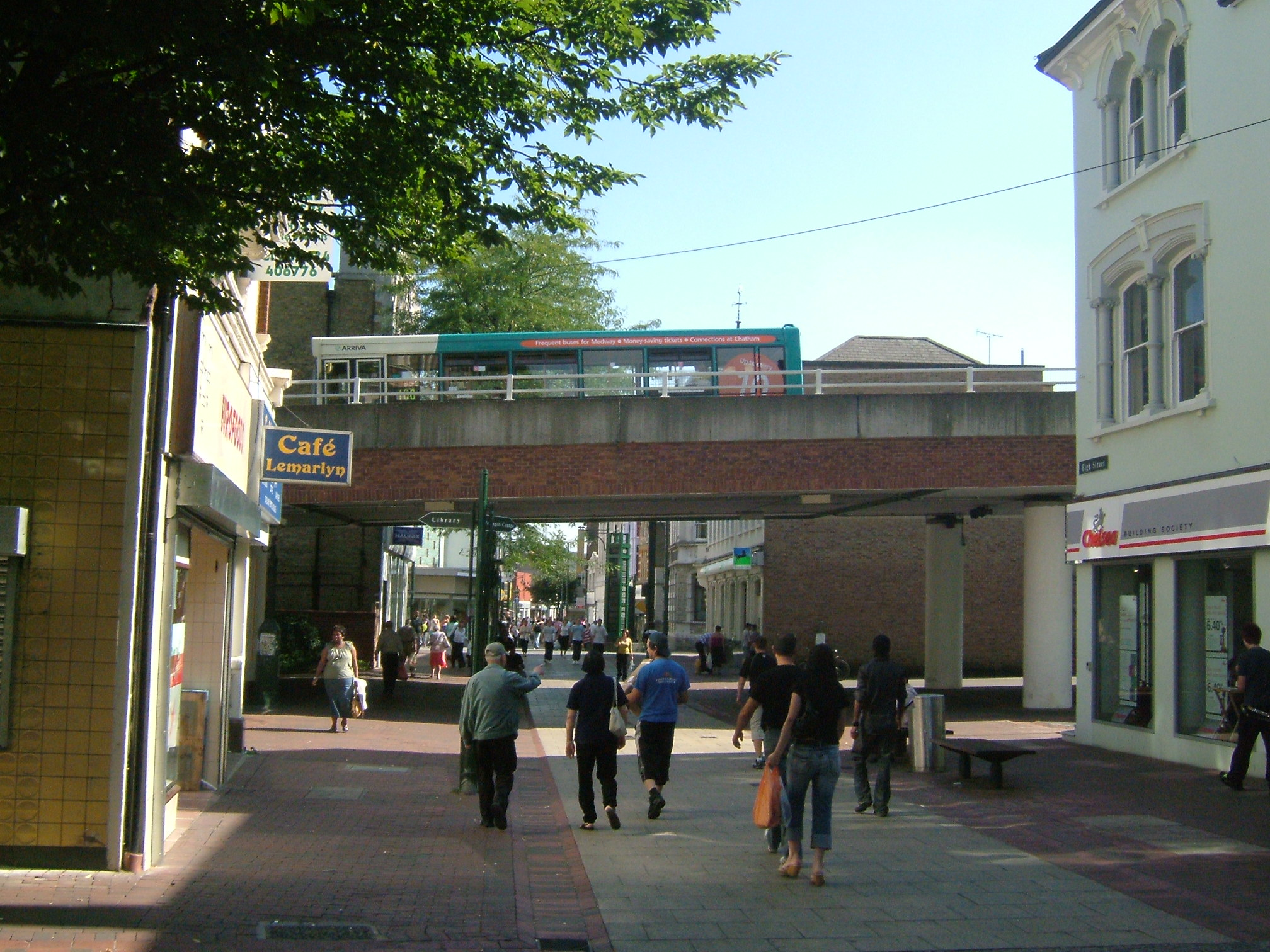
Sir John Hawkins Flyover, which was demolished in 2009.

The Medway, apart from Chatham Dockyard, has always had an important role in communication: historically it provided a means for the transport of goods to and from the interior of Kent. Stone, timber and iron from the Weald for shipbuilding and agricultural produce were among the cargoes. Sun Pier in Chatham was one of many such along the river. By 1740, barges of forty tons could navigate as far upstream as Tonbridge. Today its use is confined to tourist traffic; apart from the marina, there are many yacht moorings on the river itself.

The position of the road network in Chatham began with the building of the Roman Road (Watling Street, which passed through the town. Turnpike trusts were established locally, so that the length from Chatham to Canterbury was turnpiked in 1730; and the Chatham to Maidstone Road (now the A230) was also turnpiked before 1750. The High Street was bypassed in 1769, by the New Road (see illustration (1)) leading from the top of Star Hill Rochester, to the bottom of Chatham Hill at Luton Arches. This also became inadequate for the London cross-channel traffic and the Medway Towns Bypass, the M2 motorway, was constructed to divert through traffic south of the Medway Towns.

Chatham is the hub of the Medway Towns. This fact means that the existing roadway system has always proved inadequate for the amount of traffic it has to handle, and various schemes have been tried by Rochester-Upon-Medway City Council, to alleviate the congestion. The High Street itself is traffic free, so all traffic on Best Street and Railway Street has to skirt around it. The basic west–east routes are The Brook to the north and New Road to the south, but the additional problems caused by the situation of the Pentagon Bus Station meant that conflicting traffic flows were the result, from 1975 and onward. From April 1986 and onward until October 1987, the town centre remodelling of Chatham began, and Railway Street was realigned into becoming part of an inner ring road, that became a one-way system. This redevelopment included the demolition of the House of Holland department store in January 1987, and the construction of the Sir John Hawkins Flyover in Chatham, that was opened in February 1989, so the traffic could be carried from south to north over the High Street.

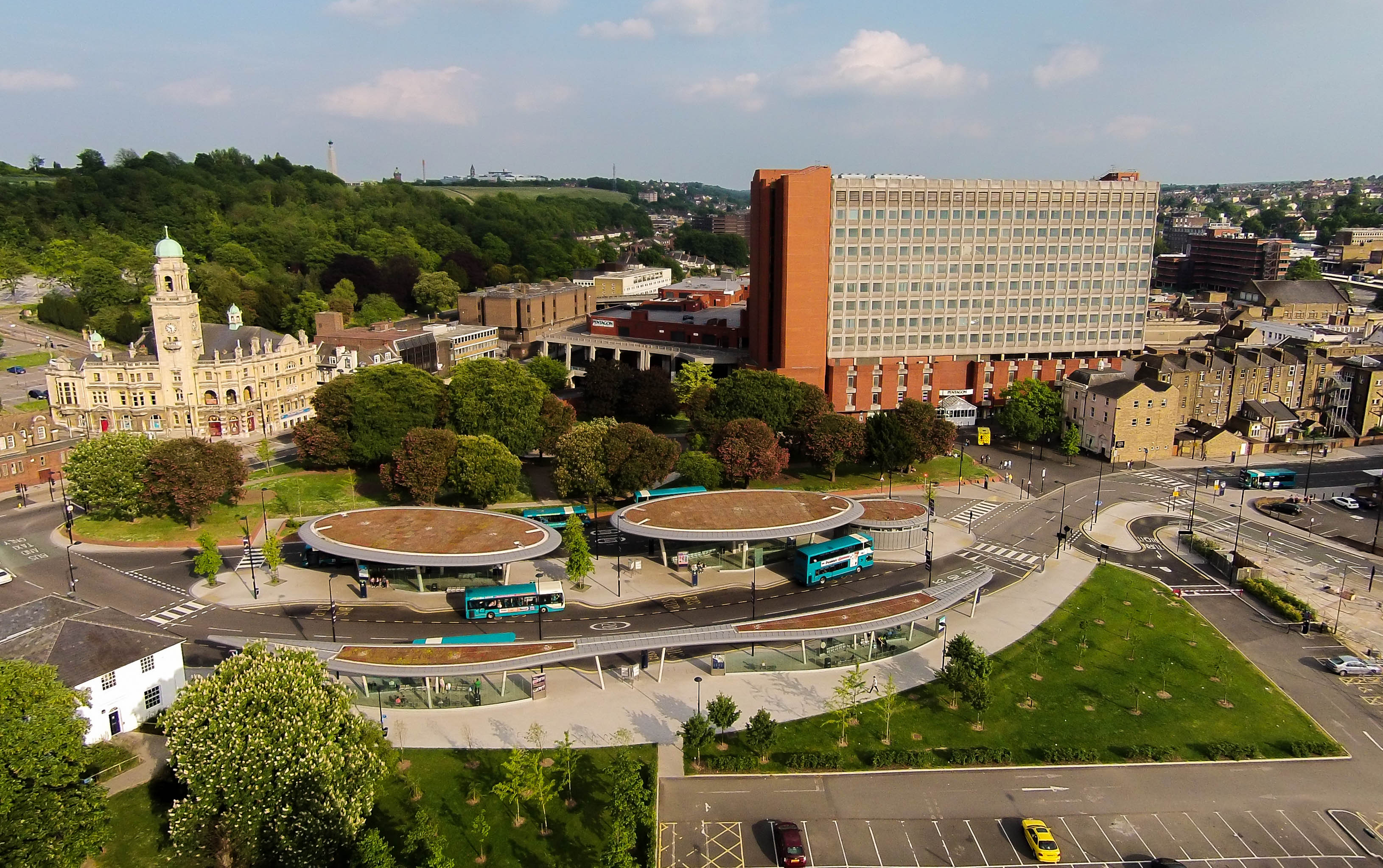
Chatham Waterfront bus station

In September 2006, the one-way system was abandoned and two-way traffic reintroduced on most of the ring-road system. Further work on the road system commenced early in 2009, and as of early 2010, the demolition of the Sir John Hawkins Flyover has been completed. It was replaced by a street-level, buses only, road coupled with repositioning of the bus station. The new Waterfront bus station opened in October 2011.

Chatham railway station, opened in 1858, serves both the North Kent and the Chatham Main Lines, and is the interchange between the two lines. It lies in the valley between the Fort Pitt and the Chatham Tunnels. There are three trains an hour to London Victoria, two trains an hour to London Charing Cross, two trains an hour to Luton (via London Bridge, St Pancras and Luton Airport Parkway) and two services an hour to St Pancras via High Speed 1. The former services run to Dover and Ramsgate; the Charing Cross services terminate at Gillingham and the High Speed services terminate at Faversham.

Part of the industrial railway in what is now Chatham Historic Dockyard is still in operation, run by the North Kent Industrial Locomotive Society for the Dockyard Trustees.

Buses are operated by Arriva Southern Counties and Nu-Venture to various destinations. They serve other towns in Medway including Gillingham, Grain, Strood and Rochester and also to other towns in Kent including Maidstone, Gravesend, Blue Bell Hill and Sittingbourne. There is also an express bus via Strood and Rochester and A2 to Bluewater in Greenhithe.

== Religion ==
In the 19th century the ecclesiastical parish of Chatham included Luton and Brompton and also Chatham Intra (land on the river that was administered by the City of Rochester). Chatham's Parish Church, St Marys, which stood on Dock Road, was rebuilt as the Preaching Box of the Georgian Age in November 1788. St John's was a Waterloo church built in October 1821 by Robert Smirke, and restructured in February 1869 by Gordon Macdonald Hills; it ceased being an active church by December 1964, and is currently used as an art project. St Paul's New Road was built in September 1854; declared redundant in March 1974, it has been demolished. St Peter's Troy Town was built in January 1860. Christchurch Luton was built in May 1843, replaced on 14 July 1884. The Royal Dockyard Church, which was opened in July 1806, was declared redundant by 30 April 1981.

St Michael's is a Roman Catholic church, that was built in June 1863. There is a Unitarian Chapel built in August 1861.

Chatham is reputed to be the home of the first Baptist Chapel in North Kent, the Zion Baptist Chapel in Clover Street. The first known pastor was Edward Morecock who settled there in February 1663. During the time of Oliver Cromwell Edward Morecock had been a sea-captain and had been injured in battle. His knowledge of the River Medway is reputed to have preserved him from persecution in the reign of King Charles II. A second Baptist Chapel was founded about November 1702. The Ebenezer Chapel dates from March 1662.

Chatham Memorial Synagogue was opened on 17 June 1870 at the Chatham end of Rochester High Street in Rochester.

== Education ==
For a full list of schools serving Chatham visit List of schools in Medway.

== Sports ==
The town's Association Football club, Chatham Town F.C., plays in the Premier Division of the Isthmian League having gained two successive promotions in the 21/22 and 22/23 seasons. Lordswood F.C. plays in the Southern Counties East Football League. The defunct Chatham Excelsior F.C. were one of the early pioneers of football in Southern England. Football league side Gillingham F.C. are seen to represent Medway as a whole. Holcombe Hockey Club is one of the largest in the country, and are based in Chatham. The men's 1st XI are part of the England Hockey League.

Kite Flying is possible, especially power kiting on the Great Lines Heritage Park (between Gillingham and Chatham) and at Capstone Farm Country Park.

Skiing is also possible near Capstone Farm Country Park at Capstone Ski Slope and Snowboard Centre.

== Popular culture ==
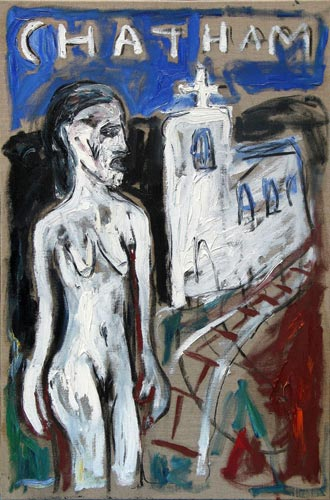
St John's Church, Chatham (2000) by local artist Billy Childish

On a cultural level, Chatham gave birth to several creative movements in literature, art and music. In the period from October 1977 until March 1982 the Medway Delta Sound emerged. The term was coined as a joke by the Chatham-born writer, painter and musician Billy Childish after the Medway Towns-based record label of Russell Wilkins, Empire Records, used the phrase "From The Medway Delta". Several bands of the Medway Delta Sound gained international recognition, including The Milkshakes, The Prisoners (see also James Taylor Quartet) and The Dentists.

Out of the Kent Institute of Art & Design (KIAD), now the University for the Creative Arts (UCA) came the band known as Wang Chung. The vocalist and guitarist with Wang Chung, Jeremy Allan Ryder, who is better known as Jack Hues attended KIAD, as he musically helped to evolve Wang Chung with Nick Feldman. Alongside such individuals was Alan John Denman, who became a well established lecturer at KIAD, and who founded The Flying Circuits in April 1984, which became an urban theatre movement in Chatham and Gillingham in the Medway Towns, and within suburbs like Woolwich, Plumstead, Bexley and Orpington in Greater London. Many students from KIAD played various acting roles within The Flying Circuits, in the Medway Towns and Greater London. The scenes performed by The Flying Circuits were entirely based upon excerpts from the Electronic Town, a screenplay written by Alan Denman from January 1984 to October 1984, which concerned a futuristic science fiction dystopia. Alan Denman also helped to form The Medway Poets with Billy Childish, Robert Earl, Bill Lewis, Sexton Ming and Charles Thomson. The Medway Poets met regularly at the York Tavern & Railway Inn, in Ordnance Street, Chatham, from October 1974 to August 1985, near KIAD at Fort Pitt in Rochester, and Chatham railway station. Chatham has always had a strong musical and creative arts heritage that has remained centred on local groups, many of whom were also part of the KIAD. Charles Thomson and Billy Childish went on to create the artistic movement known as Stuckism in January 1999.

There was a resurgence in the live music scene in February 2001, with an initial focus on the Tap 'N' Tin venue at 24 Railway Street in Chatham. The essence of the original greatness of the Medway Delta Sound was revived by music and poetry evenings promoted by the Urban Fox Press of David Wise, which also published several books by poets and artists in the Medway Towns. In September 2008. the independent arts organisation Medway Eyes was founded, specialising in music and photography. It had promoted several arts exhibitions and gigs at The Barge, at 63 Layfield Road, in Gillingham (now closed) and the Nag's Head at 292 Rochester High Street, but disbanded in April 2013.

The Medway Poets were formed in August 1975 and disbanded in March 1982 having performed at the Kent Literature Festival and many others in South East England and on TV and Radio. They became a significant influence to writers in Chatham and elsewhere in the Medway Towns. From the core of this group the anti conceptual/pro painting movement of Remodernism came into being.

Recent Medway artists of note include Kid Harpoon, Crybaby Special and The Monsters, Red Light, Underground Heroes, Tyrannosaurus Alan, Pete Molinari, Lupen Crook, Brigadier Ambrose, Stuart Turner and Theatre Royal.

The term chav is sometimes falsely said to be a local one, meaning "Chatham Average", but the word derives from the Romany word for youngster. Before the Chatham Dockyard was closed down on 31 March 1984, the cultural idea of the chav did not exist in the Medway Towns.

The Imperial Picture Palace opened on Chatham High Street on 28 January 1914. It was taken over by Associated British Cinemas in October 1929, and then closed it in January 1937. After this happened the Imperial Picture Palace was demolished and rebuilt on the same site in February 1937. A much larger Regent Cinema then opened in July 1938. This second cinema was rebranded as the ABC in October 1961, but then closed in January 1972. It opened again in June 1972 as a three screen premises. The ABC was taken over by the Cannon Group and rebranded as the Cannon in October 1986, but was renamed the ABC again by November 1987 during a buyout. The cinema closed on 3 January 2002 and was demolished in December 2003 after having been damaged by two fires. The site is now occupied by flats.

== Local media ==
=== Newspapers ===
Local newspapers for Chatham include Medway News and Medway Standard, both published by Kent Regional News and Media; and the Medway Messenger, published by the KM Group, whose registered address is in New Barnet, in Hertfordshire. The town also has free newspapers such as the Medway Extra (KM Group) and Your Medway (KOS Media).

=== Radio ===
The local commercial radio station for Chatham is KMFM Medway, owned by the KM Group. The Medway Towns are also served by a community radio station Radio Sunlight based in the Sunlight Centre in Gillingham. The area can also receive the countywide stations BBC Radio Kent, Heart South and Gold, as well as many radio stations in Essex and Greater London. BBC Radio Kent moved to Sun Pier in Chatham in 1986, then to The Great Hall at Mount Pleasant Road in Royal Tunbridge Wells in 2001.

=== Television ===
Local news and television programmes are provided by BBC South East and ITV Meridian from the Bluebell Hill TV transmitter, supplemented by a low power relay transmitter in Chatham Town Centre that has the National Grid Reference (NGR) of TQ767675.

== Notable people ==
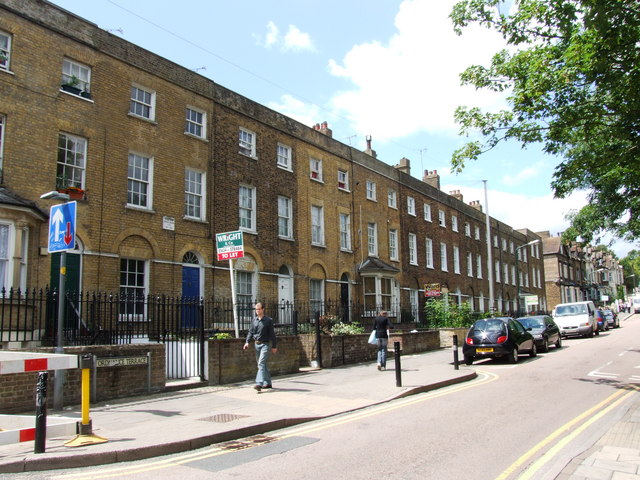
Ordnance Terrace in June 2009

Charles Dickens lived in the town as a boy, both in The Brook and in Ordnance Terrace before Chatham railway station was built just opposite. He subsequently described it as the happiest period of his childhood, and eventually returned to the area in adulthood when he bought a house in nearby Gad's Hill. Medway features in his novels. He then moved to Rochester, a nearby town, also part of the Medway Towns.

Others who were born or who lived or live in Chatham:

- Sir Jacob Ackworth, shipbuilder.
- George Edward Bond, architect and surveyor.
- Asquith Xavier, ended a colour bar at British Railways in London by fighting to become the first non-white train guard at Euston railway station.
- Percy Whitlock, organist and post-romantic composer
- Richard Dadd, Victorian era painter and patricide
- William Coles Finch, author and historian, lived at Luton, Chatham.
- Elizabeth Benger, biographer, novelist and poet, was brought up here between 1782 and 1797.
- Billy Childish, artist, poet, and musician.
- Tracey Emin, artist and member of the Young British Artists.
- Zandra Rhodes, designer.
- Bill Lewis, poet, painter, storyteller and mythographer
- William Ridsdel, The Salvation Army Commissioner, lived in the town from 1877 to 1878.
- William Cuffay, Chartist leader and tailor, born in Chatham in 1788
- Gemma Lavender, astronomer, journalist and author, born in Chatham in 1986.
- Thomas Hodgskin, an early socialist, was born and raised in Chatham. His work would go on to influence Karl Marx.
- William Broughton, a pioneer settler in New South Wales
- Joe Machine, artist and poet.
- Milo Yiannopoulos, far-right political commentator, author, speaker.

=== Entertainers ===
- Tommy Knight, actor.
- Stel Pavlou, author and screenwriter, attended the Chatham Grammar School for Boys.
- Lee Ryan, boy-band singer, also attended the Chatham Grammar School for Boys.
- Ben Mills, singer and X-Factor contestant.
- Anne Dudley, composer, pop musician and member of The Art of Noise.
- Kevin Eldon, stand-up comedian.
- Glenn Shorrock, entertainer, birthplace (Little River Band founder, lead singer).
- River Medway (drag queen), entertainer (RuPaul's Drag Race UK).
- Balvinder Sopal, actress (EastEnders).
- Kid Harpoon, singer, songwriter, musician and record producer. Born and lived in Chatham.

=== Sportsmen ===
- Dave Whitcombe, twice BDO World Darts Championship Finalist.
- Kevin Hunt, former captain of the Bohemians, a League of Ireland club.
- Ashley Jackson, England international hockey player.
- Keith Donohue, Devon cricketer.
- Chris Smalling, England international footballer, attended Chatham Grammar School for Boys.
- Andrew Crofts, professional footballer, who played for Newport County.
- Neil Shipperley, professional footballer, formerly of Crystal Palace FC and Wimbledon FC.
- George Boyd, professional footballer, who played for Peterborough United and was born in Chatham.
- Lee Minshull, professional footballer, AFC Wimbledon and was born in Chatham.
- Johnny Armour, professional boxer, British Commonwealth, European and World Boxing Union bantamweight champion was born and resides in Chatham.
- George Thorne, professional footballer, was born in Chatham.
- Ryan Richards, professional basketball player, drafted by the San Antonio Spurs in the 2010 NBA draft.

== Twin towns ==
Chatham is twinned with Valenciennes, France.

== See also ==
- Chatham, Massachusetts, a city often twinned with Chatham.

== Bibliography ==
- Hughes, David (2004), Chatham Naval Dockyard and Barracks, The History Press ISBN 0-7524-3248-6
