= Stuart Turner (musician) =

- Born: Stuart Turner; Bournemouth, Dorset, England
- Genres: Blues, folk, alternative
- Instruments: Vocals, guitar
- Labels: Sun Pier Records, Brigadier Records, Vacilando '68

Stuart Turner (born Bournemouth, Dorset, England) is an English alternative blues singer. He now lives in Medway, Kent. Having released two solo albums, Turner formed the band Stuart Turner & The Flat Earth Society in 2009 and went on to release several albums before a hiatus in 2020.

== Early career ==
Though being an active musician for a number of years, and playing with a number of different local musicians, Turner's first official solo release came on Sun Pier Records, a Chatham based record label distributed by Cargo, and formed by friend and fellow musician Kris Dollimore, ex-guitarist with The Damned. Turner produced Dollimore's debut Sun Pier release (02/01/1978) in 2006, writing a song on it ("The North Kent Post Industrial Hillstomp Blues") which received national airplay on BBC Radio 2. Turner's own solo appeared a few months later with his debut album, A Gallon of Water Makes a Mile of Fog, which one critic described as "packed full of ideas". Turner supported Dollimore in gigs around England and spent 2006 and 2007 playing shows in a diverse selection of venues, including bowling alleys, cabaret clubs and Swedish festivals, which one reviewer described as "scaring the living daylights out of the assembled crowd with his spooky folk blues". Turner's second album, File Under Carnal Knowledge, was described a freight train riding back bar room down at heel blues", and released on Sun Pier in February 2009.

== Stuart Turner & The Flat Earth Society ==
Turner formed Stuart Turner & The Flat Earth Society (also known as STFES) with guitarist Robbie Wilkinson in 2009 to record what became the band's first album Gin & Bitters. Alongside Turner and Wilkinson in the original line-up were Ray Hunt on drums and Dave Sawicki on bass (with occasional trumpet from John Whitaker). The album was released on CD and digital download in July 2010, through the independent Brigadier Records. The band added "steam driven power" to his "anguished urban blues", and provided the opportunity for live performances around the South East of England, including the Lounge On The Farm festival. STFES performed gigs to the end of 2010, including a Christmas ball at Oxford University. A live version of "Murder On Gaslight Street" was made available for free download via Medway Eyes in October 2010, whilst Brigadier Records released the Gin & Bitters album tracks, "Shimmy" and "South Sea Blues" as radio promos in December that year. Gin & Bitters was followed up with the limited vinyl EP release Weekend Hearts in 2011 before the band recorded On The Brink Of Misadventure, which was their final album release with Brigadier Records.

At this point, the band underwent some line-up changes, with a new line-up containing Turner, Wilkinson, Nick Rice (bass), Bob Collins (guitarist formerly with The Dentists), Rob Shepherd (from The Singing Loins on banjo, mandolin and accordion) and James Kerr recording a new album during 2013. At this point, the band began their association with Vacilando '68 Recordings in Autumn of 2013 and acquired publishing through Bucks Music Publishing. The new album, The Art and Science of Phrenology: a presentation by Stuart Turner and The Flat Earth Society was released by Vacilando '68 in February 2014.

Steve Moore replaced James Kerr as drummer in time for a new EP, The Gentleman's Club, released by Vacilando '68 in October 2014. Whilst recording what would become the band's 4th album, the band gigged extensively around the South East and London and started to make in-roads into the grass roots festival circuit, with an appearance at 2015's Bearded Theory festival a particular highlight. The 4th album, eponymously named, was released to critical acclaim by Vacilando '68 in April 2016 following a long period of artwork and pressing delays. The band had a two-page feature in Maverick Magazine.

With Mike Sewell replacing Steve Moore on drums, the band recorded their 5th album, to be released as Scowl in 2017. The album also features guest appearances from singer-songwriter Rachel Lowrie and David Read (of The Claim). Some left-over songs from the album were released as a digital only release in February 2017. Following the launch of the Scowl album in late 2017, STFES continued to play live as much as possible, making further inroads into the grass roots festival scene, and with Lowrie regularly appearing on vocals. Ani Graves would also perform with the band when Lowrie was unavailable.

New material was written to expand the roles of both Lowrie and Graves, with a collection of songs assembled that suggested a story linking each. The expanded STFES line-up of Turner, Collins, Rice, Sewell, Lowrie and Graves returned to Ranscombe Studios in October 2018. The bulk of the album Implicit Narrative was recorded in 48 hours, with just two songs left to complete. Unfortunately drummer Sewell was plagued by health problems until spring 2019, when the album was finished off in a frantic further 48 hours of recording, mixing and mastering. The speed of the ‘nearly live’ recording was an intentional effort to capture the burgeoning energy of the live shows of the time - almost no overdubs were employed, and the mistakes were left in.

The Medway poets Sarah Jenkin and Barry Fentiman-Hall were approached to deliver sleeve notes on the projected narrative from alternative perspectives and Folkestone-based comic book artist Esther Mace provided images to further illustrate the implicit narrative. The album was set for release in March 2020. However, the launch event occurred just two days before the nationwide lockdown in the wake of the COVID-19 pandemic, Rice was in quarantine and the band's planned mixed media performance was limited to four acoustic songs. Attendance to the gig was hugely impacted by the prevailing medical advice and the album sank on launch. The failure of either the band or Vacilando 68 to get the album onto streaming sites while there was a homebound audience further compounded the failure of the album. With live gigs curtailed and no means of promotion, the album failed to garner a single review, no airplay and minimal sales.

This compounded the diminishing returns of the previous Scowl release, which Turner had felt best encapsulated what he was trying to achieve with STFES and continued misunderstandings regarding the ironic band name continued. STFES as a musical project went on indefinite hiatus from mid-2020.

== Songs From Abdication House / Turner & Bance ==
In late 2015 and early 2016, across multiple sporadic recording sessions, Stuart recorded an album of his own arrangements of left-leaning traditional English, Irish and Scottish folk songs, which was eventually titled Songs From Abdication House. The title referenced the geographical curiosity that James II abdicated in a house on Rochester High Street only 400 yards from the more celebrated Restoration House, where his older brother Charles II ascended to the throne. The album utilised the services of a host of musician friends of Stuart. These including members of Stuart Turner and The Flat Earth Society, Theatre Royal, Larkspur, Justin and The Argonauts and Rastko, as well as Mary Collins (wife of stfes and former Dentist guitarist Bob Collins), and childhood friend and Croydon based multi-instrumentalist Mike Brown, who featured on every song. The release was delayed by artwork delays, further compounded by the UK EU referendum of 2016 and Turner's concerns that the album would be seen as a nationalistic exercise. The album was never formally launched, with the CD-only curiosity becoming casually available from sporadic acoustic gigs and direct from Vacilando ’68 Recordings from late 2017.

As a means to overcome the perennial problem of stage fright in solo performances, Stuart approached double bassist Zoe Bance about the formation of an acoustic duo ‘Turner and Bance’ in late 2018, primarily as a means to perform the Abdication House songs live. This resulted in a spate of gigs in and around the Medway Towns, as well as one road trip to Aylesbury. Unfortunately, whilst songs were being written for a prospective Turner and Bance album, health problems affected Bance's playing and the duo went on hiatus in late 2019.

== Current Activity ==
In October 2017, Turner volunteered his services as lead guitarist to the alt country/indie crossover combo These Guilty Men, following the departure of former Cherub guitarist Matthew Orchard. This new line-up of These Guilty Men had been working on the recording of their self-recorded and produced album The Quiet One from November 2017 onward, and the album is slated for release on the Spinout Nuggets label later in 2020, although delays resulting from the COVID-19 pandemic may result in this date being moved to 2021.

Turner is currently collaborating with Chris Broderick, formerly of Medway folk band The Singing Loins, writing a musical about Catherine Eddowes, as well as songs for a prospective album project with the working title Pod.

== Discography ==
=== Albums ===
Solo

- A Gallon of Water Makes a Mile of Fog (October 2007, Sun Pier)
- File Under Carnal Knowledge (February 2009, Sun Pier)

With STFES

- Gin & Bitters (July 2010, Brigadier)
- On The Brink Of Misadventure (2012, Brigadier)
- The Art and Science of Phrenology: a presentation by Stuart Turner and The Flat Earth Society (February 2014, Vacilando '68)
- Stuart Turner and The Flat Earth Society (2016, Vacilando '68)
- Scowl (2017, Vacilando '68)
- Implicit Narrative (2020, Vacilando '68)

=== Singles ===
(all with STFES)

- "Weekend Hearts EP" (2011, Brigadier)
- "The Gentleman's Club EP" (2014, Vacilando '68)
- "Offcuts EP" (2017, Vacilando '68)
