= Chatham Waterfront bus station =

Bus station in Chatham, Kent, England

Coordinates: 51.3850°N 0.5242°E

Chatham Waterfront
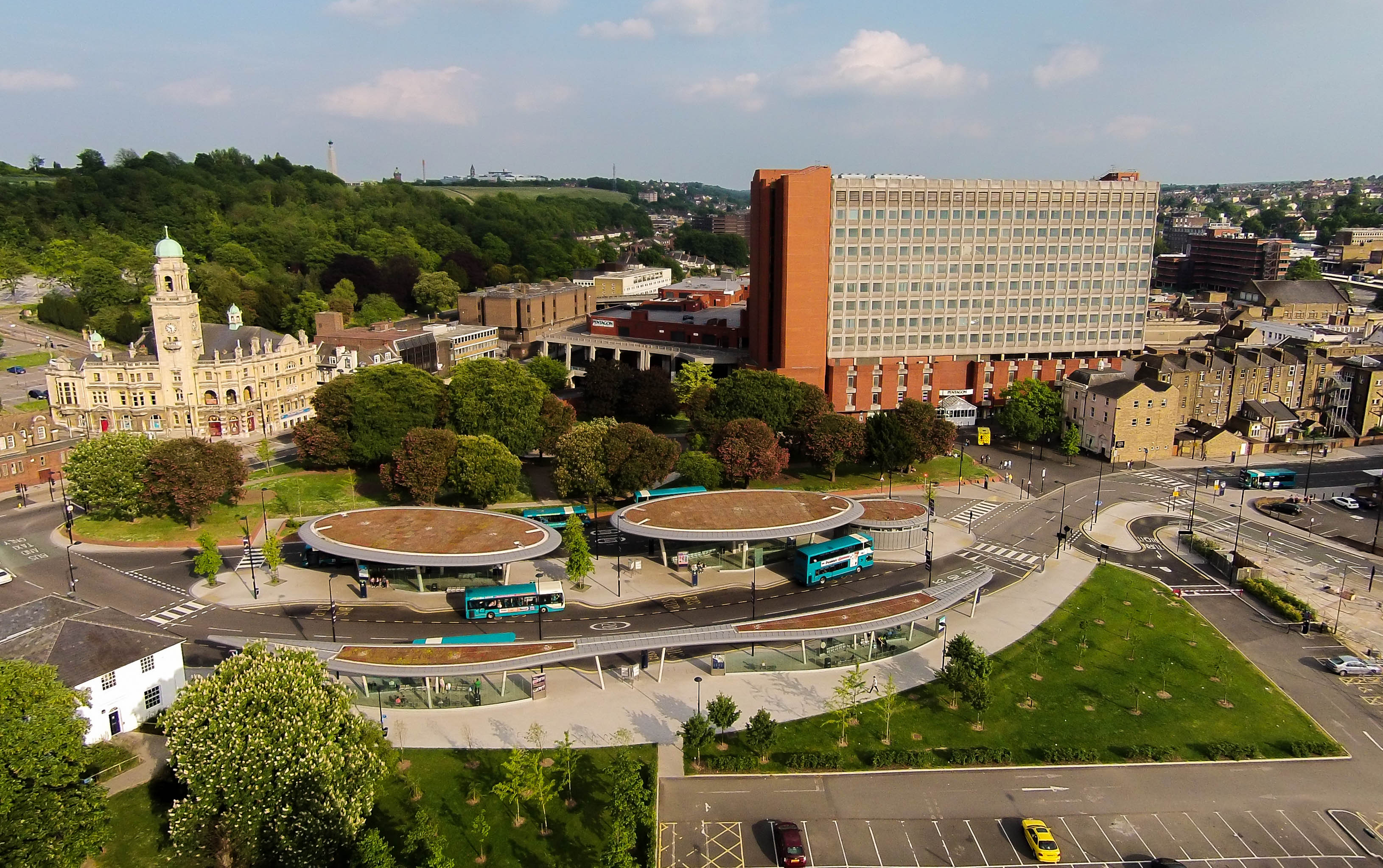
- The bus station in 2014

General information
- Location: Globe Lane and Waterfront Way, Chatham, Kent; Medway
- Operator: Medway Council
- Bus stands: 19
- Bus operators: Arriva Southern Counties; Nu-Venture; ASD Coaches; Chalkwell Coaches; Stagecoach Express
- Connections: Chatham railway station

Construction
- Architect: D5 Architects

History
- Opened: 10 October 2011; 14 years ago
Location

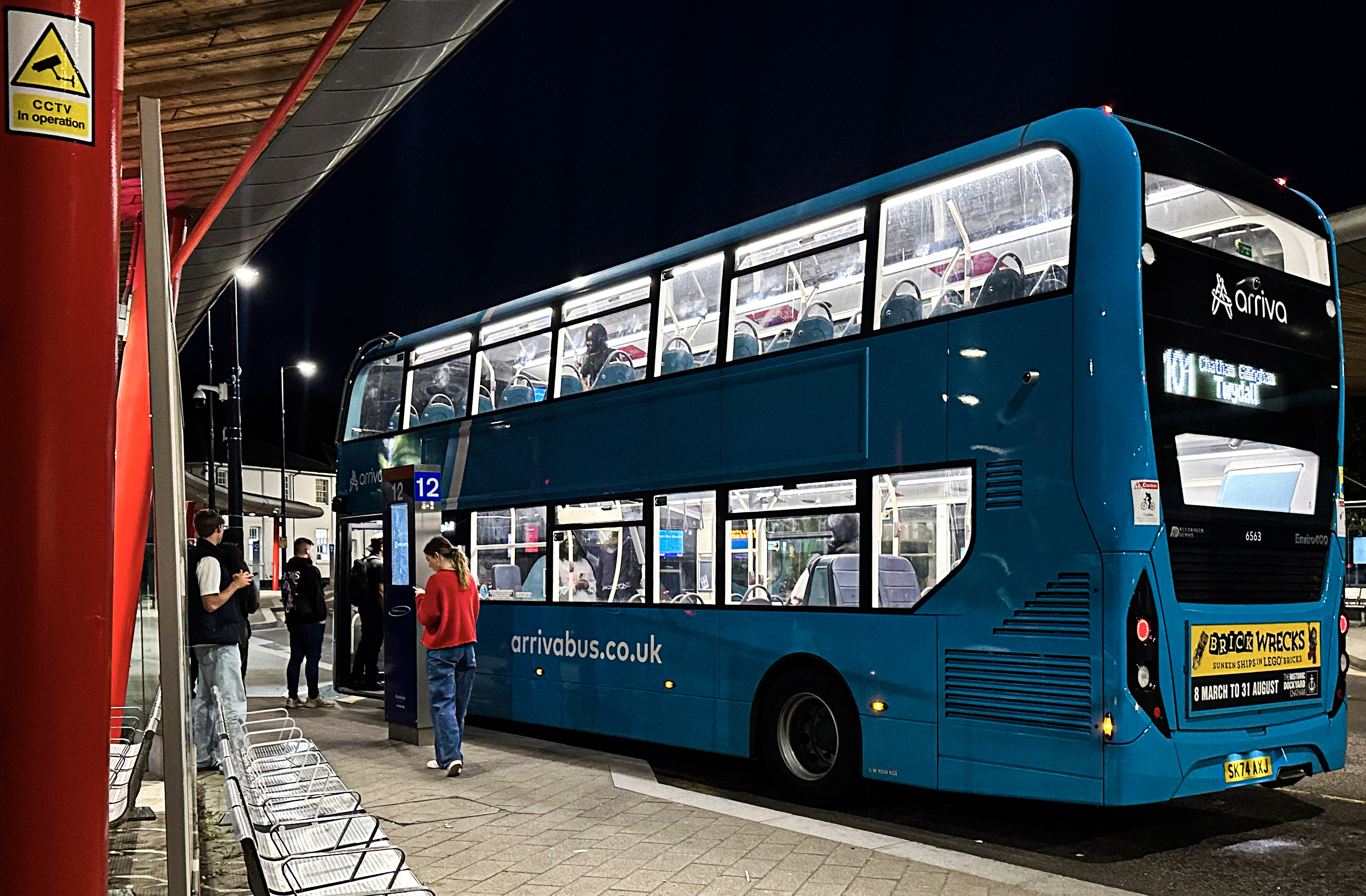
101 to Twydall on Platform B at Chatham Waterfront Bus Station

Chatham Waterfront Bus Station is the main bus terminus located within Chatham Waterfront serving the town of Chatham, in the Medway area of South East England. Opened in October 2011, the bus station replaced the former Pentagon Bus Station, which had operated since the 1970s.

== History ==
The new facility was constructed as part of Medway Council’s long-term regeneration strategy for Chatham town centre, led by the Medway Renaissance partnership and forming part of a wider £6 billion, 20-year development programme across the Medway Towns. A central component of this vision was the demolition of the Sir John Hawkins flyover, a major elevated road structure that had dominated Chatham High Street for over 30 years. The flyover had long been criticised for cutting off the town centre from its riverside and casting a shadow over key pedestrian areas. Despite considerable public opposition, including a petition signed by nearly all of Chatham’s 131 central businesses, the council proceeded with its removal, citing the need for better connectivity, urban renewal, and investment in public transport infrastructure. In late 2008, the flyover was closed to all traffic, with buses, taxis, and cycles rerouted through a temporary route via a neighbouring car park. The £1.6 million demolition project began shortly thereafter, with the rubble repurposed to form a new ground-level road across the High Street, connecting Railway Street to Globe Lane. This new road corridor provided access to the site earmarked for the town’s new bus station at The Paddock, which later became Chatham Waterfront bus station. The removal of the flyover not only created physical space for regeneration but was also symbolic of Chatham’s efforts to reconnect the town centre with the River Medway and modernise its public transport facilities.

== Layout ==
In 2011, Chatham’s main bus terminus was relocated from the Pentagon Shopping Centre to a new purpose-built facility at The Paddock, situated between the town centre and the River Medway.

The Chatham Waterfront Bus Station, designed by D5 Architects, was secured through a competitive interview process. The station features distinctive curved canopies with metal fascias, creating a visually striking and modern design. The layout incorporates 20 bus stands arranged around a central concourse, with a passenger information centre (now disused) and integrated landscaping that preserves surrounding mature trees. This design emphasizes transparency and a connection to the natural environment, with platforms nestled under tree-like canopies, enhancing the overall user experience.

The station is served by operators including Arriva Southern Counties and Nu-Venture under contracts with Medway Council.

== Incidents and controversy ==
Despite its modern, open-air design, the bus station has faced ongoing criticism from passengers and local residents due to concerns over safety and visibility. Its open design and layout create several blind spots, making it difficult for passengers to see approaching buses or navigate the platforms easily. The absence of enclosed or staffed facilities, especially following the closure of the travel centre in 2020, has further contributed to criticism regarding the station’s overall functionality and user experience.

May 2014: A bus driver collapsed at the wheel, causing the bus to veer into a traffic island near Railway Street.

April 2014: A bus crashed into a grass verge at The Paddock, resulting in two passengers being taken to Medway Maritime Hospital.

July 3, 2015: Mark Toulson, 27, was charged with assault after allegedly attacking a woman at Chatham Bus Station. The woman was taken to Medway Maritime Hospital for treatment, and Toulson was arrested on suspicion of assault and breaching a non-molestation order.

March 8, 2016: A woman was hit by a bus at the bus station near the Pentagon. Emergency services, including an air ambulance, attended the scene, and the woman was taken to Medway Maritime Hospital with minor injuries.

June 2017: Toilets at the bus station were closed after repeated vandalism, including excrement being spread on walls, used syringes left behind, and staff being threatened. The toilets, originally for staff use, were misused by the public, leading to the decision to close them permanently. Medway Council reported the incidents to the police.

August 18, 2023: A man was arrested after allegedly exposing himself and committing an indecent act. Police reviewed CCTV footage and arrested a 52-year-old man on suspicion of indecent exposure. He was later bailed pending further inquiries.

July 27, 2024: A woman was taken to hospital after being hit by a bus.

December 9, 2024: An air ambulance was called to Waterfront Way in Chatham after a man was hit by a minibus.
