= Chatham Town Hall =

Municipal building in Chatham, Kent, England

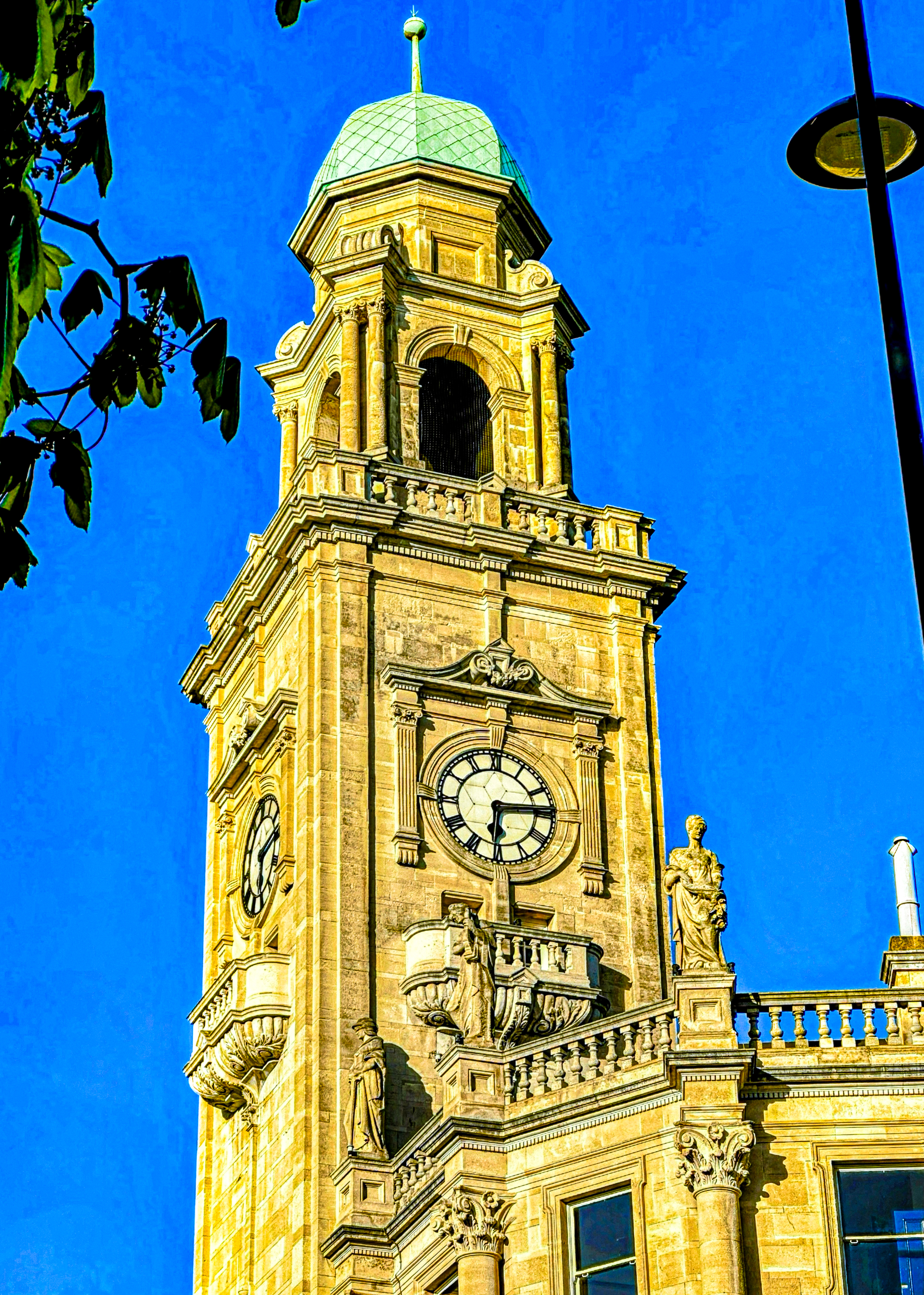
- The Brook Theatre, showing the clock tower of the former Chatham Town Hall

- Location within Kent
- Former names: Medway Arts Centre

General information
- Type: Town hall
- Architectural style: Renaissance style
- Location: Chatham, Kent
- Coordinates: 51.3851°N 0.5258°E
- Construction started: 1900
- Completed: 1900
- Closed: 2 April 2023
- Client: Chatham Borough Council
- Owner: Medway Council

Technical details
- Material: Bath stone with ragstone plinth and slate roof

Design and construction
- Architect: George Edward Bond

Renovating team
- Architect: Thomas Sinden

Website
- https://www.medwayticketslive.co.uk/info/brook-theatre

Listed Building – Grade II
- Official name: Former Town Hall and Medway Arts Centre
- Designated: 1 June 1990
- Reference no.: 1268228

Chatham Town Hall, sometimes referred to as Chatham's Old Town Hall, is a historic municipal building located on The Brook in Chatham, Kent, England. Designed by George Edward Bond and opened in 1900, it served as the administrative headquarters of Chatham Borough Council.

Since the late 1980s, the building has been owned and operated by Medway Council as a theatre and arts centre, and it has functioned as the Brook Theatre since 1997. Now a grade II listed building, it is currently undergoing a major refurbishment led by the council.

== History ==
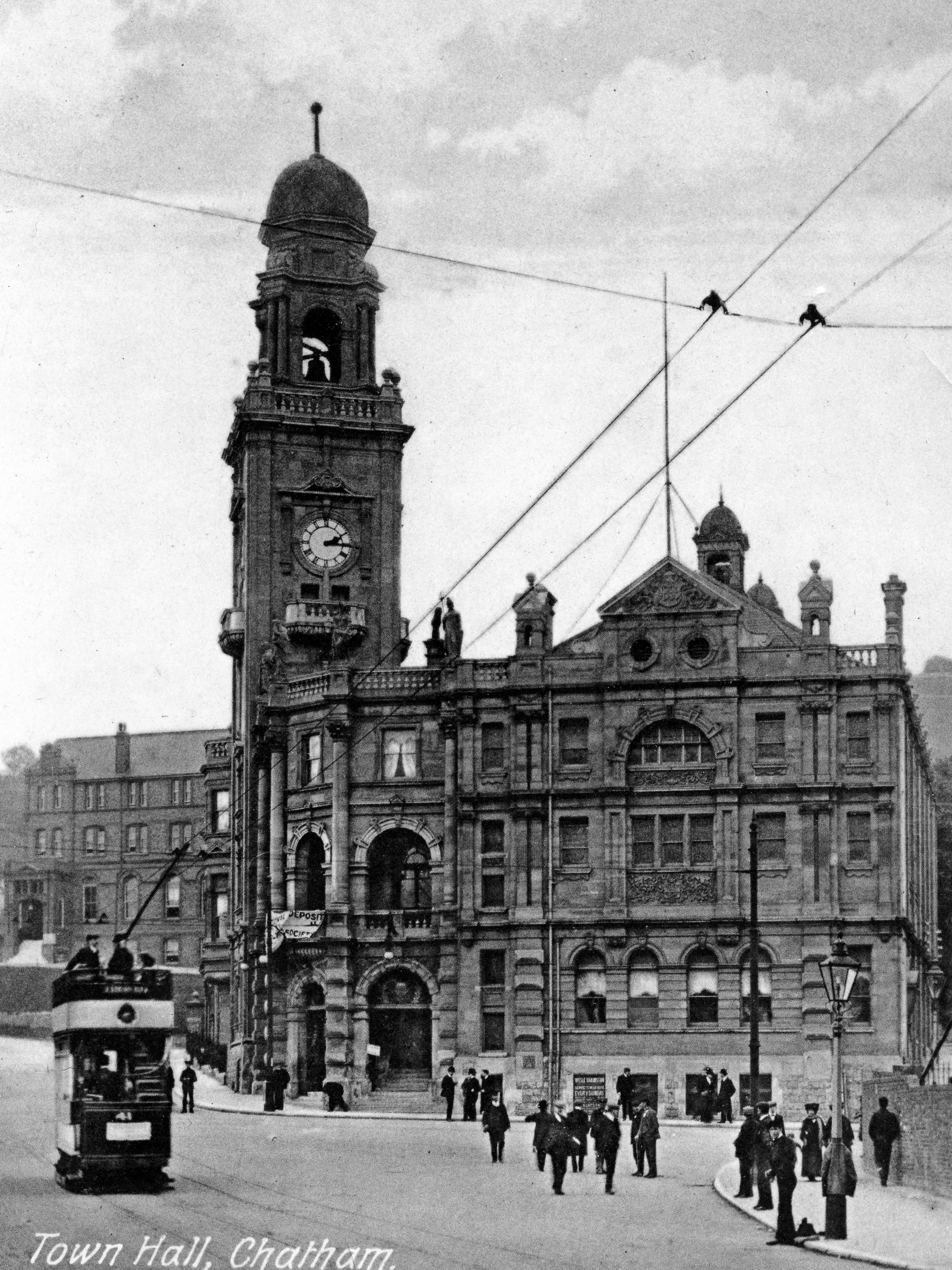
Chatham Town Hall (c.1920)

Following the incorporation of Chatham as a municipal borough on 22 November 1890, civic leaders decided to procure a dedicated town hall: the site they selected was a plot of vacant land, which was owned by the War Office, located just to the south east of what was then a military storehouse.

The site was acquired and construction of the new building started in 1898. It was designed by George Edward Bond in the Renaissance style and opened on 23 January 1900 by Lord Rosebery. The design involved an asymmetrical main frontage with five bays facing onto The Brook; the central section of three bays, which slightly projected forward, featured four round headed widows on the ground floor, the borough coat of arms with three sash windows above on the first floor, a large round headed window on the second floor and a pediment containing a carving with the year "1899" above. At roof level the architect erected figures depicting justice, Britannia, agriculture and music. The section of three bays on the left, on the corner with Barrier Road, featured round headed doorways on the ground floor, a loggia with round headed openings on the first floor, sash windows on the second floor, flanked by Corinthian order columns which spanned the second and third floors, and a parapet above. Beyond that, there was a three-stage clock tower with a domed cupola; it originally housed an hour-striking clock by Potts & Sons (though this was replaced by an electric mechanism on 23 August 1935).

The principal rooms, which were on the first floor, were the mayor's parlour (on the left of the building), the council chamber (on the left of the building at the rear) and a large assembly hall with a proscenium arch (on the right of the building). On 21 October 1938, in anticipation of the Second World War, the headquarters of the Air Raid Precautions (ARP), later the Civil Defence Service (CDS), was established in the basement of the building. The town hall was the venue for various scenes in the satirical comedy film, Left Right and Centre, starring Ian Carmichael, in 1959. In 1965, the building was used in the opening sequence of nuclear war docudrama The War Game.

The building ceased to be the local seat of government in 1974.

=== The Brook Theatre ===
In May 1987, under the promotional motto "Putting The Arts Back Into The Medway," the building was repurposed as the Medway Arts Centre, hosting a variety of performances, including a concert by My Bloody Valentine in January 1988. A decade later, in April 1997, it was relaunched as the Brook Theatre, with a focus on children's theatre productions.

By the early 2000s, the Brook Theatre had evolved into a mixed-use arts venue, featuring a 400-seat main auditorium, a 60-seat studio, and spaces for workshops and community events. The Summer 2005 season included performances by StopGAP and Earthfall, music from Ko, the James Taylor Quartet, and the Mrs. Ackroyd Band, as well as theatre, comedy, and world music. The Autumn 2005 programme followed with further comedy, jazz by The Barcodes, folk acts, youth theatre, productions of Scrooge and Pinocchio, and a Black History Month presentation, SANKOFA, alongside regular classes in drama, dance, and youth performance.

In 2006-07 the Brook Theatre was operating as an active community arts venue. A Medway Council theatre report described annual Christmas productions for children and families, comedy-club activity, and studio hires for amateur and smaller professional companies, and said the theatre was intended to function as an arts-based resource for the community. The same report noted deterioration in the building fabric: curtains had been damaged by water incursion from a roof parapet repaired in 2005, replacement was estimated at £10,000, and secondary income from confectionery and ice cream sales across the Brook and Central theatres generated a profit of £32,535 in 2006–07.

The theatre completed minor external repairs and alterations in 2016 under Medway Council listed building consent MC/16/1319, which authorized phased stonework, iron cramp, mortar, lead, and cast iron works following a visual survey by Carden & Godfrey Architects.

The theatre became part of a wider regeneration programme in 2021. Medway Council's June 2021 briefing note said the Brook would benefit from the £9.5 million Future High Streets Fund award through investment in new studio space and 3,358 sq ft of flexible workspace, while later council papers recorded a £300,000 Brook allocation from the Future High Streets Fund and a further £6.5 million from the Levelling Up Fund to improve the building's facilities, digitise the offer and support a more flexible creative-workspace model. Taken together, those documents show the project moving from studio-space improvements toward a broader refurbishment programme. The Brook closed to the public on 2 April 2023 for major improvements, and Medway Council said the closure was needed to complete refurbishment works and any associated structural improvements. A later council report explained that intrusive surveys, funded in November 2022, revealed structural issues that were separate from the original grant-funded works, leading the council to add £14.7 million to its capital programme on 20 July 2023 for the necessary structural repairs and wider accessibility and digital improvements.

In November 2024, the Medway Council Cabinet agreed to award the main refurbishment contract for the theatre to Thomas Sinden Ltd for £10,801,760.01, subject to the Levelling Up funding period being extended. This decision followed intrusive surveys, funded in November 2022, which revealed structural issues separate from the original grant-funded works, leading the council to add £14.7 million to its capital programme on 20 July 2023 for necessary repairs and wider accessibility and digital improvements. According to a 2025 council update, the contractor is set to mobilise in March 2025, with completion expected by Spring 2027.
