= Radio Sunlight =

Community radio station in Kent, England

Coordinates: 51°23′36″N 0°33′1″E

England
- Broadcast area: Medway
- Frequency: 106.6 FM

Programming
- Format: Community radio

History
- First air date: 27 March 2012
- Last air date: 19 February 2016

Radio Sunlight is a community radio station serving the Medway towns in Kent, England.

== History ==
The station originally started broadcasting online in 2006, run by local Medway charity the Sunlight Development Trust. OFCOM awarded the Trust the licence to broadcast on FM in 2009, with transmissions starting 27 March 2012 on 106.6FM.

In 2016, Sunlight Development Trust made the decision to change format from FM broadcast to Internet broadcast. The FM licence was not renewed and Radio Sunlight ceased broadcasting on 19 February 2016 while, at the same time, transitioning to its new format as an Internet-based local community radio station.
