= Pentagon Shopping Centre =

Shopping centre in Chatham, Kent, England

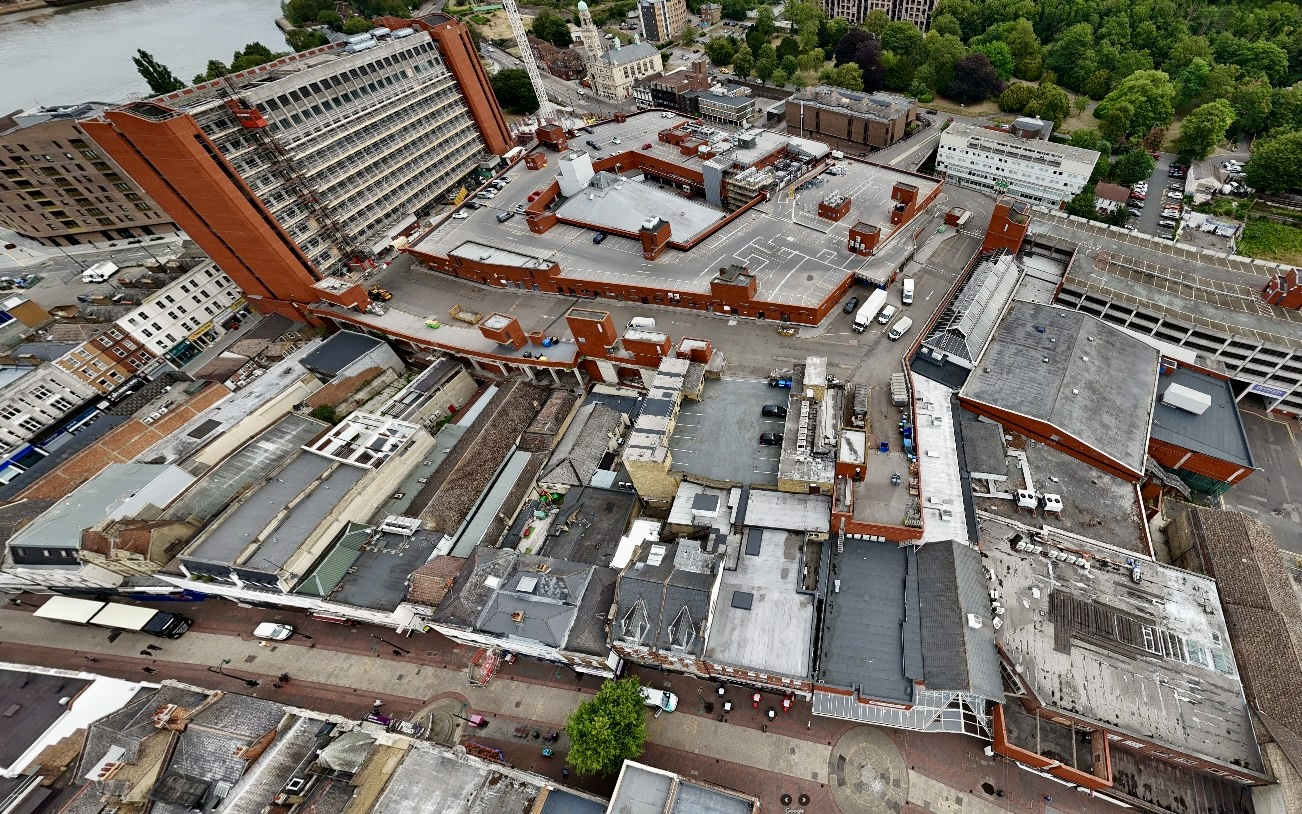
- Aerial view of the Pentagon Shopping Centre complex
- Location: Chatham, Kent, England
- Coordinates: 51°23′1″N 0°31′32″E
- Opened: 1975
- Renovated: 1991
- Owner: Medway Council
- Num. of stores: 77
- Num. of anchor tenants: 3
- Floor area: 329,880 sq ft (30,647 m^{2})
- Floors: 3
- Public transit: Chatham Waterfront Bus Station
- Website: www.pentagonshoppingcentre.co.uk

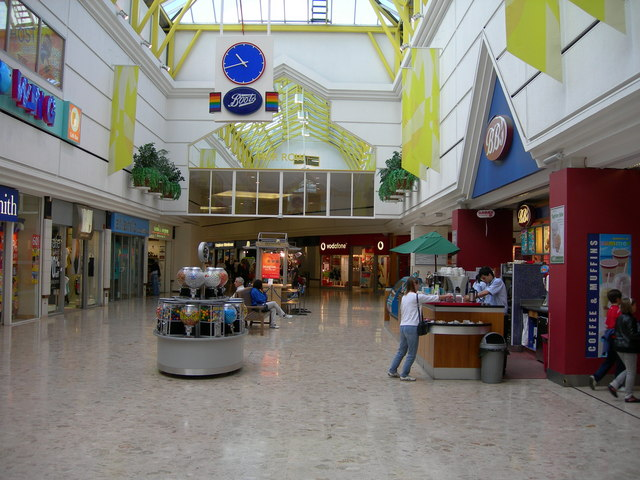
Inside the Pentagon Shopping Centre

The Pentagon Shopping Centre (locally known as "The Pentagon") is a shopping centre located in Chatham, Kent, England. The centre's name is derived from the five-sided shape of its main courtyard, known as "Pentagon Court," a name that has been in use since the shopping centre's construction. Nearby areas within the centre include "Valenciennes Square" and "Fair Row."

The Pentagon was developed by County and District Properties Limited in partnership with Chatham Borough Council. The shopping centre is home to over 70 shops and 7 leisure facilities, featuring a range of high street retailers, homeware stores, food outlets, cafes, restaurants, and a bowling alley. Although the centre does not have a traditional food court, it includes dedicated dining areas, such as the external seating space for Greggs located within the "Pentagon Court" area, which serves as a dining area specifically for that store. Other nearby stores, such as Subway, offer in-store eating areas, and Greggs provides both indoor and outdoor seating.

Built as part of the Chatham town centre redevelopment in the 1970s, the Pentagon includes the high-rise Mountbatten House office block, which has been underused for much of its history. The Pentagon, Mountbatten House, and the Brook multi-storey car park are constructed from orange-red brick and grey concrete, characteristic of the "brutalist architecture" style popular during that period.

The Ground Floor has a Very Different Layout to the first Floor, the Former Pentagon Bus Station was on the first floor, and The Second Floor has the Lower Car Park, the Third floor is the Service area and the Fourth Floor is the Rooftop Car Park

== Stores ==
The long-established WHSmith store, a prominent tenant within the Pentagon Shopping Centre for many years, closed on 15 April 2015 following the expiration of its lease agreement. The closure marked the end of a significant retail presence within the centre. WHSmith was an anchor tenant as was the health and beauty retailer Superdrug in the Pentagon Shopping Centre, when it opened on 30 June 1975.

The unit formerly occupied by WHSmith was later taken over by DEICHMANN, a European footwear retailer that continues to operate there.

The Pentagon Shopping Centre also features a taxi rank located on The Brook.

== Information ==
The Pentagon Shopping Centre is spread over two floors, with the scenic lifts and two escalators located in the Pentagon Court connecting to Valenciennes Square on the First Floor. The fashion retailer New Look also has a two-level unit, accessible from the ground floor. The former WHSmith unit used to occupy two floors, but downsized to ground-floor only during 2004. The health, beauty and pharmacy retailer Boots also downsized its store over the years, with part of its store now used as an NHS surgery.

== History ==
The Pentagon Shopping Centre, locally known simply as "The Pentagon", was constructed from 1973 to 1975 as part of a major redevelopment of Chatham town centre. The name of the Pentagon Shopping Centre is derived from the five-sided shape of its main courtyard, known as "Pentagon Court", a name that has been in use since the opening of the Pentagon Shopping Centre on 30 June 1975. Other nearby internal areas include "Valenciennes Square" and "Fair Row", which reflect the former street layout and heritage of the site.

The development of the Pentagon was a collaboration between County and District Properties Limited and Chatham Borough Council. The shopping centre was built over the site of several demolished streets and properties, including George Street, Nelson Road, Fair Row, Solomons Road (partially), and Avondale Terrace. These areas had previously contained a mix of residential housing, small shops, and light industrial premises.

One of the most prominent businesses displaced by the development was Mackays of Chatham, a long-established book printing company. Mackays operated from a site stretching between Chatham High Street and what is now The Brook multi-storey car park, with its main entrance located on Fair Row. Their premises included both a modern building and a repurposed nineteenth-century candle factory. Mackays relocated to a new facility in Lordswood, south of Chatham, where it continued operating. It was acquired by CPI Group on 6 September 2000. The company continues to operate under the name CPI Books, maintaining its legacy in the UK’s printing industry.

The Pentagon Shopping Centre was designed in the brutalist architectural style typical of the period, characterised by its use of orange-red brick and grey concrete. The shopping centre complex includes the Brook multi-storey car park and the adjoining Mountbatten House, a high-rise office block that has remained largely vacant and underused for most of its existence.

Originally, the Pentagon included the Pentagon Bus Station, which was situated within the complex and accessible via ramps and pedestrian links. However, this has since been replaced by the nearby Chatham Waterfront Bus Station, located adjacent to the Pentagon. All local bus services now use the Waterfront Bus Station, and the former internal bus station infrastructure has been repurposed over the years as part of changing circumstances and recently ongoing redevelopment efforts in the area.

== Past tenants and features ==
Major retailers that have had units in The Pentagon in the past include C & A, Co-op Department Store, Wimpy, Bejams, Wilko, Dolcis, Ravel, Saxon Shoes and Birthdays as well as many independent, smaller retailers such as Snobs, Jones the Newsagents and John Menzies. There were also two adult evening venues – The Blue Grotto Wine Bar (in the late 70's) (situated by the public toilets, taxi rank and exit to Mountbatten House) which was a dry cleaners, and Scamps (later Van Damme) Night Club, which is now Chatham Bowl (bowling alley). This nightclub developed a particularly rough reputation in its later years. The centre was closed in 1990 for Refurbishment, and Reopened in 1991, removing many of the (by then) dated 1970s features. The fountain and seating were removed, along with an old-style escalator to the side of Sainsbury's, a staircase by C&A (now the former Wilkinsons unit) and a sloped walkway for wheelchair access to the upper level. In their place, The Green Lift Also No Longer Stopped on the First Floor after Refurbishment, and the Brown lift was Removed, also Before Refurbishment, the Blue Lift Originally Opened Up on the Other side into the Bus Station, and the Lift shaft Finished Exactly on the first floor meaning the Lift had to stop slightly Above the first floor, after Refurbishment, the Shaft was Extended so the lift could actually get to the first floor and now Opened into a Passage, but Since 2005, it has opened into Wilko, and in 2009, a Part of the bus station passage was Replaced by a JJB Sports, and it remained that way until the Bus Station closed, some new glass lifts and escalators were installed, along with new ceilings and lighting, giving the centre a much brighter atmosphere. The original flooring is still in place throughout much of the centre. When the centre first opened there were also children's play areas featuring a wooden snake, snail and whale - these were made of wood and metal and designed to be climbing frames or in the case of the snake a crawling frame. The play area was located opposite the existing Poundland store.

== Access ==
The Pentagon is situated next to the Chatham Waterfront Bus Station, which replaced the former Pentagon Bus Station. All local bus services currently use the Waterfront Bus Station.

== Future ==
Owing to the various alterations going ahead in Chatham town centre and to the new bus interchange facility in Globe Lane, as of June 2025 Mountbatten house is being converted to Flats, with conversions happening on the First Floor, Valenciennes Square. Which includes the newly finished toilets, Ascend Coworking innovative space and The James Williams Healthy Living Centre which is due to be completed in Winter 2025.

The Pentagon (and the rest of Chatham town centre) have suffered from external factors, such as the construction of Bluewater and Lakeside, two of the country's largest modern shopping centres, fairly close by.
