= Chatham Pentagon bus station =

Bus station in Chatham, Kent, England

Pentagon Bus Station
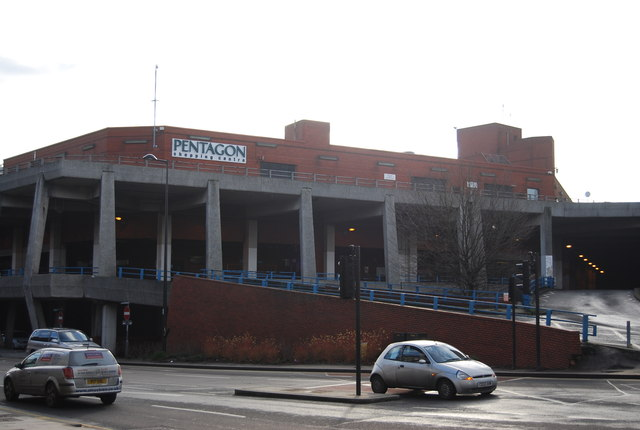

General information
- Location: Pentagon Shopping Centre, Chatham, Kent; United Kingdom
- Coordinates: 51.38380°N 0.52559°E
- Owner: Medway Council

History
- Opened: 16 October 1970
- Closed: 10 October 2011
Location

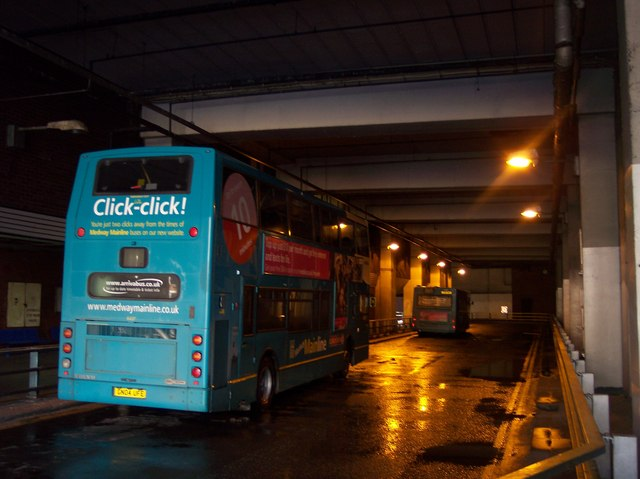
Arriva Medway Towns Alexander ALX400 bodied Volvo B7TL within Pentagon bus station in 2010 when the station was still active.

Pentagon Bus Station was the main bus interchange in Chatham, Kent, South East England. The Pentagon Bus Station opened on 16 October 1970 and was an integral part of the Pentagon Shopping Centre when it opened on 30 June 1975. Before its phased closure on the 30 September 2011 until 10 October 2011, 80% of local services started, terminated or passed through the centre.

As part of the redevelopment plans for Central Chatham, the Pentagon Bus Station was replaced in October 2011 by the Chatham Waterfront bus station on Globe Lane, adjacent to Military Rd. Space previously used by the bus station will be used to expand the Pentagon Shopping Centre. The new bus shelters have been designed to have living roofs (mainly sedums).

== History ==
The Pentagon Bus Station was arranged as a two-lane, one-way, ring road around the outside of the Pentagon Shopping Centre at the upper level. It had 18 bays, all on the inside of the road around the irregular 5 sided building. Bus access came from street level (The Brook) via one street level ramp and could exit via the same or a second ramp as appropriate.

In order to move the Pentagon Bus Station from the Pentagon Shopping Centre, Medway Council had to purchase the lease for the site back off Arriva Southern Counties, which was due to hold the lease until 2018. Arriva held the right to use the site as it had taken over Maidstone & District Motor Services, the previous incumbent. Access to the station by other operators has been a cause of historical controversy. The issue was placed within the scope of a 1993 Competition Commission inquiry into The supply of bus services in Mid and West Kent. As a result of the inquiry, M&D were required to undertake to provide equal access at reasonable rates and conditions.

== Closure ==
In October 2013, Medway Council planned to turn the disused Pentagon Bus Station into a car park for its employees but as of 2015 all entrances have been fenced off.

In March 2022, as part of the redevelopment of Mountbatten House and the surrounding area, the street level (The Brook) entrance and exit ramps to the bus station were removed.

== See also ==
- Arriva Southern Counties
- Pentagon Shopping Centre
- Chatham Waterfront bus station
