= Medway Council elections =

Elections in Kent, England

Medway Council is the local authority for the unitary authority of Medway in Kent, England. It was created on 1 April 1998 replacing Gillingham Borough Council and Rochester-upon-Medway.

== Political control ==
The first election to the council was held in 1997, initially operating as a shadow authority until formally taking over from the two outgoing councils on 1 April 1998. Since 1997 political control of the council has been held by the following parties:

Party in control	Years
Labour	1997–1998
No overall control	1998–2003
Conservative	2003–2023
Labour	2023–present

=== Leadership ===
The leaders of the council since 2000 have been:

Councillor	Party	From	To
Rodney Chambers	Conservative	May 2000	27 May 2015
Alan Jarrett	Conservative	27 May 2015	
Vince Maple	Labour	4 May 2023	

== Council composition ==
Composition of the council
Year	Conservative	Labour	Liberal Democrats (Note: Includes totals for the predecessors of the Liberal Democrats, the Liberal Party and SDP (both of which participated in the Alliance).)	UKIP	Independents & Others	Council control after election
Created from the merger of Rochester-upon-Medway and Gillingham (80 seats)
1997	20	39	21	0	0	Labour
2000	38	25	15	0	2	No overall control
New ward boundaries (55 seats)
2003	30	17	6	0	2	Conservative
2007	33	13	8	0	0	Conservative
2011	35	15	3	0	2	Conservative
2015	36	15	0	4	0	Conservative
2019	33	20	0	0	2	Conservative
New ward boundaries (59 seats)
2023	22	33	0	0	4	Labour

== Results maps ==
2003 results map

2007 results map

2011 results map

2015 results map

2019 results map

2023 results map

== By-election results ==
=== 1998–2003 ===
Gillingham South By-Election 19 February 1998
Party	Candidate	Votes	%	±%
Liberal Democrats	Dayantha Liyanage	656	54.3	+6.7
Labour	Pamela Holman	372	30.8	+0.8
Conservative	Roy Hunter	180	14.9	−7.5
Majority		284	23.5	
Turnout		1,208	27.0	
Liberal Democrats hold		Swing		

=== 2007–2011 ===
Rochester South and Horsted By-Election 8 May 2008
Party	Candidate	Votes	%	±%
Conservative	Trevor Clarke	1,847	48.7	+7.2
Labour	Adam Price	819	21.6	−5.0
Liberal Democrats	Viv Parker	767	20.2	+3.6
BNP	Brian Ravenscroft	257	6.8	+6.8
Green	Simon Marchant	104	2.7	+2.7
Majority		1,028	27.1	
Turnout		3,794	41.0	
Conservative hold		Swing		

This by-election was triggered by the resignation of Conservative Councillor John Ward

Luton & Wayfield By-Election 3 September 2009
Party	Candidate	Votes	%	±%
Conservative	Tashi Bhutia	1,042	36.9	+10.8
Labour	Sam Whittington	1,038	36.7	−12.3
Liberal Democrats	Gary Allanach	223	7.9	+7.9
UKIP	Robin Johnson	200	7.1	+7.1
BNP	Brian Ravenscroft	186	6.6	+6.6
Independent	Brian Cartwright	87	3.1	−21.9
Green	Sarah D'Angelo	51	1.8	+1.8
Majority		4	0.2	
Turnout		2,827	29.8	
Conservative gain from Labour		Swing		

This by-election was triggered by the resignation of Labour Councillor Dennis McFarlane

River Ward By-Election 12 August 2010
Party	Candidate	Votes	%	±%
Conservative	David Craggs	617	45.8	
Labour	John Jones	544	40.4	
Liberal Democrats	Garry Harrison	104	7.7	
Green	Steven Keevil	45	3.3	
BNP	Brian Ravenscroft	39	2.8	
English Democrat	Ron Sands	33	2.4	
Majority		73	5.3	
Turnout		1,382		
Conservative gain from Labour		Swing		

This by-election was triggered by the resignation of Labour Councillor Bill Esterson

River Ward By-Election 21 October 2010
Party	Candidate	Votes	%	±%
Labour	John Jones	695	45.5	
Conservative	Andrew Mackness	631	41.3	
Liberal Democrats	Garry Harrison	92	6.0	
UKIP	Anthony Cook	42	2.8	
Green	Steven Keevil	36	2.4	
English Democrat	Ron Sands	31	2.0	
Majority		64	4.2	
Turnout		1527	25.7	
Labour gain from Conservative		Swing		

This by-election was triggered by the resignation of Conservative Councillor David Craggs

=== 2011–2015 ===
Peninsula By-Election 20 November 2014
Party	Candidate	Votes	%	±%
UKIP	Christopher Irvine	2,850	48.3	+48.3
Conservative	Ron Sands	1,965	33.3	−20.9
Labour	Pete Tungate	716	12.1	−8.6
Green	Clive Gregory	314	5.3	−2.1
Liberal Democrats	Christopher Sams	60	1.0	−5.3
Majority		885	15.0	
Turnout		5,905		
UKIP gain from Conservative		Swing		

=== 2015–2019 ===
Strood South by-election 20 October 2016
Party	Candidate	Votes	%	±%
Conservative	Josie Iles	724	38.4	+3.4
Labour	Isaac Igwe	521	27.7	+3.4
UKIP	Karl Weller	480	25.5	−13.2
Green	Steve Dyke	74	3.9	N/A
Liberal Democrats	Isabelle Cherry	62	3.3	N/A
English Democrat	Mike Russell	23	1.2	N/A
Majority		203	10.7	
Turnout		1,884	16.74	
Conservative gain from UKIP		Swing		

The by-election was triggered by the resignation of UKIP Councillor Catriona Brown-Reckless

Rainham Central by-election 3 November 2016
Party	Candidate	Votes	%	±%
Conservative	Jan Aldous	1,448	61.1	
UKIP	Mark Mencattelli	389	16.4	
Labour	Simon Allen	320	13.5	
Liberal Democrats	Paul Chaplin	137	5.8	
Green	George Meegan	61	2.6	
English Democrat	Mike Russell	14	0.6	
Majority		1,059	44.7	
Turnout		2,369	24.0	
Conservative hold		Swing		

The by-election was triggered by the death of Conservative Councillor Mike O'Brien

Rochester West by-election 8 March 2018
Party	Candidate	Votes	%	±%
Labour	Alex Paterson	1,212	47.5	+26.5
Conservative	Alan Kew	1007	39.5	−4.0
Liberal Democrats	Martin Rose	119	4.7	+1.0
Green	Sonia Hyner	107	4.2	−6.1
UKIP	Rob McCulloch Martin	104	4.1	−16.2
Majority		205	8.0	−5.0
Turnout		2,549	33	
Labour gain from Conservative		Swing		

The by-election was triggered by the resignation of Conservative Councillor Kelly Tolhurst

=== 2019–2023 ===
Princes Park by-election 26 August 2021
Party	Candidate	Votes	%	±%
Conservative	Robert George Benedict Lammas	961	67.1	+19.1
Labour	John Gower Strevens	313	21.9	−5.6
Green	Sonia Lesley Hyner	52	3.6	N/A
Independent	Matthew Bernard Durcan	51	3.6	N/A
Liberal Democrats	John Edward Castle	49	3.4	N/A
Majority		648	45.2	
Turnout		1,432	18.8	
Conservative hold		Swing		

Strood North by-election 26 August 2021
Party	Candidate	Votes	%	±%
Labour	Zöe Angela Van Dyke	913	37.0	+6.4
Conservative	Mark Paul Joy	728	29.5	−2.5
Green	Catriona Margaret Jamieson	565	10.5	+1.0
Independent	Christopher Stuart Spalding	216	8.8	N/A
Liberal Democrats	Alan Edward Wells	39	1.6	N/A
Majority		185	7.5	
Turnout		2,466	23.5	
Labour gain from Conservative		Swing		

Rochester East by-election 16 December 2021
Party	Candidate	Votes	%	±%
Labour	Lauren Edwards	870	63.3	+15.2
Conservative	Brian Griffin	388	28.2	+8.6
Green	Bernard Hyde	69	5.0	−9.2
Liberal Democrats	Sarah Manuel	48	3.5	−2.8
Majority		482	35.1	
Turnout		1,375		
Labour hold		Swing		

Peninsula by-election 8 December 2022
Party	Candidate	Votes	%	±%
Independent	George Crozer	1,038	46.6	+46.6
Conservative	Harold Ogunfemi	371	16.7	−9.2
Green	Julian Sutton	255	11.5	+1.5
Independent	Chris Spalding	230	10.3	+10.3
Labour	David Hodges	215	9.7	−0.4
Independent	Sharon Jackson	89	4.0	+4.0
Liberal Democrats	Ben Rist	29	1.3	+1.3
Majority		667	30.0	
Turnout		2,227		
Independent hold		Swing		

=== 2023–2027 ===
Gillingham South by-election 6 February 2025
Party	Candidate	Votes	%	±%
Labour	Liubov Nestorova	706	37.4	−19.9
Reform	Rizvi Rawoof	506	26.8	+26.8
Conservative	Saboor Ahmed	330	17.5	−0.5
Green	Trish Marchant	167	8.8	−4.4
Liberal Democrats	Onyx Rist	99	5.2	−6.2
SDP	Peter Wheeler	69	3.7	+3.7
Heritage	Roshan Bhunnoo	12	0.6	+0.6
Majority		200	10.6	
Turnout		1,889		
Labour hold		Swing		

Rochester East and Warren Wood by-election 6 February 2025
Party	Candidate	Votes	%	±%
Reform	David Finch	870		
Reform	John Vye	802		
Labour	Carolyn Hart	781		
Labour	Robert Wyatt	717		
Conservative	George Clarke	479		
Conservative	Tolga Sirlan	432		
Green	Doug Bray	141		
Green	Jeremy Spyby-Steanson	109		
Liberal Democrats	Anita Holloway	81		
Liberal Democrats	Sarah Manuel	80		
Heritage	Peter Burch	21		
Majority				
Turnout		2,317	24.4%	
Reform gain from Labour		Swing		
Reform gain from Labour		Swing		

Cuxton, Halling and Riverside by-election 23 July 2026
Party	Candidate	Votes	%	±%
Reform	William Burvill	838	35.7	+35.7
Conservative	Richard Thorne	726	30.9	−12.9
Green	Trish Marchant	482	20.5	−11.4
Labour	Iain Childs	269	11.4	−9.2
Liberal Democrats	Ronald Gillett	35	1.5	−2.3
Majority		112	4.8	
Turnout		2,350		
Reform gain from Conservative		Swing		
