= 2027 Medway Council election =

2027 English local government election

- 6 May 2027

All 59 seats to Medway Council 30 seats needed for a majority
Leader	Vince Maple	George Perfect
Party	Labour Co-op	Conservative
Leader's seat	Chatham Central & Brompton	Rainham North
Last election	33 seats, 45.0%	22 seats, 38.4%
Current seats	31	17
Leader	Michael Pearce	David Finch
Party	Independent	Reform
Leader's seat	Hoo St Werburgh & High Halstow	Rochester East & Warren Wood
Last election	4 seats, 5.6%	0 seats, 0.1%
Current seats	8	3
Incumbent Leader
Vince Maple
Labour Co-op

The 2027 Medway Council election will be held on 6 May 2027 to elect members of Medway Council in Kent, England. This will be on the same day as other local elections held across the United Kingdom.

== Background ==
=== Local government reorganisation ===
Due to proposed structural changes to local government in England, the 2023 election would have been the final election to the council before it was abolished and replaced by North Kent Council, a new unitary authority. However, on 7 September 2026, the government announced it was withdrawing plans for the planned restructuring pending review. Following this announcement, local elections due to be held in 2027 under the existing local electoral calendar would proceed.

== Summary ==
=== Election result ===
2027 Medway Council election
Party	Candidates	Seats	Gains	Losses	Net gain/loss	Seats %	Votes %	Votes	+/−
Labour		31 (Note: Current seats.)							
Conservative		17							
Independent		8							
Reform		3							
