= Tris Osborne =

British politician

Tris Osborne MP
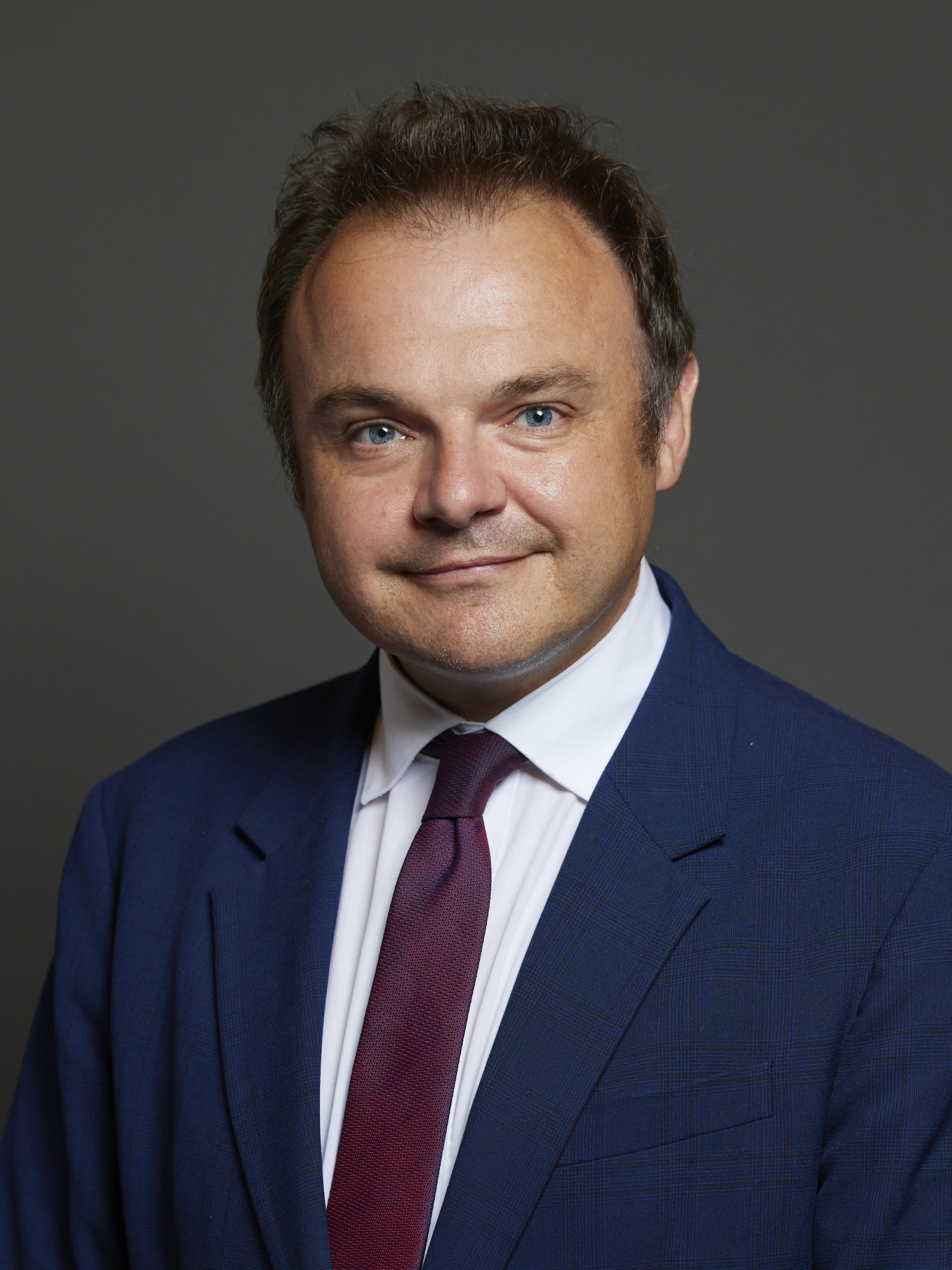
- Official portrait, 2024

Member of Parliament for Chatham and Aylesford
- Incumbent
- Assumed office 4 July 2024
- Preceded by: Tracey Crouch
- Majority: 1,998 (4.9%)

Personal details
- Party: Labour
- Education: Durham University
- Website: www.trisosborne.com

Tristan John Osborne is a British Labour Party politician who has served as the Member of Parliament (MP) for Chatham and Aylesford since 2024.

== Early life ==
Osborne is a native of the Medway area in Kent and grew up in Rochester. He attended St William of Perth Catholic Primary School in Rochester before receiving a scholarship to the private King's School, Rochester due to being a chorister at Rochester Cathedral. He has a Bachelor of Science degree in natural sciences (2004) and a Master of Arts degree in business management (2006) from College of St Hild and St Bede, part of Durham University. Osborne, who is gay, was an LGBT activist at university, and has since continued to support local LGBT communities, representing the local Labour team at Medway Pride each year.

== Early career ==
After leaving university Osborne worked for a banking start-up specialising in financial risk from July 2006 to November 2013 and for a consultancy firm advising political parties about business regulation from December 2013 to July 2016. Whilst working in London he was a special constable with the Metropolitan Police in Greenwich and Charlton. Osborne then moved back to the Medway area and obtained a teaching qualification in geography from Canterbury Christ Church University in 2017. He was a geography teacher at Strood Academy from July 2017 to August 2023 and Stone Lodge School from August 2023 to July 2024.

== Political career ==
Osborne contested the 2007 local elections in the Medway as one of the Labour Party candidates in the three-member Strood North ward but was not elected. He contested the 2011 local elections in Medway as one of the Labour Party candidates in the three-member Luton and Wayfield ward and was elected. He was re-elected at the 2015 and 2019 local elections. At the 2023 local elections he was elected from the three-member Rochester East and Warren Wood ward. At the election Labour gained control of Medway Council and Osborne was appointed cabinet member for community safety and enforcement. On 17 December 2024, he announced his resignation as councillor for Medway via a post on X (formerly Twitter) after serving for 13 years.

Osborne contested the 2015 general election as the Labour Party candidate in Chatham and Aylesford but was defeated by Conservative incumbent Tracey Crouch. He contested the 2016 police and crime commissioner elections as the Labour Party candidate in Kent but was defeated by Conservative Matthew Scott.

Osborne contested the 2024 general election as the Labour Party candidate in Chatham and Aylesford and was elected with a majority of 1,998. On 12 September 2024, he made his maiden speech in the House of Commons during the David Amess adjournment debate.

In May 2026, Osborne was one of more than 100 MPs who signed a letter backing Keir Starmer amidst criticism from other Labour MPs calling for him to resign.

== Electoral history ==
Electoral history of Tris Osborne
Election	Constituency	Party	Votes	Result
2007 local	Medway - Strood North Ward	Labour Party	1,365	Not elected
2011 local	Medway - Luton and Wayfield Ward	Labour Party	1,326	Elected
2015 general	Chatham and Aylesford	Labour Party	10,159	Not elected
2015 local	Medway - Luton and Wayfield Ward	Labour Party	1,774	Elected
2016 police	Kent	Labour Party	50,978	Not elected
2019 local	Medway - Luton and Wayfield Ward	Labour Party	1,045	Elected
2023 local	Medway - Rochester East and Warren Wood Ward	Labour Party	1,347	Elected
2024 general	Chatham and Aylesford	Labour Party	13,689	Elected
