= 2015 Medway Council election =

2015 UK local government election

← 2011	7 May 2015	2019 →

All 55 seats to Medway Council 28 seats needed for a majority
	First party	Second party	Third party
	Con	Lab	UKIP
Leader	Rodney Chambers	Vince Maple	None
Party	Conservative	Labour	UKIP
Leader's seat	Hempstead and Wigmore	Chatham; Central	None
Last election	35 seats, 46.05%	15 seats, 34.46%	0 seats, 1.80%
Seats won	36	15	4
Seat change	▲1	Steady	▲4
Popular vote	120,319	78,195	61,272
Percentage	42.9%	27.9%	21.8%
Swing	▲3.2%	▼6.6%	▲20.0%
- Map of results of 2015 election
Leader of the Council before election
Rodney Chambers
Conservative
Leader of the Council
Alan Jarrett
Conservative

The 2015 Medway Council election took place on 7 May 2015, alongside the 2015 UK General Election. The elections were to elect all 55 seats across 22 wards. The Conservatives held the council, with 36 seats (a majority of 16). The Labour Party won 15 seats, and UKIP took 4.

Following the announcement of the results, the Trade Unionist and Socialist Coalition called for a re-count in Rainham North ward after their candidate received no votes, despite claiming that he had voted for himself; however, the council's returning officer confirmed that the result was correct and no further action could be taken.

== Results summary ==
Medway Council Local Election 2015
Party	Seats	Gains	Losses	Net gain/loss	Seats %	Votes %	Votes	+/−
Conservative	36			+1	65.5	42.9	120,319	+3.2
Labour	15			0	27.3	27.9	78,195	-6.6
UKIP	4			+4	7.2	21.8	61,272	+20.0
Liberal Democrats	0	0	0	-3	0.0	3.2	8,998	-5.6
Green	0	0	0	0	0.0	2.3	6,551	0.3
TUSC	0	0	0	0	0.0	1.2	3,402	+0.7
Independent	0	0	0	-2	0.0	0.6	1,759	-3.8
English Democrat	0	0	0	0	0.0	0.1	120	-1.5

A total of 1,735 ballot papers were rejected.

== Council composition ==
Prior to the election, the composition of the council was:

↓
35	15	3	2
Conservative	Labour	LD	I

After the election, to composition of the council was:

↓
36	15	4
Conservative	Labour	UKIP

I - Independent

== Ward results ==
An asterisk denotes an incumbent councillor seeking re-election.

=== Chatham Central ===
Chatham Central
Party	Candidate	Votes	%	±%
Labour	Paul Goodwin*	2,258	17.3	−3.7
Labour	Vince Maple*	2,238	17.1	−3.5
Labour	Julie Nora Shaw*	1,987	15.2	−6.4
UKIP	Robin Charles Johnson	1,535	11.7	+8.2
Conservative	Patricia Anne Gulvin	1,394	10.6	+1.7
Conservative	David Peter Jarrett	1,258	9.6	+1.0
Conservative	Andrew Kennedy	1,208	9.2	+1.0
Green	Luke Ashley Balnave	727	5.6	N/A
Green	John Lesley Gibson	263	2.0	N/A
TUSC	Steven Hancock	219	1.7	N/A
Majority		452	3.5	
Turnout		13,087		
Labour hold		Swing		
Labour hold		Swing		
Labour hold		Swing		

=== Cuxton and Halling ===
Cuxton and Halling
Party	Candidate	Votes	%	±%
Conservative	Matt Fearn	1,761	53.8	−9.6
UKIP	Paul Monck	958	29.3	N/A
Labour	Michael Gerald Evans	518	15.8	−20.8
TUSC	Allan Yates	37	1.1	N/A
Majority		803	24.5	
Turnout		3,274		
Conservative hold		Swing		

=== Gillingham North ===
Gillingham North
Party	Candidate	Votes	%	±%
Labour	Pat Cooper*	2,449	16.5	+5.8
Labour	Andy Stamp*	2,258	15.2	+4.5
Labour	Adam Robert William Price*	2,026	13.7	+2.5
UKIP	Mark Mencattelli	1,846	12.4	N/A
Conservative	Nusrat Bibi Ahmed	1,475	9.9	+2.7
Conservative	Bob Russell	1,396	9.4	+3.3
Conservative	Kwashie Amartei Anang	1,368	9.2	+4.2
Green	Trich Marchant	646	4.4	+2.1
Liberal Democrats	Steve Kearney	436	2.9	−0.2
Liberal Democrats	Sid Kingman	334	2.3	−0.7
Liberal Democrats	Anita Sheila Webber	327	2.2	−0.4
TUSC	Andrew Paul Travers	278	1.9	+0.9
Majority		180	1.3	
Turnout		14,839		
Labour gain from Independent		Swing		
Labour gain from Independent		Swing		
Labour hold		Swing		

Cllrs Cooper and Stamp both were previously elected as Independent councillors in 2011.

=== Gillingham South ===
Gillingham South
Party	Candidate	Votes	%	±%
Labour	Clive Stanley William Johnson	1,995	11.2	0
Labour	Naushabah Parveen Khan	1,909	10.7	+0.3
Labour	Dan McDonald	1,877	10.6	+1.0
UKIP	Terry Allen	1,777	10.0	+7.2
Conservative	Saboor Ahmed	1,537	8.6	+1.7
UKIP	John Farrell	1,469	8.3	+6.0
UKIP	Rob McCulloch Martin	1,413	8.0	N/A
Conservative	Shirley Margaret Pamela Griffiths	1,405	7.9	−0.1
Conservative	John Richard Amey	1,343	7.5	+2.2
Liberal Democrats	Geoff Juby*	871	4.9	−6.5
Liberal Democrats	Tony Jeacock	697	3.9	−6.7
Liberal Democrats	Chris Sams	629	3.5	−6.9
Green	Simon Philip Marchant	552	3.1	+0.2
TUSC	Jacqui Berry	316	1.8	−0.3
Majority		100	0.6	
Turnout		17,790		
Labour gain from Liberal Democrats		Swing		
Labour gain from Liberal Democrats		Swing		
Labour hold		Swing		

=== Hempstead and Wigmore ===
Hempstead and Wigmore
Party	Candidate	Votes	%	±%
Conservative	Diane Margaret Chambers*	3,666	40.5	+11.9
Conservative	Rodney Brian Chambers*	3,555	39.3	+11.2
Labour	Ahmed Mutahir Khan	828	9.2	+1.5
Labour	Nabilah Khan	749	8.3	+1.8
TUSC	Stephen John Wilkins	245	2.7	N/A
Majority		2,727	30.1	
Turnout		9,043		
Conservative hold		Swing		
Conservative hold		Swing		

=== Lordswood and Capstone ===
Lordswood and Capstone
Party	Candidate	Votes	%	±%
Conservative	Alan Leslie Jarrett*	2,711	36.1	+4.3
Conservative	David Robert Wildey*	2,341	31.7	+2.8
Labour	Nick Alderson-Rice	1,110	15.0	−0.8
Labour	Ambrose Nwodoh	987	13.4	−0.8
TUSC	Tony Baker	233	3.2	N/A
Majority		1,231	16.7	
Turnout		7,382		
Conservative hold		Swing		
Conservative hold		Swing		

=== Luton and Wayfield ===
Luton and Wayfield
Party	Candidate	Votes	%	±%
Labour	Tris Osborne*	1,774	12.5	−3.0
Labour	Sam Craven*	1,748	12.3	−5.1
Conservative	Michael Franklin	1,745	12.3	−0.7
Labour	Christine Janice Godwin*	1,685	11.9	−5.2
UKIP	Stephen Harper	1,508	10.6	N/A
Conservative	Stephen John Peachell	1,496	10.6	−4.2
Conservative	Simon John Wray	1,411	10.0	−1.6
UKIP	Claire Rachel Sparham	1,353	9.6	N/A
UKIP	Maurice Granville Sparham	1,171	8.3	N/A
TUSC	Alison Burns	154	1.1	−0.8
English Democrat	Mike Russell	120	0.8	N/A
Majority		60	0.4	
Turnout		14,165		
Conservative gain from Labour		Swing		
Labour hold		Swing		
Labour hold		Swing		

=== Peninsula ===
Peninsula
Party	Candidate	Votes	%	±%
UKIP	Roy Freshwater	2,866	14.7	N/A
Conservative	Phil Filmer*	2,722	14.0	−7.9
UKIP	Mick Pendergast	2,610	13.4	N/A
Conservative	Michael Dale	2,461	12.6	−7.2
Conservative	Jim Nugent	2,440	12.5	−5.7
UKIP	Mike Yates	2,310	11.9	N/A
Labour	Julia Cherry	1,200	6.2	−2.1
Labour	Peter John Tungate	1,091	5.6	−2.1
Labour	Patrick Minhard	931	4.8	−2.7
Independent	Ron Sands	691	3.5	N/A
TUSC	Chas Berry	147	0.8	N/A
Majority		149	0.8	
Turnout		19,469		
UKIP gain from Conservative		Swing		
UKIP gain from Conservative		Swing		
Conservative hold		Swing		

Sands previously stood as a candidate for the English Democrats in 2011.

=== Princes Park ===
Princes Park
Party	Candidate	Votes	%	±%
Conservative	Tashi Bhutia	1,811	24.5	−4.6
Conservative	Gloria Blessing Chukwuka Opara	1,633	22.1	−3.7
UKIP	Adam Crombie	1,144	15.4	N/A
Labour	Alan Higgins	1,029	13.9	−4.5
UKIP	Richard John Wozencroft	907	12.2	N/A
Labour	Simon Wady	821	11.1	−7.9
TUSC	Janet Sylvia Baker	60	0.8	N/A
Majority		489	6.7	
Turnout		7,405		
Conservative hold		Swing		
Conservative hold		Swing		

=== Rainham Central ===
Rainham Central
Party	Candidate	Votes	%	±%
Conservative	Rehman Chishti	4,386	25.6	+1.8
Conservative	Barry Joseph Kemp	3,473	20.3	−0.1
Conservative	Mike O'Brien	3,115	18.2	+2.4
UKIP	Rebecca Mencattelli	1,854	10.8	+7.4
Labour	Mark Anthony Last	1,405	8.2	+0.6
Labour	Tarek James Maddison	1,018	6.0	+1.5
Labour	James Richard Smith	946	5.5	+1.9
Green	Mary Winifred Smtih	665	3.9	+1.6
TUSC	Carole Diane Sammon	165	1.0	N/A
Independent	Karen Dawn Streatfield	92	0.5	N/A
Majority		1,261	7.4	
Turnout		17,119		
Conservative hold		Swing		
Conservative hold		Swing		
Conservative hold		Swing		

=== Rainham North ===
Rainham North
Party	Candidate	Votes	%	±%
Conservative	David John Carr*	2,247	26.5	−1.2
Conservative	Martin Potter	1,910	22.6	−3.7
UKIP	Vaughan Baden Hewett*	1,245	14.7	+10.8
UKIP	Emily Catherine Knowles	850	10.0	+6.8
Labour	John William Lloyd	837	9.9	−1.1
Labour	Chiron Peter Mottram	598	7.1	−3.5
Liberal Democrats	John Edward Castle	272	3.2	−6.3
Green	Neil Peter Williams	254	3.0	N/A
Liberal Democrats	Terry Lucy	251	3.0	−4.8
TUSC	Paul Andrew Dennis	0	0.0	N/A
Majority		665	7.9	
Turnout		8,464		
Conservative hold		Swing		
Conservative hold		Swing		

Hewett was previously elected in 2011 as a Conservative councillor.

=== Rainham South ===
Rainham South
Party	Candidate	Votes	%	±%
Conservative	Howard Francis Doe*	3,606	22.1	+2.5
Conservative	David Royle*	2,892	17.7	−1.3
Conservative	Leslie Alan Wicks*	2,257	13.8	−2.8
UKIP	Jean Katherine Shirly Appleton	1,817	11.1	+7.2
Labour	Gillian Valerie Pearson	1,485	9.1	−0.8
UKIP	Susan Mary Marsh	1,468	9.0	N/A
Labour	Josh Henry Gray	1,342	8.2	−1.2
Labour	Louwella Margaret Prenter	1,037	6.4	−1.0
Independent	Mike Walters	249	1.5	N/A
TUSC	Susan Mason-Saunders	177	1.1	N/A
Majority		440	2.7	
Turnout		16,330		
Conservative hold		Swing		
Conservative hold		Swing		
Conservative hold		Swing		

=== River ===
River
Party	Candidate	Votes	%	±%
Conservative	Andrew Mackness*	1,698	24.3	−0.7
Conservative	Habib Odunlamin Sulaiman Tejan	1,354	19.3	−7.5
Labour	John Alun Charles Jones	1,033	14.8	−7.0
Labour	Mark William Edwin Jones	1,001	14.3	−1.5
UKIP	Chris Spalding	863	12.3	N/A
UKIP	June Winton	626	8.9	N/A
Green	Michael Edward Phillips	365	5.2	+2.2
TUSC	Naomi Catherine Sayers	62	0.9	N/A
Majority		321	4.5	
Turnout		7,002		
Conservative hold		Swing		
Conservative hold		Swing		

=== Rochester East ===
Rochester East
Party	Candidate	Votes	%	±%
Labour	Teresa Margaret Murray*	1,861	20.7	−10.0
Labour	Nick Bowler*	1,721	19.2	−10.7
Conservative	Sean Michael Varnham	1,406	15.6	−0.7
UKIP	Chris Irvine	1,209	13.4	N/A
Conservative	Mohamed Rizvi Rawoof	1,095	12.2	−0.5
UKIP	Trevor James Shields	1,039	11.6	N/A
Green	William James Davies	560	6.2	+1.2
TUSC	Daniel Burn	98	1.1	N/A
Majority		315	3.6	
Turnout		8,989		
Labour hold		Swing		
Labour hold		Swing		

=== Rochester South and Horsted ===
Rochester South and Horsted
Party	Candidate	Votes	%	±%
Conservative	Trevor Anthony Clarke*	2,984	15.6	−5.1
Conservative	Sylvia Mary Griffin*	2,679	14.0	−4.6
Conservative	Rupert David Fearon Turpin*	2,604	13.6	−2.4
UKIP	Keith Fletcher	1,885	9.9	+5.4
UKIP	Alan William Collins	1,666	8.7	N/A
UKIP	Frank Moreton	1,662	8.7	N/A
Labour	Del Munton	1,617	8.5	−2.3
Labour	Elaine Thomas	1,431	7.5	−2.5
Labour	Joe Murray	1,405	7.3	−2.9
Green	Bernard Edward Hyde	576	3.0	−0.1
Liberal Democrats	Viv Parker	502	2.6	−1.6
TUSC	Emma Sarah White	116	0.6	−1.3
Majority		719	3.7	
Turnout		19,127		
Conservative hold		Swing		
Conservative hold		Swing		
Conservative hold		Swing		

=== Rochester West ===
Rochester West
Party	Candidate	Votes	%	±%
Conservative	Kelly Tolhurst*	2,418	23.9	−4.2
Conservative	Stuart Albert Tranter	1,884	18.6	−9.5
Labour	Rachel Catherine Garrick	1,169	11.6	−5.9
UKIP	Helen Knight	1,131	11.2	N/A
UKIP	Stephen Knight	1,066	10.5	N/A
Labour	Tony John Scudder	1,054	10.4	−4.0
Green	Clive Byrn Malcolm Gregory	575	5.7	−0.9
Green	David Fredrick John Heritage	405	4.0	−0.5
Liberal Democrats	Ken Juby	206	2.0	−2.2
Liberal Democrats	Nem Juby	142	1.4	−1.9
TUSC	Riven Gray	65	0.7	N/A
Majority		715	7.0	
Turnout		10,115		
Conservative hold		Swing		
Conservative hold		Swing		

=== Strood North ===
Strood North
Party	Candidate	Votes	%	±%
Conservative	Elizabeth Jane Chitty*	2,673	15.1	−2.3
Conservative	Stephen Ian Richard Iles	2,230	12.6	−4.6
Conservative	Phil Hall	2,138	12.1	−2.6
Labour	Stephen Alan Hubbard*	1,841	10.4	−4.9
UKIP	Ray Banks	1,791	10.1	N/A
Labour	Gareth Wilf Batts	1,636	9.3	−2.7
UKIP	Paul O'Rouke	1,630	9.2	N/A
Labour	Linda Beatrice Robson	1,500	8.5	−4.3
UKIP	Paul Rai	1,413	8.0	N/A
Green	Stephen William Dyke	630	3.6	N/A
TUSC	Sue Berry	195	1.1	−0.7
Majority		297	1.7	
Turnout		17,677		
Conservative gain from Labour		Swing		
Conservative hold		Swing		
Conservative hold		Swing		

=== Strood Rural ===
Strood Rural
Party	Candidate	Votes	%	±%
Conservative	John Williams	3,015	14.9	−4.7
Conservative	Peter Martin Hicks*	2,828	14.0	−5.4
Conservative	Gary David James Etheridge	2,737	13.5	−3.2
UKIP	Ben Cook	2,582	12.8	N/A
UKIP	Tom Mason*	2,475	12.2	N/A
UKIP	Peter Rodberg*	2,294	11.4	N/A
Labour	Julia Hawkins	1,278	6.3	−3.3
Labour	Avril Margaret Sime	1,144	5.7	−2.3
Labour	Jim Wyper	934	4.6	−2.8
Liberal Democrats	Vanessa Ann Roach	421	2.1	−1.1
Liberal Democrats	Andrew Lawrence Millsom	349	1.7	−1.4
TUSC	Rosilla Jane Ellwood	165	0.8	N/A
Majority		155	0.7	
Turnout		20,222		
Conservative hold		Swing		
Conservative hold		Swing		
Conservative hold		Swing		

=== Strood South ===
Strood South
Party	Candidate	Votes	%	±%
UKIP	Catriona Brown-Reckless	2,527	14.5	N/A
Conservative	John Fernley Nicholas Avey*	2,289	13.1	−3.3
UKIP	Mark Paul Joy	2,203	12.6	N/A
Conservative	Josie Iles*	2,085	12.0	−2.7
UKIP	Richard Thorne	1,898	10.9	N/A
Conservative	Harold Ogunfemi	1,734	9.9	−3.9
Labour	Rob Heathfield	1,583	9.1	−5.4
Labour	Ikechukwu Isaac Igwe	1,576	9.0	−6.2
Labour	Harinder Singh Mahil	1,411	8.1	−6.3
TUSC	Alec David Price	141	0.8	N/A
Majority		118	0.6	
Turnout		17,447		
UKIP gain from Labour		Swing		
UKIP gain from Conservative		Swing		
Conservative hold		Swing		

=== Twydall ===
Twydall
Party	Candidate	Votes	%	±%
Labour	Dorte Marianne Gilry*	2,547	16.9	−0.5
Labour	Glyn David Griffiths*	2,353	15.6	−1.2
Conservative	Anne-Claire Marie Andree Howard	2,287	15.2	+3.7
Conservative	Diana Marion Lawrence	2,214	14.7	+1.2
Labour	Mark Prenter	1,960	13.0	−5.1
Conservative	Tony Rocco	1,700	11.2	−1.2
Green	Rebecca Jane Lehmann	623	4.1	+1.5
Liberal Democrats	Veronica Anne Lewis	434	2.9	0
Liberal Democrats	Sheila Veronica Rose Kearney	432	2.9	+0.5
Liberal Democrats	David Alfred McDonnell	268	1.8	−0.6
TUSC	Ivor Andrew Lindsey Riddell	257	1.7	N/A
Majority		73	0.5	
Turnout		15,075		
Conservative gain from Labour		Swing		
Labour hold		Swing		
Labour hold		Swing		

=== Walderslade ===
Walderslade
Party	Candidate	Votes	%	±%
Conservative	David Frederick Brake*	2,445	30.0	+6.4
Conservative	Adrian Victor Henry Gulvin*	2,097	25.7	+6.9
UKIP	Linda Veronica Russell	1,211	14.8	N/A
Labour	Eddie Peake	1,024	12.6	+3.6
Labour	Robert Lee Pitt	897	11.0	+2.9
Liberal Democrats	Jim Percy	370	4.5	+2.3
TUSC	Liz Robinson	111	1.4	N/A
Majority		886	10.9	
Turnout		8,155		
Conservative hold		Swing		
Conservative hold		Swing		

=== Watling ===
Watling
Party	Candidate	Votes	%	±%
Conservative	Wendy Purdy	2,070	24.6	+6.8
Conservative	Asha Rani Rita Saroy	1,632	19.4	+2.0
Liberal Democrats	Diana Mary Smith*	1,180	14.1	−7.6
Labour	Benjamin Pranczke	1,030	12.3	−0.5
Labour	Raja Miah	1,017	12.1	−2.1
Liberal Democrats	Paul Chaplin	877	10.4	−6.7
Green	Richard James Lehmann	437	5.2	N/A
TUSC	Avril Eleene Roberts	161	1.9	N/A
Majority		452	5.3	
Turnout		8,404		
Conservative gain from Liberal Democrats		Swing		
Conservative hold		Swing		
