= Chatham Central =

Chatham Central can refer to:

- Chatham Central (ward), a former electoral ward of Medway Council in Chatham, Kent, England
- Chatham Central railway station, a disused railway station in Chatham, Kent, England, operational 1892–1911
- Chatham Central High School, a public high school in Bear Creek, North Carolina, United States
