= Chatham Central (ward) =

Former electoral ward of Medway, Kent, England

- Former electoral ward for the Medway Council
- Chatham Central ward boundaries from 2003 to 2023
- District: Medway

Former electoral ward
- Created: 1998
- Abolished: 2023
- GSS code: E05002249

Chatham Central was one of the wards in Medway, England. It returned councillors to Medway Council. The population of this ward in Chatham, Kent, at the 2011 Census was 16,413. In the 2019 Medway Council election, it elected three Labour Councillors: Harinder Mahil, Vince Maple, and Siju Adeoye. In December 2022, Adeoye joined the Conservative Party. The ward was replaced by Chatham Central and Brompton ward for the 2023 Medway Council election.

== Location ==
Chatham Central covered the area of Chatham south of the A2 to the junction of Walderslade Road and Magpie Hall Road. Bounded by Magpie Hall Road and Maidstone Road, it also included the area around Balfour Junior stretching out to Boundary Road and the All Saints area of Castle Road and Gordon Road.

== Neighbouring Wards ==
Chatham Central was adjacent to the following wards:

- River
- Luton and Wayfield
- Rochester South and Horsted
- Rochester East
