= St George's Chapel, Chatham =

Church in United Kingdom

St George's Centre, Chatham
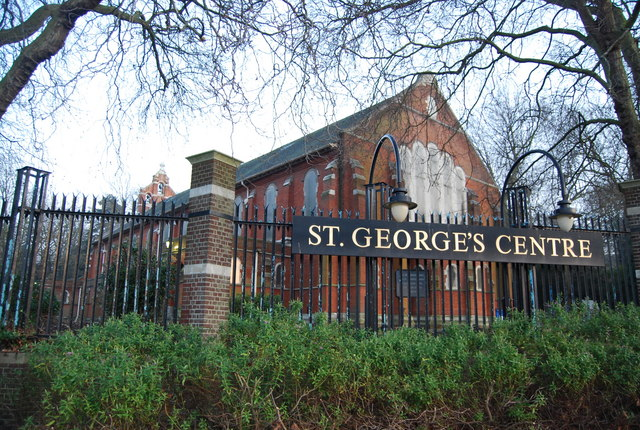
- Interactive map of the St George's Centre, Chatham area

General information
- Location: Medway, United Kingdom, United Kingdom
- Coordinates: 51°23′50″N 0°32′05″E
- Current tenants: Medway Council
- Construction started: 27 April 1905
- Inaugurated: 19 December 1906
- Owner: Medway Council

Technical details
- Floor count: 1

Other information
- Parking: Car park

Website
- www.medway.gov.uk/directory_record/2299/st_georges_centre

St George’s Chapel is a Grade II listed chapel in Chatham, Kent, England. It is located within the former Chatham Dockyard area, historically known as HMS Pembroke, which served the Royal Navy for centuries. The chapel is notable for its strong naval associations.

It is Grade II listed and is built in a design similar to that of the chapel at HMS Drake, Plymouth, now known as HMNB Devonport.

== History ==
The foundation stone of St. George's Chapel within the barracks was laid on 27 April 1905 and on completion, was dedicated by the Lord Bishop of Rochester John Harmer, as St George's Church on 19 December 1906.

St. George's remains a naval memorial centre, managed by the local authority, and is rich with windows and memorials dedicated to naval personnel. One example is a stained glass window that was unveiled by Princess Elizabeth on 29 October 1950.

On 29 March 2013, BBC Radio 4's Any Questions? was broadcast from the chapel. It was presented by Ritula Shah and guests included Tom Newton Dunn, the political editor of The Sun newspaper; Clare Gerada (GP and medical director of the NHS Practitioner Health Programme); Lord Trimble (Irish Politician); and Angela Eagle (Labour Party MP).

Meetings of Medway Council are now held in the chapel.

== See also ==
- Saint George: Devotions, traditions and prayers
