= Mayor of Medway =

Political position in the UK

- Incumbent; Cllr Trevor Clarke since 14 May 2025
- Style: The Worshipful
- Member of: Medway Council
- Nominator: Medway Councillors
- Appointer: Medway Councillors
- Term length: 1 year, renewable
- Inaugural holder: Dayantha Liyanage
- Formation: 1999
- Deputy: Deputy Mayor Cllr Wayne Spring
- Salary: None
- Website: Official website

The office of Mayor of Medway is the ceremonial figurehead of Medway Council in Kent, England. The Office is currently held by Cllr Trevor Clarke, who assumed the post on 14 May 2025.

== Role ==
The Mayor is elected annually from among the councillors. The mayor presides over the meetings of the full council, is the first citizen of the district, and is the official representative of the Crown.

Within the borough of Medway, the Mayor of Medway takes precedence, as determined by the Local Government Act 1972, over all other people except royalty or the Lord Lieutenant of the County (if representing the King).

Medway unitary authority was created on 1 April 1998 when the City of Rochester-upon-Medway amalgamated with Gillingham Borough Council and part of Kent County Council to form Medway Council. The Mayor of Medway continues the Rochester City Council tradition of serving as Admiral of the River Medway, with jurisdiction between Hawkwood and Sheerness.

The mayor attends a number of Civic functions and public events throughout Medway and is also entitled to wear certain items of Civic regalia and the Medway Coat of Arms.

== List of mayors of Medway ==
Date	Terms	Mayor
1999–2000	1	Dayantha Liyanage
2000–01	1	Richard Andrews
2001–02	1	Tony Goulden, ex-guitarist with pop group Vanity Fare
2002-03	1	Ted Baker
2003-04	1	Nick Bowler
2004-05	1	Ken Webber
2005-06	1	Angela Prodger
2007-08	1	Val Goulden
2008-09	1	David Carr
2009-10	1	David Royle
2010-11	1	David Brake
2011-12	1	Ted Baker
2012-13	1	Vaughan Hewett
2013-14	1	Josie Iles
2014-16	2	Barry Kemp
2016-17	1	Stuart Tranter
2017-18	1	David Wildey
2018-19	1	Steve Iles
2019-21	2	Habib Tejan
2021-22	1	Jan Aldous
2023-24	1	Nina Gurung
2024-25	1	Marian Nestorov
2025-26	1	Trevor Clarke

== See also ==
- Mayor of Gillingham
