= Lauren Edwards =

British Labour Party politician

Lauren Edwards MP
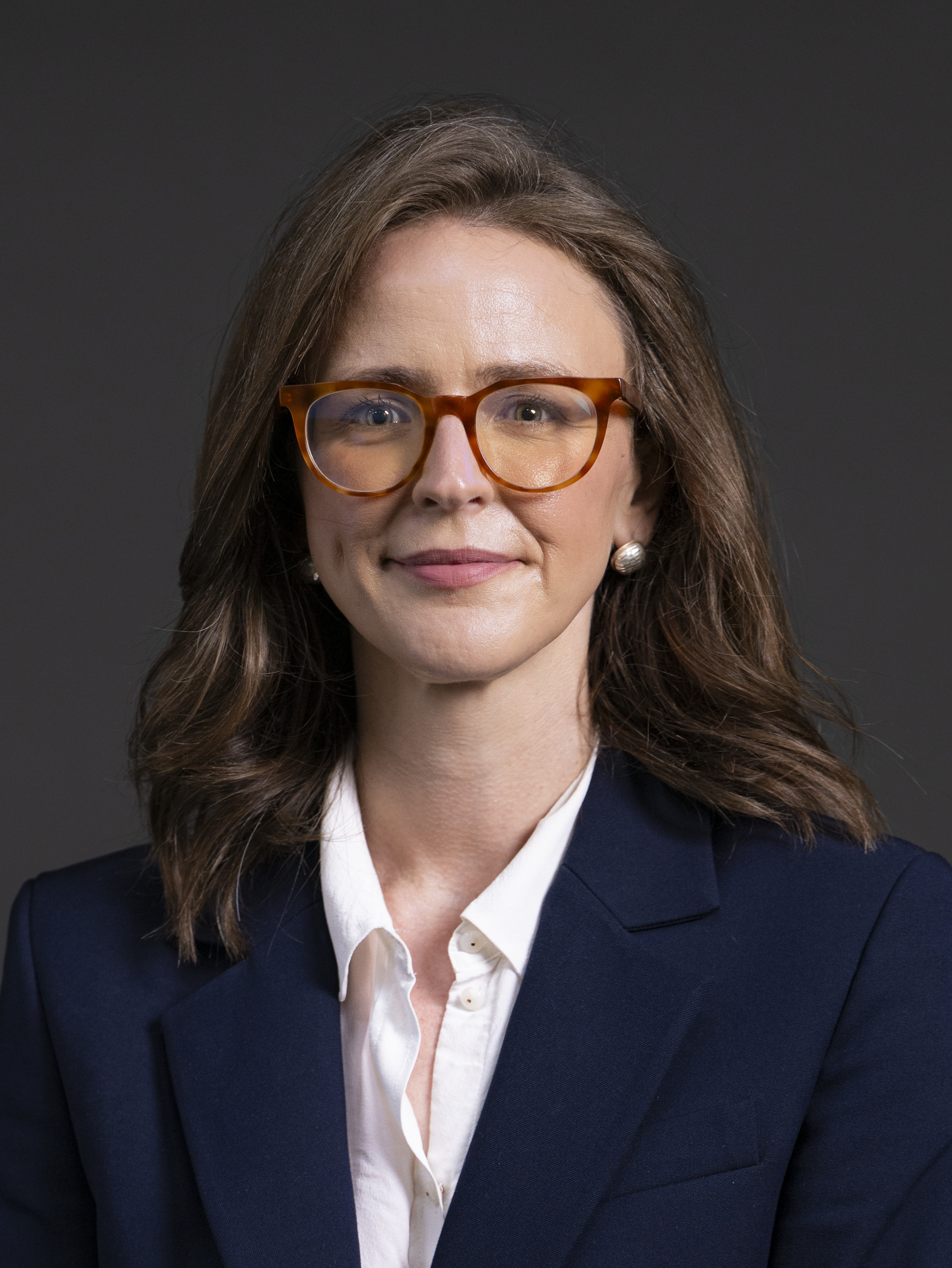
- Official portrait, 2026

Member of Parliament for Rochester and Strood
- Incumbent
- Assumed office 4 July 2024
- Preceded by: Kelly Tolhurst
- Majority: 2,930 (6.9%)

Member of Medway Council for Rochester East and Warren Wood Rochester East (2021–2023)
- In office 16 December 2021 – 16 December 2024
- Preceded by: Nick Bowler
- Succeeded by: David Finch

Personal details
- Born: Lauren Rae Edwards Altona, Victoria, Australia
- Party: Labour
- Education: University of Adelaide (BIntSt); London School of Economics (MSc)

Lauren Rae Edwards is an Australian-born (Note: An exact birth date or year is not publicly recorded in official parliamentary or biographical profiles for Lauren Edwards MP.) British Labour Party politician who has served as the Member of Parliament for Rochester and Strood since 2024.

== Early life and career ==
Edwards was born in Altona, Melbourne, Australia, and was educated at the University of Adelaide before moving to the UK in 2005 to study for a master's at the London School of Economics. Lauren has cited the "hope and optimism" prevalent in the United Kingdom during the early 2000s - characterised by the cultural and political climate shaped by New Labour, Britpop, and the 'Cool Britannia' movement - as a key factor in her decision to relocate to the UK.

Edwards worked as a parliamentary researcher for a number of Labour MPs including Barbara Keeley, Teresa Pearce and Lisa Nandy from 2008 to 2013. During this time she was Political Officer for Unite the Union's Parliamentary Staff Branch. From 2013 to 2016 she worked as a researcher at the postal section of the Communication Workers Union.

Edwards worked for about five years at the Bank of England before her selection as a parliamentary candidate, as a manager in financial regulation including a secondment to HM Treasury for about six months working on Brexit related legislation.

Edwards has an English-born mother and holds British citizenship.

== Political career ==
In 2021, Edwards was elected to Medway Council in a by-election from Rochester East ward. She held the seat at the 2023 Medway Council election, and was appointed cabinet member for economic and social regeneration and inward investment.

In 2024, she defeated incumbent Conservative MP Kelly Tolhurst to gain Rochester and Strood.

On 8 August 2024, Edwards issued an apology on Twitter following the emergence of tweets she wrote between 2009 and 2011 in which she used offensive language, described by The Guardian as a "series of 'racist' tweets", stating it was a "significant error of judgement".

In November 2024, Edwards voted in favour of the Terminally Ill Adults (End of Life) Bill, which proposes to legalise assisted suicide. In a statement following the Third Reading, Edwards said: "I believe this Bill is one of the most important, compassionate, and empowering changes to healthcare we've seen in a generation. I want to be clear: this Bill is about choice. This choice does not replace hospice or palliative care."

Prior to the Second Reading of the Universal Credit and Personal Independence Payment Bill, Edwards signed a reasoned amendment opposing the legislation. She cited concerns over proposed changes to Personal Independence Payment (PIP) eligibility, stating that she could not support the bill in its original form due to the implications for passported benefits such as Carer’s Allowance.

Following the Government's announcement of additional investment to support people into work, and the removal of Clause 5 – which contained the proposed changes to PIP eligibility – Edwards voted in favour of the bill.

Edwards re-introduced the Terminally Ill Adults (End of Life) Bill in July 2026, after the previous version of the bill had not been passed before the end of the previous parliamentary session; this second passage was also unsuccessful, falling at its second reading with a vote of 286 to 270 against, a majority of 16.

== Notes ==
Parliament of the United Kingdom
| Preceded by Kelly Tolhurst | Member of Parliament for Rochester and Strood; 2024–present | Incumbent |
