= 2011 Medway Council election =

2011 UK local government election

← 2007	5 May 2011	2015 →

All 55 seats in the chamber
	First party	Second party	Third party
Party	Conservative	Labour	Liberal Democrats
Seats before	33	10	8
Seats won	35	15	3
Seats after	35	15	3
Seat change	▲2	▲5	▼5
- Map of the results
Previous Council Control before election
{{{before_election}}}
Conservative
Subsequent Council Control
Conservative

The 2011 Medway Council unitary authority election took place on 5 May 2011. The Conservative Party won a majority on the council with 35 Councillors, The Labour Party came second with 15 councillors, and the Liberal Democrats third with 3 councillors. There were 2 independent councillors. There were a total of 55 seats on the council.

== Results summary ==
Medway Council Local Election 2011
Party	Seats	Gains	Losses	Net gain/loss	Seats %	Votes %	Votes	+/−
Conservative	35	4	2	+2	63.64	46.05	80,017	
Labour	15	6	1	+5	27.27	34.46	59,870	
Liberal Democrats	3	0	5	-5	5.45	8.81	15,312	
Independent	2	2	4	-2	3.64	4.43	7,692	
Green	0	0	0	0	N/A	2.04	3,540	
UKIP	0	0	0	0	N/A	1.80	3,121	
English Democrat	0	0	0	0	N/A	1.55	2,690	
TUSC	0	0	0	0	N/A	0.51	888	
BNP	0	0	0	0	N/A	0.09	150	

== Council Composition ==
Prior to the election the composition of the council was:

↓
33	13	8	1
Conservative	Labour	LD	I

After the election the composition of the council was:

↓
35	15	3	2
Conservative	Labour	LD	I

I – Independent

== Ward results ==
=== Chatham Central ===
Chatham Central
Party	Candidate	Votes	%	±%
Labour	Julie Shaw	1,949	21.6	
Labour	Paul Godwin	1,896	21.0	
Labour	Vince Maple	1,857	20.6	
Conservative	Denis Wildey	804	8.9	
Conservative	Nigel Major	775	8.6	
Conservative	Eric Williams	744	8.2	
UKIP	Robin Johnson	314	3.5	
English Democrat	Karen Streatfield	242	2.7	
Liberal Democrats	Keith Burrows	223	2.5	
Liberal Democrats	Mark Biggs	220	2.4	
Majority		1,053	11.4	
Turnout		9,024	30.8	
Labour hold		Swing		
Labour hold		Swing		
Labour hold		Swing		

=== Cuxton and Halling ===
Cuxton and Halling
Party	Candidate	Votes	%	±%
Conservative	Ray Maisey	1,188	63.4	
Labour	Tina Lancley	686	36.6	
Majority		502	26.8	
Turnout		1,874	44.9	
Conservative hold		Swing		

=== Gillingham North ===
Gillingham North
Party	Candidate	Votes	%	±%
Independent	Andy Stamp	1,379	13.3	
Independent	Pat Cooper	1,184	11.4	
Labour	Adam Price	1,156	11.2	
Labour	Naushabah Khan	1,108	10.7	
Labour	Ian Darbyshire	1,104	10.7	
Independent	Dan McDonald	1,038	10.0	
Conservative	Rifat Chishti	746	7.2	
Conservative	Jonpaul Kelly	635	6.1	
Conservative	Kamran Safdar	519	5.0	
Liberal Democrats	Cathy Sutton	317	3.1	
Liberal Democrats	Sidney Kingman	311	3.0	
Liberal Democrats	Garry Harrison	272	2.6	
Independent	Alan Austen	251	2.4	
Green	Doug Goodyer	239	2.3	
TUSC	James Feist	96	1.0	
Majority		48	0.5	
Turnout		10,355	34.3	
Independent gain from Liberal Democrats		Swing		
Independent gain from Liberal Democrats		Swing		
Labour gain from Liberal Democrats		Swing		

=== Gillingham South ===
Gillingham South
Party	Candidate	Votes	%	±%
Liberal Democrats	Geoff Juby	1,097	11.4	
Labour	David Colman	1,080	11.2	
Liberal Democrats	Sheila Kearney	1,028	10.6	
Liberal Democrats	Stephen Kearney	1,002	10.4	
Labour	Sucha Gill	1,001	10.4	
Labour	James Smith	928	9.6	
Conservative	Shirley Griffiths	769	8.0	
Conservative	Jim Hattersley	668	6.9	
Conservative	Atma Sandhu	516	5.3	
Green	Simon Marchant	277	2.9	
UKIP	Stephen Newton	275	2.8	
UKIP	Keith Rudd	227	2.3	
TUSC	Jacqui Berry	206	2.1	
Independent	Gillian Stamp	164	1.7	
BNP	Brian Ravenscroft	150	1.6	
Independent	Dan Hilder	136	1.4	
Independent	Stuart Stamp	130	1.4	
Majority		26	0.2	
Turnout		9,654	33.8	
Liberal Democrats hold		Swing		
Labour gain from Liberal Democrats		Swing		
Liberal Democrats hold		Swing		

=== Hempstead and Wigmore ===
Hempstead and Wigmore
Party	Candidate	Votes	%	±%
Conservative	Diane Chambers	1,805	28.6	
Conservative	Rodney Chambers	1,779	28.1	
Independent	Noel McAllister	603	9.5	
Independent	Rupert Brennan	574	9.1	
Labour	David Crowhurst	486	7.7	
Labour	Matthew Hidson	409	6.5	
UKIP	Gregory Knopp	206	3.3	
Liberal Democrats	Ronnie Williams	156	2.5	
UKIP	John Rose	153	2.4	
Liberal Democrats	Philip Gates	147	2.3	
Majority		1,176	18.6	
Turnout		6,318	51.1	
Conservative hold		Swing		
Conservative hold		Swing		

=== Lordswood and Capstone ===
Lordswood and Capstone
Party	Candidate	Votes	%	±%
Conservative	Alan Jarrett	1,618	32.4	
Conservative	David Wildey	1,446	28.9	
Labour	Stuart Bourne	790	15.8	
Labour	Brian Ashman	712	14.2	
UKIP	Alan Harding	256	5.1	
English Democrat	Phoebe Troy	179	3.6	
Majority		656	13.1	
Turnout		5,001	40.2	
Conservative hold		Swing		
Conservative hold		Swing		

=== Luton and Wayfield ===
Luton and Wayfield
Party	Candidate	Votes	%	±%
Labour	Sam Craven	1,487	17.4	
Labour	Christine Godwin	1,467	17.1	
Labour	Tris Osborne	1,326	15.5	
Conservative	Tashi Bhutia	1,268	14.8	
Conservative	Mike Franklin	1,108	13.0	
Conservative	Gloria Opara	992	11.6	
Green	Dave Arthur	299	3.5	
Liberal Democrats	Chris Hooper	168	2.0	
TUSC	Heather Downs	160	1.9	
Liberal Democrats	Eddie Hooper	141	1.6	
Liberal Democrats	Christopher Sams	136	1.6	
Majority		59	0.7	
Turnout		8,552	34.5	
Labour gain from Independent		Swing		
Labour gain from Independent		Swing		
Labour gain from Conservative		Swing		

=== Peninsula ===
Peninsula
Party	Candidate	Votes	%	±%
Conservative	Phil Filmer	2,557	21.9	
Conservative	Tony Watson	2,307	19.7	
Conservative	Chris Irvine	2,125	18.2	
Labour	John Griffin	975	8.3	
Labour	Debbie Fernandez	898	7.7	
Labour	Simon Wady	879	7.5	
English Democrat	Ron Sands	535	4.6	
English Democrat	Dean Lacey	476	4.1	
Green	Richard Patey	351	3.0	
Liberal Democrats	Tamsyn Green	298	2.6	
Liberal Democrats	Shirley Boosey	282	2.4	
Majority		1,150	9.9	
Turnout		11,683	43.8	
Conservative hold		Swing		
Conservative hold		Swing		
Conservative hold		Swing		

=== Princes Park ===
Princes Park
Party	Candidate	Votes	%	±%
Conservative	Matt Bright	1,488	29.1	
Conservative	Pat Gulvin	1,317	25.8	
Labour	Matthew Butt	1,014	19.9	
Labour	David Albiston	968	19.0	
English Democrat	Daniel Logan	200	3.9	
Liberal Democrats	Mohammad Qureshi	119	2.3	
Majority		303	5.9	
Turnout		5,106	38.9	
Conservative hold		Swing		
Conservative hold		Swing		

=== Rainham Central ===
Rainham Central
Party	Candidate	Votes	%	±%
Conservative	Rehman Chishti	2,931	23.8	
Conservative	Mike O'Brien	2,538	20.6	
Conservative	Barry Kemp	2,514	20.4	
Labour	Christine Murphy	938	7.6	
Labour	Carl Pinnock	917	7.5	
Labour	Roger Bragg	912	7.4	
UKIP	Patricia Medford	412	3.4	
Liberal Democrats	David Yale	308	2.5	
Liberal Democrats	Chrystalla Peck	298	2.4	
Green	Andy Rogers	286	2.3	
Liberal Democrats	Dereck Peck	251	2.1	
Majority		1,576	12.8	
Turnout		12,305	48.5	
Conservative hold		Swing		
Conservative hold		Swing		
Conservative hold		Swing		

=== Rainham North ===
Rainham North
Party	Candidate	Votes	%	±%
Conservative	David Carr	1,553	27.7	
Conservative	Vaughan Hewett	1,475	26.3	
Labour	Harry Keane	620	11.0	
Labour	Mary Keane	593	10.6	
Liberal Democrats	Richard Guichard	534	9.5	
Liberal Democrats	Terry Lucy	439	7.8	
UKIP	Bob Oakley	221	3.9	
UKIP	Danny Dancy	179	3.2	
Majority		855	15.3	
Turnout		5,614	44.6	
Conservative hold		Swing		
Conservative hold		Swing		

=== Rainham South ===
Rainham South
Party	Candidate	Votes	%	±%
Conservative	Howard Doe	1,959	19.6	
Conservative	David Royle	1,901	19.0	
Conservative	Leslie Wicks	1,659	16.6	
Labour	Linda Miller	1,021	10.2	
Labour	Gillian Pearson	997	9.9	
Labour	Jill Fennel	922	9.2	
Liberal Democrats	Nina Chance	443	4.4	
UKIP	Jill Collin	389	3.9	
Liberal Democrats	Terence Harrison	378	3.8	
Liberal Democrats	Ian Sellen	338	3.4	
Majority		638	6.4	
Turnout		10007	38.3	
Conservative hold		Swing		
Conservative hold		Swing		
Conservative hold		Swing		

=== River ===
River
Party	Candidate	Votes	%	±%
Conservative	Craig Mackinlay	1,037	26.8	
Conservative	Andrew Mackness	970	25.0	
Labour	John Jones	846	21.8	
Labour	Adetomi Yemi	612	15.8	
Liberal Democrats	Ernest Gray	119	3.1	
Green	Steven Keevil	115	3.0	
Green	Chris Price	89	2.3	
Liberal Democrats	Nem Juby	85	2.2	
Majority		124	3.2	
Turnout		3,873	36.9	
Conservative hold		Swing		
Conservative gain from Labour		Swing		

=== Rochester East ===
Rochester East
Party	Candidate	Votes	%	±%
Labour	Teresa Murray	1,570	30.7	
Labour	Nick Bowler	1,531	29.9	
Conservative	Brian Griffin	833	16.3	
Conservative	Jim Nugent	649	12.7	
Green	Dave Heritage	255	5.0	
Liberal Democrats	Carol Kemsley	180	3.5	
Liberal Democrats	Guri Singh Rai	98	1.9	
Majority		698	13.6	
Turnout		5,116	38.2	
Labour hold		Swing		
Labour hold		Swing		

=== Rochester South and Horsted ===
Rocheseter South and Horsted
Party	Candidate	Votes	%	±%
Conservative	Trevor Clarke	2,278	20.7	
Conservative	Sylvia Griffin	2,042	18.6	
Conservative	Rupert Turpin	1.760	16.0	
Labour	Hugh Hawkins	1.186	10.8	
Labour	Joe Murray	1,115	10.2	
Labour	Alex Paterson	1,099	10.0	
UKIP	Keith Fletcher	489	4.5	
Liberal Democrats	Viv Parker	459	4.2	
Green	Tony Major	342	3.1	
TUSC	Laura Rumley	214	1.9	
Majority		282	2.6	
Turnout		10,984	43.1	
Conservative gain from Independent		Swing		
Conservative hold		Swing		
Conservative hold		Swing		

=== Rochester West ===
Rochester West
Party	Candidate	Votes	%	±%
Conservative	Ted Baker	1,658	28.1	
Conservative	Kelly Tolhurst	1,336	22.7	
Labour	Sarah Hehir	1,029	17.5	
Labour	Derek Munton	851	14.4	
Green	Trish Marchant	280	4.8	
Liberal Democrats	Ken Juby	246	4.2	
Green	Mary Smith	208	3.5	
Liberal Democrats	Qamar Khan Lodhi	195	3.3	
English Democrat	Agita Sudraba	88	1.5	
Majority		307	5.2	
Turnout		5,891	43.0	
Conservative hold		Swing		
Conservative hold		Swing		

=== Strood North ===
Strood North
Party	Candidate	Votes	%	±%
Conservative	Jane Chitty	2,016	17.4	
Conservative	Jane Etheridge	1,988	17.2	
Labour	Stephen Hubbard	1,764	15.3	
Conservative	Paul Rai	1,699	14.7	
Labour	Linda Robson	1,480	12.8	
Labour	Liam Curran	1,390	12.0	
Liberal Democrats	Andrew Millsom	318	2.7	
English Democrat	Phil Varnham	282	2.4	
Liberal Democrats	Tony Phillips	228	2.0	
TUSC	Chas Berry	212	1.8	
Liberal Democrats	Mike Price	198	1.7	
Majority		65	0.6	
Turnout		11,575	42.1	
Conservative hold		Swing		
Conservative hold		Swing		
Labour hold		Swing		

=== Strood Rural ===
Strood Rural
Party	Candidate	Votes	%	±%
Conservative	Tom Mason	2,106	19.6	
Conservative	Peter Hicks	2,093	19.4	
Conservative	Peter Rodberg	1,795	16.7	
Labour	Kim Murphy	1,036	9.6	
Labour	Eleanor Dhiman	866	8.0	
Labour	Raj Heer	796	7.4	
Independent	Christopher Fribbins	683	6.4	
Green	David Davison	395	3.7	
Liberal Democrats	Colin Elliot	346	3.2	
Liberal Democrats	David Green	334	3.1	
Liberal Democrats	Stephen Boosey	311	2.9	
Majority		759	5.2	
Turnout		10,761	38.4	
Conservative hold		Swing		
Conservative hold		Swing		
Conservative hold		Swing		

=== Strood South ===
Strood South
Party	Candidate	Votes	%	±%
Conservative	John Avey	1,576	16.4	
Labour	Isaac Igwe	1,459	15.2	
Conservative	Josie Iles	1,412	14.7	
Labour	Robert Heathfield	1,395	14.5	
Labour	Mark Jones	1,388	14.4	
Conservative	Ken Bamber	1,332	13.8	
English Democrat	Michael Walters	513	5.3	
Liberal Democrats	Jacqueline Ball	207	2.1	
Liberal Democrats	Thomas Moore	175	1.8	
Liberal Democrats	Christopher Hunt	170	1.8	
Majority		17	0.2	
Turnout		9,627	33.1	
Conservative hold		Swing		
Labour gain from Conservative		Swing		
Conservative hold		Swing		

=== Twydall ===
Twydall
Party	Candidate	Votes	%	±%
Labour	Paul Harriott	1,882	18.1	
Labour	Dorte Gilry	1,807	17.4	
Labour	Glyn Griffiths	1,744	16.8	
Conservative	Diana Lawrence	1,402	13.5	
Conservative	Tony Rocco	1,286	12.4	
Conservative	Arthur Wenham	1,202	11.5	
Liberal Democrats	Brian Gittings	303	2.9	
Green	Tina Lawlor Mottram	275	2.6	
Liberal Democrats	Alan Jefferies	249	2.4	
Liberal Democrats	Mavis Yale	246	2.4	
Majority		342	3.3	
Turnout		10,396	38.7	
Labour hold		Swing		
Labour hold		Swing		
Labour hold		Swing		

=== Walderslade ===
Walderslade
Party	Candidate	Votes	%	±%
Conservative	David Brake	1,280	23.6	
Conservative	Adrian Gulvin	1,019	18.8	
Independent	Ian Burt	964	17.8	
Independent	Kieran Magee	694	12.8	
Labour	John Lloyd	490	9.0	
Labour	James Wyper	441	8.1	
English Democrat	Sean Varnham	175	3.2	
Green	Edith East	129	2.4	
Liberal Democrats	Jasmin Ademovic	121	2.2	
Liberal Democrats	Hilary Drake Brockman	117	2.1	
Majority		55	1.0	
Turnout		5,430	40.5	
Conservative hold		Swing		
Conservative gain from Independent		Swing		

=== Watling ===
Watling
Party	Candidate	Votes	%	±%
Liberal Democrats	Diana Smith	950	21.7	
Conservative	Wendy Purdy	780	17.8	
Conservative	Phillip Manning	764	17.4	
Liberal Democrats	Tony Jeacock	751	17.1	
Labour	Ian Cuthbert	560	12.8	
Labour	David Walker	437	10.0	
Independent	Barry Archer	143	3.2	
Majority		342	3.3	
Turnout		4,385	44.2	
Liberal Democrats hold		Swing		
Conservative gain from Liberal Democrats		Swing		
