= 2019 Medway Council election =

2019 UK local government election

- 2 May 2019

All 55 seats to Medway Council 28 seats needed for a majority
	Con	Lab
Leader	Alan Jarrett	Vince Maple
Party	Conservative	Labour
Leader's seat	Lordswood and Capstone	Chatham; Central
Last election	36 seats, 42.9%	15 seats, 27.9%
Current seats	34	15
- Map of results of 2019 election
Incumbent Leader of the Council
Alan Jarrett
Conservative

Elections to Medway Council were held on 2 May 2019 as part of the 2019 United Kingdom local elections. The elections were for all 55 councillors across 22 wards.

== Result ==
2019 Medway Council election
Party	Candidates	Seats	Gains	Losses	Net gain/loss	Seats %	Votes %	Votes	+/−
Conservative	55	33	1	4	▼3	60.0	40.0	56,677	–2.9
Labour	55	20	4	0	▲4	36.4	33.1	46,879	+5.2
Independent	25	2	2	0	▲2	3.6	9.2	13,082	+8.6
UKIP	23	0	0	3	▼3	0.0	8.6	12,137	–13.2
Green	16	0	0	0	Steady	0.0	4.4	6,304	+2.1
Liberal Democrats	22	0	0	0	Steady	0.0	4.2	6,012	+1.0
CPA	2	0	0	0	Steady	0.0	0.3	364	N/A
Animal Welfare	1	0	0	0	Steady	0.0	0.2	229	N/A

== Council Composition ==
Prior to the election, the composition of the council was:

↓
34	15	4	1	1
Conservative	Labour	I	UKIP	Vacant

After the election, the composition of the council was:

↓
33	20	2
Conservative	Labour	I

== Ward results ==
The results for each ward were as follows. Asterisks denote incumbent Councillors seeking re-election. A total of 199 candidates stood for the 55 seats available.

=== Chatham Central ===
Chatham Central
Party	Candidate	Votes	%	±%
Labour	Vince Maple*	1,577	56.9	
Labour	Harinder Mahil	1,343	48.5	
Labour	Siju Adeoye	1,258	45.4	
UKIP	Nicole Bushill	520	18.8	
Conservative	David Jarrett	508	18.3	
Conservative	Pat Gulvin	503	18.2	
Independent	Peter Jenkins	439	15.8	
Conservative	Denise Wildey	435	15.7	
Independent	Lisa Frimston	415	15.0	
CPA	John Gibson	166	6.0	
Turnout		2,796	25.8	
Rejected ballots		25	0.9	
Registered electors		10,848		
Labour hold		Swing		
Labour hold		Swing		
Labour hold		Swing		

=== Cuxton and Halling ===
Cuxton and Halling
Party	Candidate	Votes	%	±%
Conservative	Matt Fearn*	911	52.1	
Independent	Jacqueline Cook	239	13.7	
Labour	Katherine Porter	230	13.2	
UKIP	Naomi Wilson	191	10.9	
Green	Tina Munro	178	10.2	
Turnout		1,755	34.7	
Rejected ballots		6	0.3	
Registered electors		5,054		
Conservative hold		Swing		

=== Gillingham North ===
Gillingham North
Party	Candidate	Votes	%	±%
Labour	Andy Stamp*	1,896	59.0	
Labour	Pat Cooper*	1,854	57.7	
Labour	Adam Price*	1,702	53.0	
UKIP	Robert Oakley	613	19.1	
Conservative	Faisal Ahmed	497	15.5	
Conservative	Kwashie Anang	485	15.1	
Conservative	Cartell Cheema	462	14.4	
Green	George Salomon	383	11.9	
Liberal Democrats	Sid Kingman	221	6.9	
Liberal Democrats	Ian Richard	180	5.6	
Liberal Democrats	Chris Sams	152	4.7	
Turnout		3,220	27.3	
Rejected ballots		7	0.2	
Registered electors		11,794		
Labour hold		Swing		
Labour hold		Swing		
Labour hold		Swing		

=== Gillingham South ===
Gillingham South
Party	Candidate	Votes	%	±%
Labour	Naushabah Khan*	1,670	51.7	
Labour	Clive Johnson*	1,666	51.6	
Labour	Dan McDonald*	1,653	51.2	
UKIP	Terry Allen	655	20.3	
Conservative	Heidi Folk	557	17.2	
Conservative	Les Wicks	553	17.1	
Conservative	Harbans Sidhu	502	15.5	
Liberal Democrats	Alan Jefferies	398	12.3	
Liberal Democrats	Geoff Juby	387	12.0	
Liberal Democrats	Nemia Juby	324	10.0	
Turnout		3,248	29.2	
Rejected ballots		17	0.5	
Registered electors		11,127		
Labour hold		Swing		
Labour hold		Swing		
Labour hold		Swing		

Les Wicks was elected as a Conservative councillor in Rainham South in 2015.

=== Hempstead and Wigmore ===
Hempstead and Wigmore
Party	Candidate	Votes	%	±%
Conservative	Diane Chambers*	1,641	68.3	
Conservative	Rodney Chambers*	1,613	67.2	
UKIP	Raymond Eldridge	325	13.5	
Liberal Democrats	Terry Lucy	240	10.0	
Labour	Louwella Prenter	233	9.7	
Labour	Nabilah Khan	228	9.5	
Liberal Democrats	Veronica Williams	224	9.3	
Turnout		2,420	37.2	
Rejected ballots		18	0.7	
Registered electors		6,499		
Conservative hold		Swing		
Conservative hold		Swing		

=== Lordswood and Capstone ===
Lordswood and Capstone
Party	Candidate	Votes	%	±%
Conservative	Alan Jarrett*	1,357	68.7	
Conservative	David Wildey*	1,189	60.2	
UKIP	Jonathan Phillips	476	24.1	
Labour	John Strevens	262	13.3	
Green	Simon Marchant	258	13.1	
Labour	Funmi Ayeni	248	12.6	
Turnout		1,984	28.8	
Rejected ballots		8	0.4	
Registered electors		6,885		
Conservative hold		Swing		
Conservative hold		Swing		

=== Luton and Wayfield ===
Luton and Wayfield
Party	Candidate	Votes	%	±%
Labour	Tristan Osborne*	1,045	39.0	
Labour	Joanne Howcroft-Scott	1,009	37.7	
Labour	Simon Curry	1,005	37.5	
Conservative	Robbie Lammas	730	27.2	
Conservative	Alex McDermott	693	25.9	
UKIP	Keith Fletcher	662	24.7	
Conservative	Ade Kosoko	647	24.2	
Independent	Sam Craven*	556	20.8	
Independent	Mike Franklin*	415	15.5	
Liberal Democrats	Paul O'Neill	205	7.7	
Turnout		2,693	27.1	
Rejected ballots		14	0.5	
Registered electors		9,949		
Labour gain from Conservative		Swing		
Labour hold		Swing		
Labour hold		Swing		

Sam Craven was elected as a Labour councillor in 2015. Mike Franklin was elected as a Conservative councillor in 2015.

=== Peninsula ===
Peninsula
Party	Candidate	Votes	%	±%
Independent	Ron Sands	1,413	36.5	
Conservative	Phil Filmer*	1,157	29.9	
Independent	Mick Pendergast*	1,125	29.1	
UKIP	Roy Freshwater*	1002	25.9	
Conservative	Gloria Thienel	834	21.5	
Conservative	Harold Ogunfemi	792	20.5	
Independent	Julie Wallace	734	19.0	
Independent	Chris Spalding	512	13.2	
Labour	Elizabeth Castell	449	11.6	
Green	Sonia Hyner	446	11.5	
Green	Clive Gregory	442	11.4	
Labour	Joe Murray	399	10.3	
Green	Mohammad Ahmad	371	9.6	
Labour	Simon Williams	298	7.7	
Turnout		3,895	34.1	
Rejected ballots		23	0.6	
Registered electors		11,433		
Independent gain from UKIP		Swing		
Independent gain from UKIP		Swing		
Conservative hold		Swing		

Mick Pendergast was elected as a UKIP councillor in 2015.

=== Princes Park ===
Princes Park
Party	Candidate	Votes	%	±%
Conservative	Tashi Bhutia*	962	48.3	
Conservative	Gloria Opara*	951	47.7	
Labour	Rav Jassal	554	27.8	
UKIP	Nicholas Chambers	497	24.9	
Labour	Olu Obadare	494	24.8	
Turnout		2,003	26.5	
Rejected ballots		11	0.5	
Registered electors		7,555		
Conservative hold		Swing		
Conservative hold		Swing		

=== Rainham Central ===
Rainham Central
Party	Candidate	Votes	%	±%
Conservative	Jan Aldous*	1,699	46.1	
Conservative	Barry Kemp*	1,696	46.0	
Conservative	Nusrat Ahmed	1,439	39.0	
Independent	Matt Durcan	929	25.2	
Independent	Mark Mencattelli	670	18.2	
UKIP	David Baylis	585	15.9	
Green	Mary Smith	575	15.6	
Labour	Sajjad Khan	475	12.9	
Labour	Smitha Campbell	468	12.7	
Labour	Robert Taylor	460	12.5	
Independent	Shanthi Ravikumar	365	9.9	
Independent	Charlie Sheregill	279	7.6	
Turnout		3,698	37.6	
Rejected ballots		11	0.3	
Registered electors		9,826		
Conservative hold		Swing		
Conservative hold		Swing		
Conservative hold		Swing		

=== Rainham North ===
Rainham North
Party	Candidate	Votes	%	±%
Conservative	Martin Potter*	1,633	64.5	
Conservative	Kirstine Carr	1,580	62.4	
Labour	Chiron Mottram	565	22.3	
Labour	Benjamin Pranczke	517	20.4	
UKIP	David Platt	352	13.9	
Turnout		2,552	36.7	
Rejected ballots		20	0.8	
Registered electors		6,955		
Conservative hold		Swing		
Conservative hold		Swing		

=== Rainham South ===
Rainham South
Party	Candidate	Votes	%	±%
Conservative	Gary Hackwell	1,565	50.5	
Conservative	Howard Doe*	1,527	49.3	
Conservative	Roger Barrett	1,388	44.8	
UKIP	Jean Appleton	682	22.0	
Labour	Alexandra Chatfield	610	19.7	
Labour	David Carman	601	19.4	
Independent	Tom Davis	559	18.0	
Labour	Eddie Peake	496	16.0	
Liberal Democrats	Mike Walters	312	10.1	
CPA	Roger Peacock	198	6.4	
Turnout		3,110	30.7	
Rejected ballots		11	0.4	
Registered electors		10,127		
Conservative hold		Swing		
Conservative hold		Swing		
Conservative hold		Swing		

=== River ===
River
Party	Candidate	Votes	%	±%
Conservative	Piers Thompson	780	37.4	
Conservative	Habib Tejan*	742	35.6	
Labour	Lia Mandaracas	677	32.5	
Labour	Tony Scudder	622	29.8	
UKIP	Leon Simmonds	337	16.2	
Green	Caroline Bowes	300	14.4	
Liberal Democrats	John Castle	207	9.9	
Liberal Democrats	Alan Wells	172	8.2	
Turnout		2,102	31.4	
Rejected ballots		17	0.8	
Registered electors		6,697		
Conservative hold		Swing		
Conservative hold		Swing		

=== Rochester East ===
Rochester East
Party	Candidate	Votes	%	±%
Labour	Teresa Murray*	1,332	55.0	
Labour	Nick Bowler*	1,277	52.7	
Conservative	Teresa Fawcett	542	22.4	
Conservative	Jon Jones	414	17.1	
Green	Marilyn Stone	393	16.2	
UKIP	Scott Harris	329	13.6	
Liberal Democrats	Adrian Brindley	174	7.2	
Turnout		2,432	32.2	
Rejected ballots		8	0.3	
Registered electors		7,553		
Labour hold		Swing		
Labour hold		Swing		

=== Rochester South and Horsted ===
Rochester South and Horsted
Party	Candidate	Votes	%	±%
Conservative	Trevor Clarke*	1,658	49.0	
Conservative	Sylvia Griffin*	1,563	46.2	
Conservative	Rupert Turpin*	1,498	44.3	
Labour	Joe Wastell	816	24.1	
Labour	Mark Jones	767	22.7	
Labour	Meenatchi Gopal	766	22.6	
UKIP	Rose Atkinson	566	16.7	
Green	Bernard Hyde	427	12.6	
Liberal Democrats	Viv Parker	365	10.8	
Liberal Democrats	Sarah Manuel	342	10.1	
Liberal Democrats	Cathy Sutton	277	8.2	
Turnout		3,412	33.2	
Rejected ballots		28	0.8	
Registered electors		10,276		
Conservative hold		Swing		
Conservative hold		Swing		
Conservative hold		Swing		

=== Rochester West ===
Rochester West
Party	Candidate	Votes	%	±%
Conservative	Stuart Tranter*	1,248	42.0	
Labour	Alex Paterson*	1,126	37.9	
Conservative	Rebecca Ryan	1,017	34.2	
Labour	Elaine Thomas	775	26.1	
Green	Catriona Jamieson	431	14.5	
UKIP	Robert Newton	335	11.3	
Liberal Democrats	Anita Holloway	244	8.2	
Animal Welfare	Mina Da Rui	229	7.7	
Liberal Democrats	Peter Loftus	166	5.6	
Turnout		2,980	39.1	
Rejected ballots		9	0.3	
Registered electors		7,618		
Conservative hold		Swing		
Labour hold		Swing		

=== Strood North ===
Strood North
Party	Candidate	Votes	%	±%
Conservative	Elizabeth Chitty*	1,331	38.3	
Labour	Stephen Hubbard	1,313	37.8	
Conservative	Steve Iles*	1,200	34.6	
Labour	James Braithwaite	1,118	32.2	
Conservative	Fatima Mitchell	1,055	30.4	
Labour	Zöe Van Dyke	1,037	29.9	
UKIP	David Atkinson	604	17.4	
Green	Trish Marchant	499	14.4	
Independent	Chembukkavu George	410	11.8	
Independent	Les Nithsdale	349	10.1	
Independent	Kevin Nutter	264	7.6	
Turnout		3,480	33.6	
Rejected ballots		9	0.3	
Registered electors		10,342		
Labour gain from Conservative		Swing		
Conservative hold		Swing		
Conservative hold		Swing		

=== Strood Rural ===
Strood Rural
Party	Candidate	Votes	%	±%
Conservative	John Williams*	1,407	41.5	
Conservative	Gary Etheridge*	1,331	39.2	
Conservative	Elizabeth Turpin	1,232	36.3	
UKIP	Martin Cook	770	22.7	
Independent	Ben Cook	724	21.3	
Labour	Julia Hawkins	588	17.3	
Independent	Brian Styles	538	15.9	
Labour	Charlie Kennedy	520	15.3	
Green	Ken Watkins	501	14.8	
Independent	Frank Moreton	491	14.5	
Labour	Gareth Myton	467	13.8	
Liberal Democrats	Andy Millsom	350	10.3	
Turnout		3,404	29.7	
Rejected ballots		12	0.4	
Registered electors		11,464		
Conservative hold		Swing		
Conservative hold		Swing		
Conservative hold		Swing		

=== Strood South ===
Strood South
Party	Candidate	Votes	%	±%
Conservative	Josie Iles*	938	34.4	
Conservative	Chris Buckwell	861	31.6	
Conservative	Richard Thorne	777	28.5	
Labour	Lindsey Burke	758	27.8	
Labour	Isaac Igwe	758	27.8	
Labour	Anthony Hill	755	27.7	
UKIP	Shane Back	611	22.4	
UKIP	David Fahey	549	20.1	
Green	Marja Kingma	384	14.1	
Independent	Neil Atkinson	382	14.0	
Independent	Steve McManus	269	9.9	
Independent	Alan Tucker	216	7.9	
Turnout		2,735	24.4	
Rejected ballots		8	0.3	
Registered electors		11,206		
Conservative gain from UKIP		Swing		
Conservative hold		Swing		
Conservative hold		Swing		

=== Twydall ===
Twydall
Party	Candidate	Votes	%	±%
Labour	John Lloyd	1,190	39.2	
Labour	Hazel Browne-Williams	1,139	37.6	
Labour	Mark Prenter	1,066	35.2	
Conservative	Natalie Jarvis	893	29.5	
Conservative	Jim Gilbourne	844	27.8	
Conservative	Mark Joy	819	27.0	
UKIP	Rob McCulloch Martin	645	21.3	
Independent	Christine Barnacle	489	16.1	
Green	Kate Belmonte	420	13.9	
Independent	Leona McCord	300	9.9	
Liberal Democrats	Maureen Ruparel	235	7.8	
Turnout		3,045	30.3	
Rejected ballots		13	0.4	
Registered electors		10,064		
Labour gain from Conservative		Swing		
Labour hold		Swing		
Labour hold		Swing		

Mark Joy was elected as a UKIP councillor in Strood South in 2015.

=== Walderslade ===
Walderslade
Party	Candidate	Votes	%	±%
Conservative	David Brake*	1,241	58.2	
Conservative	Adrian Gulvin*	1,091	51.1	
Labour	Jonathan Brind	551	25.8	
Labour	Robert Heathfield	500	23.4	
UKIP	Stephen Newton	460	21.6	
Turnout		2,156	29.8	
Rejected ballots		22	1.0	
Registered electors		7,241		
Conservative hold		Swing		
Conservative hold		Swing		

=== Watling ===
Watling
Party	Candidate	Votes	%	±%
Conservative	Wendy Purdy*	949	35.5	
Labour	Chrissy Stamp	928	34.7	
Labour	Jordan Hartley	768	28.7	
Conservative	Andrew Lawrence	740	27.6	
Liberal Democrats	Alan Collins	473	17.7	
UKIP	David Radlett	371	13.9	
Liberal Democrats	Martin Rose	364	13.6	
Green	Joel Love	296	11.1	
Turnout		2,692	37.5	
Rejected ballots		15	0.6	
Registered electors		7,176		
Labour gain from Conservative		Swing		
Conservative hold		Swing		

== Changes 2019–2023 ==
- Siju Adeoye (Chatham Central), elected as a Labour councillor, joined the Conservative Group after the December 2022 Peninsula by-election.
- George Crozer, who won that by-election as an independent, and Ron Sands established an Independent Group on the council.

=== By-elections ===
==== Princes Park ====
A by-election was held on 26 August 2021 after the death of Conservative councillor Tashi Bhutia. The Conservatives held the seat.

Princes Park: 26 August 2021
Party	Candidate	Votes	%	±%
Conservative	Robbie Lammas	961	67.4	+19.6
Labour	John Strevens	313	21.9	−5.6
Green	Sonia Hyner	52	3.6	N/A
Independent	Matt Durcan	51	3.6	N/A
Liberal Democrats	John Castle	49	3.4	N/A
Majority		648	45.4	
Turnout		1,432	18.8	
Rejected ballots		6	0.4	
Registered electors		7,609		
Conservative hold		Swing	▲12.6	

==== Strood North ====
A by-election was held on 26 August 2021 after the death of Conservative councillor Steve Iles. Labour gained the seat from the Conservatives.

Strood North: 26 August 2021
Party	Candidate	Votes	%	±%
Labour Co-op	Zöe Van Dyke	913	37.1	+5.5
Conservative	Mark Joy	728	29.5	−2.4
Green	Cat Jamieson	565	23.0	+11.0
Independent	Chris Spalding	216	8.8	N/A
Liberal Democrats	Alan Wells	39	1.6	N/A
Majority		185	7.6	
Turnout		2,466	23.5	
Rejected ballots		5	0.2	
Registered electors		10,477		
Labour gain from Conservative		Swing	▲4.0	

==== Rochester East ====
A by-election was held on 16 December 2021 after the death of Labour councillor Nick Bowler. Labour held the seat.

Rochester East: 16 December 2021
Party	Candidate	Votes	%	±%
Labour	Lauren Edwards	870	63.3	+15.2
Conservative	Brian Griffin	388	28.2	+8.7
Green	Bernard Hyde	69	5.0	−9.2
Liberal Democrats	Sarah Manuel	48	3.5	−2.8
Majority		482	35.1	
Turnout		1,380	18.2	
Rejected ballots		5	0.4	
Registered electors		7,597		
Labour hold		Swing	▲3.3	

==== Peninsula ====
A by-election was held on 8 December 2022 after the death of independent councillor Mick Pendergast. An independent held the seat.

Peninsula: 8 December 2022
Party	Candidate	Votes	%	±%
Independent	George Crozer	1,038	46.6	N/A
Conservative	Harold Ogunfemi	371	16.7	–6.5
Green	Julian Sutton	255	11.5	+2.5
Independent	Chris Spalding	230	10.3	±0.0
Labour	David Hodges	215	9.7	+0.7
Independent	Sharon Jackson	89	4.0	N/A
Liberal Democrats	Ben Rist	29	1.3	N/A
Majority		667	29.9	
Turnout		2,228	18.7	
Rejected ballots		1	0.0	
Registered electors		11,914		
Independent hold		Swing		
