= Dayantha Liyanage =

Dayantha "Dai" Liyanage, MBE, FMS, MCMI is a Sri Lankan born British politician and a management consultant. He is a former Mayor of Medway in Medway, Kent.

Educated at Royal College Colombo and at Brunel University, Liyanage started his career as a trainee Work Study Engineer in an engineering company in Kent after which he joined GLC as a Work Study Officer in 1970 and went on to work for the British Shoe Corporation. He spent three and a half years in Zambia for a copper mining company. Returning the Britain in 1980 Liyanage worked for the Westminster City Council and the London borough of Tower Hamlets until his early retirement. Currently he is working for the National Criminal Intelligence Service.
