= 2023 Medway Council election =

2023 English local election

- 4 May 2023

All 59 seats to Medway Council 30 seats needed for a majority

	First party	Second party	Third party
Leader	Vince Maple	Alan Jarrett	George Crozer
Party	Labour Co-op	Conservative	Independent
Last election	20 seats, 33.2%	33 seats, 40.1%	2 seats, 9.3%
Seats won	33	22	4
Seat change	▲13	▼11	▲2
Popular vote	63,062	53,841	7,921
Percentage	45.0%	38.4%	5.6%
Swing	▲11.9%	▼1.6%	▼3.6%
- Winner of each seat at the 2023 Medway Council election
Leader before election
Alan Jarrett
Conservative
Leader after election
Vince Maple
Labour Co-op

The 2023 Medway Council election took place on 4 May 2023 to elect members of Medway Council in Kent, England. This election was held on the same day as other local elections. The Labour Party won control of the council for the first time since its creation in 1998 under the Labour Co-op banner, winning 11 seats while the incumbent Conservative Party lost 13 seats. This was the first time a council in Britain elected a full Labour Co-op slate and therefore the first council run by the Co-operative Party as well as Labour.

After the previous election, there were boundary changes that increased the number of councillors from 55 to 59 and the number of wards from 22 to 24. This was the first Medway Council election fought under these new boundaries.

== Summary ==
Prior to the election the council was under Conservative majority control, led by Alan Jarrett. He chose not to stand for re-election.

The election saw Labour take a majority of the seats on the council for the first time since its creation in 1998 under the Labour Co-op banner. The Labour Co-op group leader, Vince Maple, was formally appointed as leader of the council at the subsequent annual council meeting on 24 May 2023. This was the first time a council in Britain elected a full Labour Co-op slate and therefore the first council run by the Co-operative Party as well as Labour, though some unelected Labour candidates did not run with the Co-operative Party.

=== Election result ===
2023 Medway Council election
Party	Candidates	Seats	Gains	Losses	Net gain/loss	Seats %	Votes %	Votes	+/−
Labour	59	33	1	0	▲13	55.9	45.0	63,062	+11.9
Conservative	59	22	0	1	▼11	37.3	38.4	53,841	–1.6
Independent	8	4	0	0	▲2	6.8	5.6	7,921	–3.6
Green	25	0	0	0	Steady	0.0	5.5	7,741	+1.1
Liberal Democrats	28	0	0	0	Steady	0.0	5.0	6,978	+0.8
Heritage	1	0	0	0	Steady	0.0	0.2	217	N/A
CPA	2	0	0	0	Steady	0.0	0.1	208	–0.2
Reform	2	0	0	0	Steady	0.0	0.1	143	N/A
SDP	2	0	0	0	Steady	0.0	0.1	132	N/A

== Ward results ==
The Statement of Persons Nominated, which details the candidates standing in each ward, was released by Medway Council following the close of nominations on 5 April 2023. The results of the election in each ward were as follows:

=== All Saints ===
All Saints
Party	Candidate	Votes	%
Independent	Chris Spalding	295	30.7
Independent	Julie Wallace	252	26.3
Conservative	Harold Ogunfemi	190	19.8
Labour	Kier Kemp	118	12.3
Reform	Bill Khatkar	49	5.1
Green	Bernard Hyde	34	3.5
Liberal Democrats	Elizabeth Simpson	22	2.3
Majority		43	4.4
Turnout		965	27.6
Rejected ballots		5	0.5
Registered electors		3,495	
Independent win (new seat)			

=== Chatham Central and Brompton ===
Chatham Central and Brompton (3 seats)
Party	Candidate	Votes	%
Labour Co-op	Vince Maple*	1,394	63.9
Labour Co-op	Nina Gurung	1,211	55.0
Labour Co-op	Damola Animashaun	1,136	51.6
Conservative	Paul Khera	552	25.3
Conservative	Claude King	517	23.5
Conservative	Habib Tejan Jr	467	21.2
Green	Rob O'Hanlon	336	15.3
Liberal Democrats	Geoff Juby	295	13.4
Turnout		2,201	20.9
Rejected ballots		21	1.0
Registered electors		10,525	
Labour Co-op win (new seat)			
Labour Co-op win (new seat)			
Labour Co-op win (new seat)			

=== Cuxton, Halling and Riverside ===
Cuxton, Halling and Riverside (2 seats)
Party	Candidate	Votes	%
Conservative	Matt Fearn*	880	46.8
Conservative	Phil Filmer*	685	36.1
Green	Matt Nightingale	641	33.8
Green	Cat Jamieson	502	26.5
Labour	Stephen McCormack	414	21.8
Labour	Victoria Morris	408	21.5
Liberal Democrats	Ron Gillett	76	4.0
Turnout		1,895	30.9
Rejected ballots		16	0.8
Registered electors		6,129	
Conservative win (new seat)			
Conservative win (new seat)			

=== Fort Horsted ===
Fort Horsted
Party	Candidate	Votes	%
Conservative	Trevor Clarke*	489	45.2
Liberal Democrats	Viv Parker	344	31.8
Labour	Joseph Murray	212	19.6
Green	Matthew Knott	37	3.4
Majority		145	13.4
Turnout		1,090	30.9
Rejected ballots		8	0.7
Registered electors		3,530	
Conservative win (new seat)			

=== Fort Pitt ===
Fort Pitt (3 seats)
Party	Candidate	Votes	%
Labour Co-op	Smitha Campbell	1,726	56.2
Labour Co-op	Harinder Mahil*	1,634	52.8
Labour Co-op	Gareth Myton	1,577	51.0
Conservative	Rupert Turpin*	1,028	33.2
Conservative	Richard Thorne*	951	30.9
Conservative	Gloria Opara*	901	29.3
Green	Karen Scott	527	17.0
Liberal Democrats	Nirmal Sandhu	249	8.0
Turnout		3,094	33.7
Rejected ballots		21	0.7
Registered electors		9,170	
Labour Co-op win (new seat)			
Labour Co-op win (new seat)			
Labour Co-op win (new seat)			

=== Gillingham North ===
Gillingham North (3 seats)
Party	Candidate	Votes	%	±%
Labour Co-op	Adam Price*	1,419	64.5	+10.7
Labour Co-op	Douglas Hamandishe	1,355	60.8	+1.8
Labour Co-op	Lia Mandaracas	1,339	60.1	+2.4
Conservative	Clayton Barrett	530	24.1	+8.3
Conservative	Zarina Chishti	439	19.7	+4.6
Conservative	Harbans Sidhu	410	18.4	+4.0
Green	Jeremy Spyby-Steanson	340	15.3	+3.4
Liberal Democrats	Ben Rist	254	11.4	+4.5
Turnout		2,227	21.8	
Rejected ballots		27	1.2	
Registered electors		10,237		
Labour Co-op hold				
Labour Co-op hold				
Labour Co-op hold				

=== Gillingham South ===
Gillingham South (3 seats)
Party	Candidate	Votes	%	±%
Labour Co-op	Dan McDonald*	1,617	67.0	+14.1
Labour Co-op	Naushabah Khan*	1,531	61.8	+10.1
Labour Co-op	Louwella Prenter	1,491	60.2	+8.6
Conservative	Amy Smith	509	19.0	+1.9
Conservative	Siju Adeoye*	471	19.5	+1.9
Green	Daniel Belmonte	373	15.1	N/A
Conservative	George Georghiou	373	15.1	–0.4
Liberal Democrats	Christopher Sams	322	13.0	+0.7
Turnout		2,478	22.4	
Rejected ballots		63	2.5	
Registered electors		11,085		
Labour Co-op hold				
Labour Co-op hold				
Labour Co-op hold				

=== Hempstead and Wigmore ===
Hempstead and Wigmore (2 seats)
Party	Candidate	Votes	%	±%
Conservative	Jim Gilbourne	1,709	65.6	–3.1
Conservative	Andrew Lawrence	1,617	61.7	–5.5
Labour	Lewis Bailey	603	23.0	+13.3
Labour	Haroon Kahn	450	17.2	+7.7
Green	Kat Korff	237	9.0	N/A
Liberal Democrats	Daniel Cavaliere	222	8.5	–1.5
SDP	Peter Wheeler	58	2.2	N/A
CPA	John Gibson	50	1.9	N/A
Turnout		2,620	35.1	
Rejected ballots		16	0.6	
Registered electors		7,463		
Conservative hold				
Conservative hold				

=== Hoo St Werburgh and High Halstow ===
Hoo St Werburgh and High Halstow (3 seats)
Party	Candidate	Votes	%
Independent	George Crozer*	2,388	71.5
Independent	Ron Sands*	2,279	68.1
Independent	Michael Pearce	2,230	66.6
Conservative	Robert Tildesley	465	13.9
Conservative	Chris Sparks	427	12.8
Conservative	Fatima Mitchell	409	12.2
Labour	Gary Barwell	358	10.7
Labour	Giuliana Christmas	336	10.0
Labour	Steve Vickery	286	8.5
Green	Julian Sutton	140	4.2
Reform	Steve Hudson	94	2.8
Liberal Democrats	Aaron Sergejenkovs-Telford	51	1.5
Turnout		3,349	33.3
Rejected ballots		9	0.3
Registered electors		10,049	
Independent win (new seat)			
Independent win (new seat)			
Independent win (new seat)			

=== Lordswood and Walderslade ===
Lordswood and Walderslade (3 seats)
Party	Candidate	Votes	%
Conservative	David Brake*	1,752	58.5
Conservative	David Wildey*	1,728	51.6
Conservative	Adrian Gulvin*	1,618	48.3
Labour	Christine Godwin	917	27.4
Labour	David Bowen	817	24.4
Labour	Brad Cook	777	23.2
Green	Sonia Hyner	339	10.1
Liberal Democrats	Matthew Vincent	272	8.1
Turnout		2,994	27.6
Rejected ballots		0	0.0
Registered electors		10,857	
Conservative win (new seat)			
Conservative win (new seat)			
Conservative win (new seat)			

=== Luton ===
Luton (2 seats)
Party	Candidate	Votes	%
Labour Co-op	Simon Curry*	796	52.3
Labour Co-op	Jo Howcroft-Scott*	751	48.9
Conservative	Lulu Lammas	541	35.2
Conservative	Mos Igani	510	33.5
Green	Debbie Sutton	174	11.3
Liberal Democrats	Paul O'Neill	136	8.9
Turnout		1,536	22.4
Rejected ballots		14	0.9
Registered electors		6,871	
Labour Co-op win (new seat)			
Labour Co-op win (new seat)			

=== Princes Park ===
Princes Park (2 seats)
Party	Candidate	Votes	%	±%
Conservative	Robbie Lammas*	938	57.9	+9.6
Conservative	Alex Hyne	933	57.6	+9.9
Labour	John Strevens	486	30.0	+2.2
Labour	Temi Olodo	425	26.2	+1.4
Green	Simon Marchant	156	9.6	N/A
Liberal Democrats	Ian Sailes	116	7.6	N/A
Turnout		1,621	24.4	
Rejected ballots		0	0.0	
Registered electors		6,645		
Conservative hold				
Conservative hold				

=== Rainham North ===
Rainham North (3 seats)
Party	Candidate	Votes	%	±%
Conservative	George Perfect	1,210	40.7	–7.6
Conservative	Wayne Spring	1,138	38.3	–9.4
Conservative	Kwashie Anang	1,124	37.8	N/A
Labour	Mark Harrison	1,025	34.5	+6.7
Labour	Nikita Morris	946	31.8	+7.0
Labour	Mutz Khan	907	30.5	N/A
Liberal Democrats	Stuart Bourne	675	22.7	N/A
Green	Trish Marchant	442	14.9	N/A
Liberal Democrats	Alan Collins Rosell	402	13.5	N/A
Liberal Democrats	Nicholas Chan	323	10.9	N/A
Turnout		2,971	28.7	
Rejected ballots		0	0.0	
Registered electors		10,341		
Conservative hold				
Conservative hold				
Conservative win (new seat)				

=== Rainham South East ===
Rainham South East (3 seats)
Party	Candidate	Votes	%
Conservative	Roger Barrett*	1,455	51.4
Conservative	Howard Doe*	1,448	51.0
Conservative	Gary Hackwell*	1,430	50.3
Labour	Katrina Campbell	920	32.4
Labour	Iain Childs	835	29.4
Labour	Chiron Mottram	759	26.7
Green	Mary Smith	431	15.2
Liberal Democrats	Christopher Moore	337	11.9
CPA	Roger Peacock	158	5.6
Turnout		2,842	27.2
Rejected ballots		9	0.3
Registered electors		10,466	
Conservative win (new seat)			
Conservative win (new seat)			
Conservative win (new seat)			

=== Rainham South West ===
Rainham South West (2 seats)
Party	Candidate	Votes	%
Conservative	Barry Kemp*	1,177	50.2
Conservative	Mark Joy	1,027	43.8
Labour	Christopher Brown	750	31.8
Labour	Alpa Shah	498	21.1
Green	Liz O'Hanlon	341	14.5
Liberal Democrats	Alan Jefferies	269	11.4
Independent	Matt Durcan	226	9.6
Independent	Callum Evans	96	4.1
Turnout		2,355	32.2
Rejected ballots		12	0.5
Registered electors		7,309	
Conservative win (new seat)			
Conservative win (new seat)			

=== Rochester East and Warren Wood ===
Rochester East and Warren Wood (3 seats)
Party	Candidate	Votes	%
Labour Co-op	Teresa Murray*	1,658	63.0
Labour Co-op	Lauren Edwards*	1,517	57.5
Labour Co-op	Tristan Osborne*	1,347	51.1
Conservative	George Clarke	784	29.8
Conservative	Sylvia Griffin*	755	28.6
Conservative	Tolga Sirlan	665	25.2
Green	Marilyn Stone	370	14.0
Liberal Democrats	Sarah Manuel	206	7.8
Turnout		2,636	28.2
Rejected ballots		6	0.2
Registered electors		9,363	
Labour Co-op win (new seat)			
Labour Co-op win (new seat)			
Labour Co-op win (new seat)			

=== Rochester West and Borstal ===
Rochester West and Borstal (3 seats)
Party	Candidate	Votes	%
Labour Co-op	Alex Paterson*	1,807	54.4
Labour Co-op	Linda Bowen	1,670	49.6
Labour Co-op	Paula Hamilton	1,624	48.2
Conservative	Stuart Tranter*	1,336	39.7
Conservative	Faith Rivers	1,080	32.1
Conservative	Tim Joiner	1,010	30.4
Green	Stuart Worsley	536	15.9
Liberal Democrats	Anita Holloway	303	9.0
Turnout		3,366	38.9
Rejected ballots		47	1.4
Registered electors		8,651	
Labour Co-op win (new seat)			
Labour Co-op win (new seat)			
Labour Co-op win (new seat)			

=== St Mary's Island ===
St Mary's Island
Party	Candidate	Votes	%
Conservative	Habib Tejan*	479	44.6
Liberal Democrats	John Castle	323	30.1
Labour	David Hodges	224	20.9
Green	Caroline Bowes	47	4.4
Majority		156	14.5
Turnout		1,076	32.8
Rejected ballots		3	0.3
Registered electors		3,284	
Conservative win (new seat)			

=== Strood North and Frindsbury ===
Strood North and Frindsbury (3 seats)
Party	Candidate	Votes	%
Labour Co-op	Zoe Dyke*	1,774	53.6
Labour Co-op	Stephen Hubbard*	1,758	52.9
Labour Co-op	David Field	1,682	50.6
Conservative	Gareth Batts	1,202	36.3
Conservative	Craig Liddell	1,078	32.4
Conservative	Akin Edun	1,069	32.2
Green	Andrew Stephen	393	11.8
Liberal Democrats	Alexander Clark	245	7.4
Heritage	Peter Burch	217	6.5
Turnout		3,323	31.9
Rejected ballots		16	0.5
Registered electors		10,418	
Labour Co-op win (new seat)			
Labour Co-op win (new seat)			
Labour Co-op win (new seat)			

=== Strood Rural ===
Strood Rural (3 seats)
Party	Candidate	Votes	%	±%
Conservative	John Williams*	1,458	52.1	+9.6
Conservative	Gary Etheridge*	1,446	51.6	+11.5
Conservative	Elizabeth Turpin*	1,409	49.4	+13.1
Labour	Robert Wyatt	849	29.8	+12.5
Labour	Elaine Thomas	786	27.6	+12.3
Labour	Derek Munton	742	26.0	+12.2
Green	Neil Atkinson	379	13.3	–1.5
Liberal Democrats	Joanna Clark	304	10.7	+0.4
Liberal Democrats	Andrew Millsom	282	9.9	N/A
Liberal Democrats	Alan Wells	219	7.7	N/A
Turnout		2,852	27.9	
Rejected ballots		51	1.8	
Registered electors		10,218		
Conservative hold				
Conservative hold				
Conservative hold				

=== Strood West ===
Strood West (3 seats)
Party	Candidate	Votes	%
Labour Co-op	Sharon Jackson	1,338	50.9
Labour Co-op	Mark Jones	1,291	48.6
Labour Co-op	Satinder Shokar	1,236	46.5
Conservative	Isaac Igwe	991	37.3
Conservative	Josie Iles*	972	36.6
Conservative	Chris Buckwell*	970	36.9
Green	Susan Griffiths	262	9.9
Liberal Democrats	Michael Wild	159	6.0
Independent	Rob Heathfield	155	5.8
Turnout		2,656	26.2
Rejected ballots		27	1.0
Registered electors		10,150	
Labour Co-op win (new seat)			
Labour Co-op win (new seat)			
Labour Co-op win (new seat)			

=== Twydall ===
Twydall (2 seats)
Party	Candidate	Votes	%	±%
Labour Co-op	Hazel Browne*	967	56.7	+18.8
Labour Co-op	Mark Prenter*	869	50.7	+15.5
Conservative	Mitchell Brewer	502	29.5	–0.2
Conservative	Louise Smith	489	28.5	+0.7
Green	Kate Belmonte	222	12.9	–1.0
Liberal Democrats	Maureen Ruparel	151	8.8	+1.0
Turnout		1,716	24.1	
Rejected ballots		12	0.7	
Registered electors		7,120		
Labour Co-op hold				
Labour Co-op hold				

=== Watling ===
Watling (3 seats)
Party	Candidate	Votes	%	±%
Labour Co-op	Chrissy Stamp*	1,998	61.6	+25.8
Labour Co-op	Tracy Coombs	1,977	59.8	+31.1
Labour Co-op	Marian Nestorov	1,823	55.2	N/A
Conservative	Steven Marsden	985	30.4	–5.7
Conservative	Tina Venus-Coppard	817	24.7	–2.9
Conservative	Adam Strudwick-Long	808	24.5	N/A
Green	Tina Munro	361	10.9	–0.2
Liberal Democrats	David Yale	313	9.5	–8.2
Turnout		3,304	32.6	
Rejected ballots		59	1.8	
Registered electors		10,149		
Labour Co-op hold				
Labour Co-op gain from Conservative				
Labour Co-op win (new seat)				

=== Wayfield and Weeds Wood ===
Wayfield and Weeds Wood (2 seats)
Party	Candidate	Votes	%
Labour Co-op	Esther Cook	986	51.0
Labour Co-op	Eddie Peake	915	46.9
Conservative	Caroline Burns	799	41.3
Conservative	Nawal Rai	689	35.4
Green	Judith Northwood-Boorman	121	6.2
Liberal Democrats	Herbert Crack	108	5.5
SDP	Steve Tanner	74	3.8
Turnout		1,949	27.3
Rejected ballots		16	0.8
Registered electors		7,143	
Labour Co-op win (new seat)			
Labour Co-op win (new seat)			

== Changes 2023–2027 ==
- Elizabeth Turpin (Strood Rural), elected as a Conservative, and John Williams (Strood Rural), formerly of the Conservative group, joined the Independent Group in 2024.
- Stephen Hubbard (Strood North and Frindsbury) and Satinder Shokar (Strood West), both elected as Labour councillors, re-joined the Labour and Co-operative Group by April 2025.
- Robbie Lammas (Princes Park), elected as a Conservative, joined Reform UK in October 2025 and was listed by the council as an independent member by September 2026.
- Andrew Lawrence (Hempstead and Wigmore), elected as a Conservative, was listed by the council as an independent member by September 2026 and announced that he was launching a new political party.

=== By-elections ===
==== Rochester East and Warren Wood ====
By-elections for two seats were held on 6 February 2025 after Labour councillors Lauren Edwards and Tristan Osborne resigned on being elected as MPs. Reform UK gained both seats.

Rochester East and Warren by-election: 6 February 2025
Party	Candidate	Votes	%
Reform	David Finch	870	37.7
Reform	John Vye	802	34.7
Labour Co-op	Carolyn Hart	781	33.8
Labour Co-op	Robert Wyatt	717	31.1
Conservative	George Clarke	479	20.7
Conservative	Tolga Sirlan	432	18.7
Green	Doug Bray	141	6.1
Green	Jeremy Spyby-Steanson	109	4.7
Liberal Democrats	Anita Holloway	81	3.5
Liberal Democrats	Sarah Manuel	80	3.5
Heritage	Peter Burch	21	0.9
Turnout		2,317	24.4
Rejected ballots		8	0.3
Registered electors		9,482	
Reform gain from Labour Co-op			
Reform gain from Labour Co-op			

==== Gillingham South ====
A by-election was held on 6 February 2025 after Labour councillor Naushabah Khan resigned on being elected as an MP. Labour held the seat.

Gillingham South by-election: 6 February 2025
Party	Candidate	Votes	%	±%
Labour Co-op	Liubov Nestorova	706	37.4	–19.9
Reform	Rizvi Rawoof	506	26.8	N/A
Conservative	Saboor Ahmed	330	17.5	–0.5
Green	Trish Marchant	167	8.8	–4.4
Liberal Democrats	Onyx Rist	99	5.2	–6.2
SDP	Peter Wheeler	69	3.7	N/A
Heritage	Roshan Bhunnoo	12	0.6	N/A
Majority		200	10.6	N/A
Turnout		1,895	16.4	
Rejected ballots		5	0.3	
Registered electors		11,583		
Labour Co-op hold				

==== Cuxton, Halling and Riverside ====
A by-election was held on 23 July 2026 after the death of Conservative councillor Phil Filmer. Reform UK gained the seat from the Conservatives.

Cuxton, Halling and Riverside by-election: 23 July 2026
Party	Candidate	Votes	%	±%
Reform	William Burvill	838	35.7	N/A
Conservative	Richard Thorne	726	30.9	−12.9
Green	Trish Marchant	482	20.5	−11.4
Labour	Iain Childs	269	11.4	−9.2
Liberal Democrats	Ronald Gillett	35	1.5	−2.3
Majority		112	4.8	N/A
Turnout		2,352	37.5	+6.6
Rejected ballots		2	0.1	
Registered electors		6,267		
Reform gain from Conservative				
