= Medway Council =

Local authority of Medway in Kent, England

- Coat of arms

- Council logo

Type
- Type: Unitary authority

History
- Founded: 1 April 1998
- Preceded by: Rochester-upon-Medway City Council and Gillingham Borough Council

Leadership
- Mayor: Douglas Hamandishe, Labour since 13 May 2026
- Leader: Vince Maple, Labour since 24 May 2023
- Chief Executive: Richard Hicks since 1 August 2023

Structure
- Seats: 59 councillors
- Political groups: Administration (31) Labour (31) Other parties (28) Conservative (18) Independent (7) Reform UK (3)
- Length of term: 4 years

Elections
- Voting system: First past the post
- Last election: 4 May 2023
- Next election: 6 May 2027

Motto
- Forward Together

Meeting place
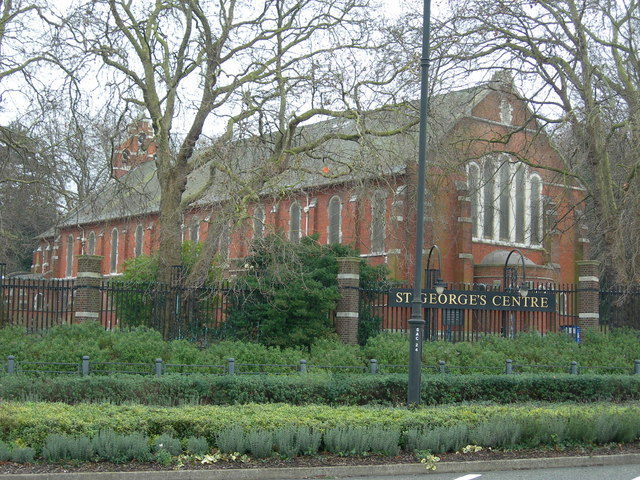
- St George's Centre, Pembroke Road, Chatham, ME4 4UH

Website
- www.medway.gov.uk

Constitution
- Constitution of Medway Council

Medway Council is the local authority of Medway, a local government district in the ceremonial county of Kent, England. The council is a unitary authority, being a district council which also performs the functions of a county council; it is independent from Kent County Council. The council was created on 1 April 1998 and replaced Rochester-upon-Medway City Council and Gillingham Borough Council.

The council entered no overall control following by-elections in February 2025, but has since returned to a Labour majority. It meets at the St George's Centre in the Chatham Maritime area of the borough and has its main offices at Gun Wharf in Chatham.

== History ==
Throughout the 19th century there had been proposals to join the Medway towns under a single authority. By 1903 moves began to take place: that year saw the creation of the Borough of Gillingham, to which, in 1928, the adjoining parish of Rainham was added.

In 1944, a Medway Towns Joint Amalgamation Committee was formed by the borough corporations of Chatham, Gillingham and Rochester, to discuss the possibility of the towns forming a single county borough. In 1948 the Local Government Boundary Commission recommended that the area become a "most purposes" county borough, but the recommendation was not carried out. In 1956 the Joint Amalgamation Committee decided in favour of the amalgamation and invited representatives from Strood Rural District Council to join the committee. In 1960, a proposal was made by Rochester Council that the merger be effected by the city absorbing the two other towns, in order to safeguard its ancient charters and city status. This led to Gillingham Council voting to leave the committee, as it believed the three towns should go forward as equal partners. On 9 March, the committee held its last meeting, with the Chatham representatives voting to dissolve the body and those from Rochester voting against. The motion to disband was passed on the casting vote of the chairman, Alderman Semple from Chatham.

Under the Local Government Act 1972, on 1 April 1974 the City of Rochester, the Borough of Chatham and part of Strood Rural District were amalgamated to form the Borough of Medway, a local government district in the county of Kent. Gillingham chose to remain separate. Under letters patent the former city council area was to continue to be styled the "City of Rochester" to "perpetuate the ancient name" and to recall "the long history and proud heritage of the said city". The city was unique, as it had no council or charter trustees and no mayor or civic head. In 1979, the Borough of Medway was renamed as Rochester-upon-Medway, and in 1982 further letters patent transferred the city status to the entire borough.

On 1 April 1998, the existing local government districts of Rochester-upon-Medway and Gillingham were abolished under the local government review and merged to become the new unitary authority of Medway, administratively independent from Kent County Council. The Lieutenancies Act 1997 was amended to keep Medway in Kent for ceremonial purposes. With effect from 1 April 1998, the incoming council changed the borough and non-metropolitan county's name from Medway Towns to just Medway.

=== City status ===
Since it was the local government district of Rochester-upon-Medway that officially held city status under the 1982 letters patent, when it was abolished, it also ceased to be a city. The other local government districts with city status that were abolished around this time (Bath and Hereford) appointed charter trustees to maintain the existence of the city and the mayoralty. However, Rochester-upon-Medway City Council had decided not to and as a result their city status was rescinded. Medway Council apparently only became aware of this when they discovered that Rochester was not on the Lord Chancellor's Office's list of cities.

Medway applied for city status in the 2000 and 2002 competitions, but was unsuccessful. In 2010, it started to refer to the "City of Medway" in promotional material, but it was rebuked and instructed not to do so in future by the Advertising Standards Authority.

Medway Council made a further bid for city status in 2012, when three cities were afforded the honour as part of The Queen's Diamond Jubilee civic honours competition. Ultimately Medway was unsuccessful with the eventual winners being Chelmsford (Essex), Perth (Perthshire), and St Asaph (Denbighshire).

=== Abolition and replacement ===
Under current local government reform plans, Medway Council will be abolished in 2028, with its area forming part of a new North Kent unitary authority which will also include the districts of Dartford and Gravesham. Elections to the new authority will take place in May 2027.

== Governance ==
As a unitary authority, the council provides both district-level and county-level services. Parts of the borough (generally the more rural north and south-west) are included in civil parishes, which form an additional tier of local government for their areas.

=== Political control ===
Following the 2023 election, the council was under Labour majority control. Labour lost their majority following two by-elections in February 2025, both of which were won by Reform UK at the expense of Labour. Labour continued to run the council as a minority administration, partly assisted by the fact that two of the independent councillors were former Labour councillors who were suspended from the party. These two councillors have subsequently been readmitted to Labour, returning the council to a Labour majority.

The first election to the council was held in 1997. It acted as a shadow authority alongside the outgoing authorities until the new arrangements formally came into effect on 1 April 1998. Political control of the council since 1998 has been as follows:

Party in control	Years
No overall control	1998–2003
Conservative	2003–2023
Labour	2023–2025
No overall control	2025
Labour	2025-present

=== Leadership ===
The role of Mayor of Medway is largely ceremonial. Political leadership is instead provided by the leader of the council. The first leader, John Shaw, had been the last leader of the old Rochester-upon-Medway City Council. The leaders since 1998 have been:

Councillor	Party	From	To
John Shaw	Labour	1 April 1998	Apr 1999
Paul Godwin	Labour	May 1999	May 2000
Rodney Chambers	Conservative	May 2000	May 2015
Alan Jarrett	Conservative	27 May 2015	May 2023
Vince Maple	Labour	24 May 2023	

=== Composition ===
Following the 2023 election and subsequent by-elections and changes of allegiance up to July 2026, the composition of the council was:

Party	Councillors
Labour	31
Conservative	18
Reform	3
Independent	7
Total	59

Five of the independents sit together as the 'Independent Group'.

=== Digital services ===
==== Artificial intelligence ====
In April 2026, Medway Council launched Agent Ex, an AI search tool developed with Jadu that replaced keyword search and provides answers from council website content using typed, spoken, or multilingual queries.

== Elections ==
Since the last boundary changes in 2023, the council has comprised 59 councillors representing 24 wards, with each ward electing one, two or three councillors. Elections are held every four years.

== Premises ==
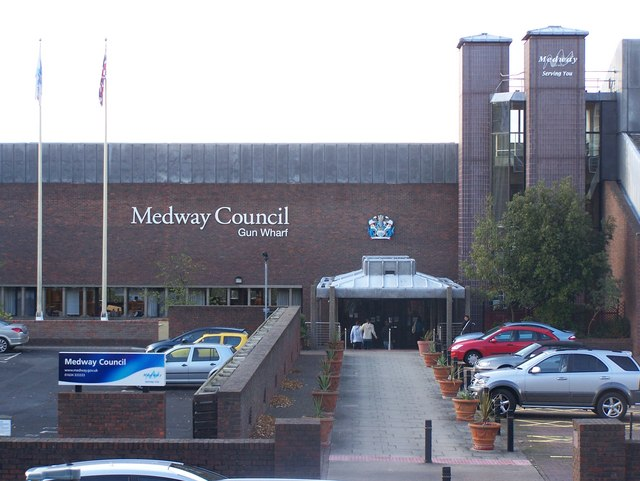
Council's main offices: Gun Wharf, Dock Road, Chatham, ME4 4TR

Full council meetings are generally held at the St George's Centre, along with some committee meetings. It was completed in 1906 as a chapel for the Royal Naval Barracks, Chatham. The building has a Chatham postal address, but was in the borough of Gillingham prior to the creation of Medway in 1998.

The council's main offices are usually at Gun Wharf on Dock Road in Chatham. The building was completed in 1978 as offices for Lloyd's of London. They vacated it in 2006, after which the council bought the building to use as its headquarters. The building was temporarily closed in 2023 following the discovery of problems with parts of the building's reinforced autoclaved aerated concrete structure. The building is not anticipated to reopen until 2026.

== Arms ==
Coat of arms of Medway Council

Notes
Granted 22 November 1999 by the College of Arms.
Crest
Issuing from a naval crown Or three towers Argent that in the centre wreathed below the battements with a garland of broom Proper the outer towers similarly wreathed with a garland of oak Azure.
Escutcheon
Azure issuing in base a bridge of four arches the parapet enarched Argent and statant thereon a lion passant guardant Or armed and languid Gules.
Supporters
On either side a sea horse Argent the piscine parts Azure each supporting a trident palewise Or and gorged with a collar checky Or and Gules pendent therefrom by a ring a harp Or stringed Argent.
Badge
Statant upon two pallets wavy their apexes conjoined to a chevron reversed wavy Azure a lion passant guardant Or armed and langued Gules.

== Financial difficulties ==
The council has been grappling with significant financial difficulties in recent years, leading to growing concerns about its ability to continue providing essential public services. In early 2024, the council faced a projected budget gap of £28 million for the 2024/25 financial year, with projections indicating even larger shortfalls in subsequent years. By 2025/26, the gap could reach £49 million, and by 2026/27, £65 million. This alarming situation led some to predict that the council might be forced to declare bankruptcy or issue a Section 114 order, restricting spending to only essential services. These concerns were further exacerbated by the council's rising debt levels, which had already reached £225 million by 2024, the highest of any district council in Kent. While the debt was accumulated through large capital projects aimed at regenerating Medway, such as the redevelopment of Mountbatten House and the Pentagon Shopping Centre, the financial burden has placed significant strain on the council's ability to meet its obligations.

Medway’s financial challenges are compounded by the increasing demand for social care services, which have become one of the primary drivers of the council's overspending. Adult and children's services, both of which are demand driven and costly, have put immense pressure on the budget. The council has been forced to allocate significant additional resources to meet the rising costs of out-of-area placements for vulnerable children and the high cost of agency workers needed to fill staffing shortages. In the case of adult social care, the council was found to require an additional £4 million to address the growing need, while children's services were facing an overspend of £7.6 million. Inflation has also played a key role in exacerbating these pressures, as the rising costs of goods and services have made it more expensive for the council to deliver its services. The council’s budget for children's services, initially set at £57 million, was strained by these unforeseen costs, further deepening the financial crisis. In response to the growing budget shortfall, Medway Council has proposed several measures to address the situation. Among these measures, the council has considered borrowing an additional £30 million over the next two years to shore up its finances and cover immediate shortfalls. There have also been discussions about using £5 million in reserve funds to cover a projected £12 million overspend for the current financial year. Additionally, the council has considered borrowing another £20 million to refurbish its headquarters, which has been temporarily closed due to structural issues with the building. However, these efforts to address the financial gap have raised concerns about the council's long-term financial sustainability, as continued borrowing only adds to the council's already substantial debt burden. Medway is not alone in facing financial difficulties; many other councils across Kent and the UK are grappling with similar issues. Kent County Council, for example, has issued warnings about its financial situation, stating that it could face bankruptcy within two years without substantial government intervention. Medway Council’s situation is a reflection of the broader financial challenges faced by local governments, which have been caused by a combination of inflation, rising demand for services, and cuts to central government funding. As local authorities continue to struggle with these pressures, the financial outlook for Medway remains uncertain. While the council's new Labour administration, which took power in May 2023, has expressed confidence that bankruptcy is not imminent, it is clear that significant efforts will be required to stabilize the council’s finances.

In light of the ongoing financial crisis, Medway Council has been lobbying the central government for additional funding to help ease the burden. Council Leader Vince Maple has called for more financial support, particularly for demand-led services like adult and children's social care, which are placing the greatest strain on the council’s budget. Maple has also advocated for more flexibility in how funding can be allocated to meet the growing pressures, arguing that the current funding arrangements are insufficient to cope with the demands placed on local authorities. Despite these efforts, the council's ability to secure the necessary funding remains uncertain, and the financial outlook for Medway continues to be a cause for concern. As the council faces difficult decisions about how to balance its budget and manage its debt, the future of local services in Medway is at risk. The Labour administration has committed to finding a solution, but it is clear that significant reform and support from the government will be necessary to address the underlying financial challenges.

== Kyndi ==
Kyndi Limited is a Local authority trading company wholly owned by Medway Council. It was established in 2015 as Medway Commercial Group to deliver services such as CCTV monitoring, telecare, and out-of-hours call handling. In 2019, the company became subject to an ongoing investigation by Kent Police into historical financial transactions between 2017 and 2019.

== Medway Archives Centre ==
Medway Archives Centre (formerly the Medway Archives and Local Studies Centre, MALSC) is the local archives service of Medway Council. It preserves and provides access to historical records for the Medway area. Its holdings include official records, local history books, periodicals, newspapers, maps, photographs and other materials relating to the history and people of Medway.

The centre aims “to help everyone discover the stories of Medway’s people and places”, serving the towns of Strood, Rochester, Chatham, Gillingham and Rainham as well as surrounding villages and the Hoo Peninsula. Medway Archives Centre has a public search room (for local studies collections) and a secure archives reading room (for original documents), as well as digital catalogues and research guides. In 2021 the service was awarded Archive Service Accreditation (the UK standard for archival services).

== Medway Development Company ==
Medway Development Company is a housing and regeneration company owned by Medway Council. It was established in 2017 to deliver residential developments on council-owned land, supporting local regeneration initiatives and housing targets.
