= Opinion polling for the 2015 United Kingdom general election =

Opinion polling for the 2015 United Kingdom general election was carried out by various organisations carried out opinion polling to gauge voting intention. Most of the polling companies listed are members of the British Polling Council (BPC) and abide by its disclosure rules. The opinion polls listed range from the previous election on 6 May 2010 to the election on 7 May 2015.

In the event, the actual results proved markedly different from those indicated by the opinion polls in the final weeks, and even last few days, of the campaign. Although an extremely tight race between Labour and the Conservatives was expected, the actual results showed a stronger-than-expected performance from the Conservatives, with Labour producing lower figures than expected.

== Graphical summary ==
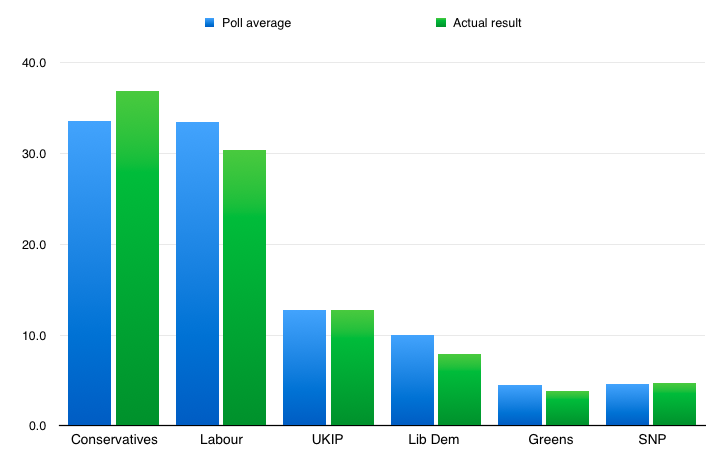

== Guide to tables ==
Poll results are listed in the tables below in reverse chronological order. The highest percentage figure in each poll is displayed in bold, and its background is shaded in the leading party's colour. The "lead" column shows the percentage point difference between the two parties with the highest figures. When a poll result is a tie, the figures with the highest percentages are shaded and displayed in bold.

"Green" in these tables refers to combined totals for the green parties in the United Kingdom, namely the Green Party of England and Wales, the Scottish Greens, and, for polls of the entire UK rather than just Great Britain, the Green Party Northern Ireland. The three parties share a commitment to environmental policies, but are independent of one another, with each contesting elections only in its own region.

== National poll results ==
Most national opinion polls do not cover Northern Ireland, which has different major political parties from the rest of the United Kingdom. This distinction is made in the tables below in the area column, where "GB" means Great Britain (England, Scotland and Wales), and "UK" means the entire United Kingdom. Plaid Cymru only stand candidates in Wales and the Scottish National Party (SNP) only stand candidates in Scotland.

=== 2015 ===
Date(s) conducted	Polling organisation/client	Sample size	Con	Lab	LD	UKIP	Grn	Others	Lead
7 May 2015	2015 general election (Note: GB results only; excludes Northern Ireland.)	–	**37.8%**	31.2%	8.1%	12.9%	3.8%	6.3%	6.6
5–7 May	Populus	3,917	**34%**	**34%**	9%	13%	5%	6%	Tie
6 May	Survation (Note: Published after election day.)	1,045	**37%**	31%	10%	11%	5%	6%	6
30 Apr – 6 May	SurveyMonkey	18,131	**34%**	28%	7%	13%	8%	9%	6
5–6 May	Lord Ashcroft	3,028	**33%**	**33%**	10%	11%	6%	8%	Tie
5–6 May	Ipsos MORI/Evening Standard	1,186	**36%**	35%	8%	11%	5%	5%	1
4–6 May	YouGov/The Sun	10,307	**34%**	**34%**	10%	12%	4%	6%	Tie
5–6 May	ComRes/Daily Mail, ITV News	1,007	**35%**	34%	9%	12%	4%	6%	1
4–6 May	Survation/Daily Mirror (Note: Headline figures published to one decimal place: Con 31.4% Lab 31.4% UKIP 15.7% LD 9.6% Green 4.8 SNP 4.7% Plaid 0.4 Others 1.9%)	4,088	**31%**	**31%**	10%	16%	5%	7%	Tie
3–6 May	ICM/The Guardian (Note: Final General Election 2015 prediction poll published 7 May 2015 with an additional 463 respondents added to the data published the previous day)	2,023	34%	**35%**	9%	11%	4%	7%	1
3–6 May	ICM/The Guardian (Note: Preliminary prediction poll published 6 May 2015)	1,560	**35%**	**35%**	9%	11%	3%	7%	Tie
1–6 May	Panelbase	3,019	31%	**33%**	8%	16%	5%	7%	2
4–5 May	Opinium	2,960	**35%**	34%	8%	12%	6%	5%	1
4–5 May	YouGov/The Sun	2,148	**34%**	**34%**	9%	12%	5%	6%	Tie
4–5 May	Survation/Daily Mirror	1,504	33%	**34%**	9%	16%	4%	4%	1
3–5 May	ComRes/Daily Mail, ITV News	1,011	**35%**	32%	9%	14%	4%	6%	3
3–5 May	BMG/May2015.com, New Statesman	1,009	**34%**	**34%**	10%	12%	4%	6%	Tie
3–4 May	YouGov/The Sun	1,664	**33%**	**33%**	10%	12%	5%	6%	Tie
30 Apr – 4 May	TNS	1,185	**33%**	32%	8%	14%	6%	6%	1
2–3 May	YouGov/The Sun	1,789	**34%**	33%	9%	12%	5%	7%	1
1–3 May	Lord Ashcroft	1,001	**32%**	30%	11%	12%	7%	9%	2
1–3 May	Populus	2,054	**34%**	**34%**	10%	13%	5%	5%	Tie
1–2 May	YouGov/Sunday Times	1,967	**34%**	33%	8%	13%	5%	7%	1
1–2 May	Survation/Mail on Sunday	2,128	31%	**34%**	8%	17%	4%	6%	3
30 Apr – 1 May	YouGov/The Sun	1,575	33%	**34%**	8%	14%	5%	5%	1
30 Apr – 1 May	Survation/Daily Mirror	1,117	33%	**34%**	9%	16%	3%	5%	1
29–30 Apr	YouGov/Sun on Sunday	1,970	34%	**35%**	9%	12%	5%	6%	1
29–30 Apr	Populus	2,016	**33%**	**33%**	9%	15%	4%	5%	Tie
29–30 Apr	YouGov/The Sun	1,729	34%	**35%**	8%	12%	5%	6%	1
29–30 Apr	Panelbase	1,020	32%	**34%**	8%	17%	4%	7%	2
28–30 Apr	ComRes/Independent on Sunday, Sunday Mirror	1,002	**33%**	**33%**	8%	13%	7%	6%	Tie
28–30 Apr	Opinium/The Observer	1,956	**35%**	34%	8%	13%	5%	5%	1
28–29 Apr	YouGov/The Sun	1,823	**35%**	34%	9%	12%	4%	6%	1
26–29 Apr	Ipsos MORI/Evening Standard	1,010	**35%**	30%	8%	10%	8%	9%	5
27–28 Apr	ComRes/ITV News, Daily Mail	1,005	**35%**	**35%**	7%	11%	6%	6%	Tie
27–28 Apr	YouGov/The Sun	1,749	34%	**35%**	9%	12%	4%	6%	1
26–27 Apr	YouGov/The Sun	2,127	**35%**	34%	9%	12%	5%	6%	1
25–27 Apr	BMG/May2015.com	1,013	**35%**	32%	11%	14%	3%	5%	3
23–27 Apr	TNS	1,186	**34%**	33%	7%	15%	5%	5%	1
25–26 Apr	YouGov/The Sun	2,096	33%	**34%**	8%	14%	5%	6%	1
24–26 Apr	Lord Ashcroft	1,003	**36%**	30%	9%	11%	7%	7%	6
24–26 Apr	ICM/The Guardian	1,004	**35%**	32%	9%	13%	5%	6%	3
24–26 Apr	Populus	2,072	33%	**36%**	8%	14%	5%	4%	3
24–25 Apr	YouGov/Sunday Times	2,271	32%	**34%**	9%	14%	6%	5%	2
24–25 Apr	Survation/Mail on Sunday	1,004	**33%**	30%	9%	18%	4%	6%	3
23–24 Apr	YouGov/The Sun	1,594	33%	**35%**	8%	13%	6%	5%	2
21–24 Apr	Opinium/The Observer	1,964	**34%**	33%	9%	13%	6%	5%	1
22–23 Apr	Populus	2,051	32%	**35%**	8%	14%	5%	6%	3
22–23 Apr	YouGov/The Sun	1,834	33%	**35%**	8%	13%	6%	6%	2
22–23 Apr	Survation/Daily Mirror	1,205	**33%**	29%	10%	18%	4%	6%	4
21–23 Apr	Panelbase	1,012	31%	**34%**	7%	17%	4%	7%	3
21–22 Apr	ComRes/ITV News, Daily Mail	1,003	**36%**	32%	8%	10%	5%	9%	4
21–22 Apr	YouGov/The Sun	2,060	33%	**34%**	7%	14%	5%	6%	1
20–21 Apr	YouGov/The Sun	1,799	**35%**	34%	7%	13%	5%	6%	1
19–20 Apr	YouGov/The Sun	2,078	34%	**35%**	7%	13%	5%	6%	1
16–20 Apr	TNS	1,199	32%	**34%**	8%	15%	5%	6%	2
18–19 Apr	YouGov/The Sun	1,675	34%	**35%**	8%	13%	5%	6%	1
17–19 Apr	Lord Ashcroft	1,002	**34%**	30%	10%	13%	4%	9%	4
17–19 Apr	Populus	2,048	32%	**34%**	9%	15%	4%	6%	2
17–19 Apr	ICM/The Guardian	1,003	**34%**	32%	10%	11%	5%	8%	2
17–18 Apr	YouGov/Sunday Times	1,780	33%	**36%**	8%	13%	5%	5%	3
16–17 Apr	Opinium/The Observer	1,955	**36%**	32%	8%	13%	5%	6%	4
16–17 Apr	YouGov/The Sun	1,713	**34%**	**34%**	9%	14%	5%	5%	Tie
16–17 Apr	Survation/Daily Mirror	1,314	**34%**	33%	7%	17%	3%	6%	1
15–16 Apr	Populus	2,048	33%	**34%**	9%	14%	4%	5%	1
15–16 Apr	YouGov/The Sun	1,939	**34%**	**34%**	7%	14%	5%	6%	Tie
14–16 Apr	Panelbase	1,025	33%	**34%**	8%	16%	4%	5%	1
14–15 Apr	YouGov/The Sun	1,894	34%	**35%**	8%	13%	5%	6%	1
12–15 Apr	Ipsos MORI/Evening Standard	1,000	33%	**35%**	7%	10%	8%	7%	2
13–14 Apr	YouGov/The Sun	1,842	33%	**35%**	8%	13%	5%	6%	2
12–13 Apr	YouGov/The Sun	2,444	33%	**34%**	8%	13%	6%	5%	1
9–13 Apr	TNS	1,192	**34%**	32%	9%	14%	5%	6%	2
11–12 Apr	YouGov/The Sun	1,717	33%	**36%**	7%	13%	5%	6%	3
10–12 Apr	Lord Ashcroft	1,003	**33%**	**33%**	9%	13%	6%	8%	Tie
10–12 Apr	ICM/The Guardian	1,042	**39%**	33%	8%	7%	7%	5%	6
10–12 Apr	Populus	2,036	**33%**	**33%**	8%	15%	5%	6%	Tie
10–11 Apr	YouGov/Sunday Times	1,887	**34%**	**34%**	7%	13%	6%	6%	Tie
9–10 Apr	YouGov/The Sun	1,782	33%	**35%**	8%	13%	5%	5%	2
8–9 Apr	Opinium/The Observer	1,916	**36%**	34%	7%	11%	6%	6%	2
8–9 Apr	Populus	2,020	31%	**33%**	8%	16%	6%	7%	2
8–9 Apr	YouGov/The Sun	1,938	**35%**	34%	8%	12%	4%	6%	1
8–9 Apr	Survation/Daily Mirror	1,111	31%	**35%**	9%	15%	4%	6%	4
7–9 Apr	Panelbase	1,013	31%	**37%**	8%	16%	4%	4%	6
7–8 Apr	ComRes/ITV News, Daily Mail	1,013	**34%**	33%	12%	12%	4%	6%	1
7–8 Apr	YouGov/The Sun	1,871	34%	**35%**	8%	13%	5%	5%	1
6–7 Apr	YouGov/The Sun	1,672	33%	**35%**	8%	14%	5%	5%	2
2–7 Apr	TNS	1,207	30%	**33%**	8%	19%	4%	7%	3
2–6 Apr	Populus	2,008	31%	**33%**	10%	15%	4%	7%	2
3–4 Apr	YouGov/Sunday Times	1,906	**34%**	33%	10%	13%	4%	6%	1
2–3 Apr	Opinium/The Observer	1,974	**33%**	**33%**	7%	14%	7%	5%	Tie
2–3 Apr	Survation/Daily Mirror	1,207	31%	**33%**	9%	18%	3%	6%	2
1–2 Apr	YouGov/The Sun	1,583	**37%**	35%	7%	12%	5%	4%	2
31 Mar – 2 Apr	Panelbase	1,006	**33%**	**33%**	7%	17%	5%	5%	Tie
31 Mar – 1 Apr	Populus	2,057	32%	**34%**	9%	15%	5%	5%	2
31 Mar – 1 Apr	YouGov/The Sun	1,678	**36%**	34%	8%	13%	4%	5%	2
30–31 Mar	YouGov/The Sun	1,566	35%	**36%**	7%	12%	5%	5%	1
30 Mar	Dissolution of Parliament and the official start of the election campaign								
29–30 Mar	YouGov/The Sun	2,001	**35%**	**35%**	8%	12%	5%	5%	Tie
26–30 Mar	TNS	1,197	**33%**	32%	8%	16%	5%	7%	1
28–29 Mar	ComRes/ITV News, Daily Mail	1,005	**36%**	32%	9%	12%	5%	7%	4
27–29 Mar	Lord Ashcroft	1,004	**36%**	34%	6%	10%	7%	6%	2
27–29 Mar	Populus	2,004	**34%**	**34%**	8%	15%	4%	5%	Tie
27–28 Mar	YouGov/Sunday Times	1,799	32%	**36%**	8%	13%	6%	5%	4
25–26 Mar	Populus	2,049	31%	**33%**	9%	16%	5%	6%	2
25–26 Mar	YouGov/The Sun	1,698	**36%**	34%	7%	13%	5%	5%	2
24–26 Mar	Panelbase	1,007	**34%**	**34%**	5%	15%	6%	6%	Tie
24–25 Mar	Opinium/The Observer	1,959	**34%**	33%	8%	13%	7%	3%	1
24–25 Mar	YouGov/The Sun	1,610	34%	**35%**	8%	12%	6%	5%	1
24–25 Mar	Survation/Daily Mirror	1,007	32%	**33%**	8%	18%	4%	5%	1
23–24 Mar	YouGov/The Sun	2,006	**35%**	**35%**	8%	12%	6%	4%	Tie
22–23 Mar	YouGov/The Sun	1,641	**34%**	**34%**	8%	12%	6%	5%	Tie
18–23 Mar	YouGov/The Times	8,271	**34%**	33%	8%	14%	5%	6%	1
20–22 Mar	ComRes/ITV News, Daily Mail	1,001	**35%**	**35%**	8%	10%	7%	6%	Tie
20–22 Mar	Lord Ashcroft	1,003	**33%**	**33%**	8%	12%	5%	9%	Tie
20–22 Mar	Populus	2,035	31%	**33%**	9%	16%	5%	5%	2
20–21 Mar	Survation/Mail on Sunday	1,008	30%	**34%**	10%	17%	3%	6%	4
19–20 Mar	YouGov/Sunday Times	1,532	33%	**35%**	8%	14%	5%	5%	2
18–19 Mar	Opinium/The Observer	1,979	**36%**	33%	7%	14%	6%	4%	3
18–19 Mar	Populus	2,020	31%	**34%**	9%	17%	5%	4%	3
18–19 Mar	YouGov/The Sun	2,293	**35%**	33%	8%	13%	6%	5%	2
17–18 Mar	YouGov/The Sun	1,752	33%	**34%**	8%	14%	6%	5%	1
16–17 Mar	YouGov/The Sun	1,830	34%	**36%**	7%	12%	6%	5%	2
15–16 Mar	YouGov/The Sun	1,683	33%	**35%**	7%	13%	7%	5%	2
13–16 Mar	TNS	1,188	**33%**	32%	7%	17%	4%	7%	1
13–15 Mar	Lord Ashcroft	1,002	**31%**	29%	8%	15%	8%	9%	2
13–15 Mar	ICM/The Guardian	1,001	**36%**	35%	8%	9%	4%	8%	1
13–15 Mar	Populus	2,041	**34%**	**34%**	8%	15%	5%	5%	Tie
12–13 Mar	YouGov/Sunday Times	1,669	**34%**	**34%**	7%	14%	5%	6%	Tie
11–13 Mar	ComRes/Sunday Mirror, Independent on Sunday	2,002	33%	**35%**	7%	16%	4%	5%	2
11–12 Mar	Populus	2,041	29%	**32%**	8%	18%	6%	7%	3
11–12 Mar	YouGov/The Sun	1,619	**33%**	32%	7%	16%	6%	6%	1
10–12 Mar	Opinium/The Observer	1,947	33%	**35%**	7%	14%	7%	5%	2
10–11 Mar	YouGov/The Sun	1,728	34%	**35%**	7%	14%	5%	5%	1
8–11 Mar	Ipsos MORI/Evening Standard	1,025	33%	**34%**	8%	13%	6%	6%	1
9–10 Mar	YouGov/The Sun	1,598	**33%**	31%	8%	15%	6%	6%	2
8–9 Mar	YouGov/The Sun	1,745	**35%**	31%	8%	14%	6%	6%	4
6–8 Mar	Lord Ashcroft	1,003	**34%**	30%	5%	15%	8%	7%	4
6–8 Mar	Populus	2,026	32%	**33%**	9%	15%	6%	6%	1
5–6 Mar	YouGov/Sunday Times	1,754	**34%**	33%	8%	15%	5%	5%	1
3–6 Mar	Opinium/The Observer	1,961	**34%**	**34%**	8%	14%	7%	5%	Tie
4–5 Mar	Populus	2,063	31%	**33%**	8%	16%	5%	5%	2
4–5 Mar	YouGov/The Sun	1,748	31%	**35%**	6%	15%	8%	4%	4
3–4 Mar	YouGov/The Sun	1,544	**34%**	**34%**	8%	14%	6%	4%	Tie
2–3 Mar	YouGov/The Sun	1,701	**36%**	34%	5%	14%	6%	5%	2
1–2 Mar	YouGov/The Sun	1,866	**35%**	32%	7%	15%	6%	5%	3
27 Feb – 1 Mar	Lord Ashcroft	1,003	**34%**	31%	7%	14%	7%	8%	3
27 Feb – 1 Mar	Populus	2,056	32%	**34%**	8%	14%	5%	7%	2
26–27 Feb	YouGov/Sunday Times	1,959	**34%**	**34%**	8%	14%	5%	5%	Tie
25–27 Feb	Populus	2,005	31%	**33%**	9%	16%	6%	5%	2
25–26 Feb	YouGov/The Sun	1,638	33%	**34%**	8%	13%	6%	6%	1
24–26 Feb	Opinium/The Observer	1,948	34%	**35%**	6%	14%	6%	6%	1
24–25 Feb	YouGov/The Sun	1,581	**33%**	**33%**	8%	15%	6%	5%	Tie
23–24 Feb	YouGov/The Sun	1,520	**35%**	33%	6%	14%	7%	5%	2
23 Feb	Survation/Daily Mirror	1,046	28%	**34%**	10%	19%	4%	5%	6
22–23 Feb	YouGov/The Sun	1,772	**33%**	**33%**	8%	13%	7%	5%	Tie
20–23 Feb	ComRes/Daily Mail	1,004	**34%**	32%	8%	13%	8%	6%	2
20–22 Feb	Lord Ashcroft	1,004	32%	**36%**	7%	11%	8%	6%	4
20–22 Feb	Populus	2,059	**34%**	**34%**	9%	15%	6%	6%	Tie
19–20 Feb	YouGov/Sunday Times	1,568	33%	**34%**	8%	13%	6%	6%	1
17–20 Feb	Opinium/The Observer	1,975	**35%**	33%	6%	15%	7%	5%	2
18–19 Feb	Populus	2,011	31%	**32%**	9%	17%	6%	5%	1
18–19 Feb	YouGov/The Sun	1,564	32%	**33%**	9%	15%	6%	5%	1
17–18 Feb	YouGov/The Sun	1,743	32%	**34%**	8%	14%	6%	5%	2
16–17 Feb	YouGov/The Sun	1,548	33%	**34%**	6%	15%	7%	5%	1
15–16 Feb	YouGov/The Sun	1,580	**32%**	**32%**	6%	16%	8%	5%	Tie
12–16 Feb	TNS	1,193	28%	**35%**	6%	18%	7%	6%	7
13–15 Feb	Lord Ashcroft	1,004	30%	**31%**	9%	16%	8%	6%	1
13–15 Feb	Populus	2,012	31%	**33%**	10%	15%	5%	5%	2
13–15 Feb	ICM/The Guardian	1,000	**36%**	32%	10%	9%	7%	7%	4
12–13 Feb	YouGov/Sunday Times	1,620	32%	**35%**	7%	15%	7%	5%	3
11–12 Feb	ComRes/Sunday Mirror, Independent on Sunday	2,017	32%	**34%**	7%	16%	4%	7%	2
11–12 Feb	Populus	2,055	31%	**34%**	9%	14%	6%	6%	3
11–12 Feb	YouGov/The Sun	1,592	31%	**34%**	7%	15%	7%	6%	3
10–12 Feb	Opinium/The Observer	1,969	33%	**35%**	8%	14%	6%	6%	2
10–11 Feb	YouGov/The Sun	1,764	32%	**33%**	7%	15%	7%	6%	1
9–10 Feb	YouGov/The Sun	1,677	33%	**35%**	6%	13%	8%	5%	2
8–10 Feb	Ipsos MORI/Evening Standard	1,010	34%	**36%**	6%	9%	7%	8%	2
8–9 Feb	YouGov/The Sun	1,552	**34%**	33%	7%	14%	7%	6%	1
6–8 Feb	Lord Ashcroft	1,003	**34%**	31%	9%	14%	6%	6%	3
6–8 Feb	Populus	2,003	33%	**34%**	8%	15%	4%	4%	1
5–6 Feb	YouGov/Sunday Times	1,668	32%	**33%**	7%	15%	8%	5%	1
3–6 Feb	Opinium/The Observer	1,947	32%	**34%**	7%	15%	8%	4%	2
4–5 Feb	Populus	2,056	31%	**34%**	8%	16%	5%	6%	3
4–5 Feb	YouGov/The Sun	1,719	32%	**33%**	9%	15%	5%	5%	1
3–4 Feb	YouGov/The Sun	1,749	**34%**	33%	6%	13%	7%	7%	1
2–3 Feb	YouGov/The Sun	1,705	**33%**	**33%**	7%	14%	7%	5%	Tie
1–2 Feb	YouGov/The Sun	1,630	33%	**35%**	7%	14%	6%	5%	2
30 Jan – 2 Feb	Populus	2,040	31%	**34%**	8%	14%	5%	6%	3
29 Jan – 2 Feb	TNS	1,182	27%	**33%**	6%	18%	8%	8%	6
30 Jan – 1 Feb	Lord Ashcroft	1,002	**31%**	**31%**	8%	15%	9%	6%	Tie
29–30 Jan	YouGov/Sunday Times	1,550	32%	**35%**	7%	15%	6%	5%	3
27–30 Jan	Opinium/The Observer	1,975	32%	**33%**	5%	18%	6%	6%	1
28–29 Jan	Populus	2,020	34%	**35%**	10%	14%	4%	3%	1
28–29 Jan	YouGov/The Sun	1,593	**34%**	**34%**	6%	14%	7%	5%	Tie
27–28 Jan	YouGov/The Sun	1,548	**33%**	**33%**	6%	16%	7%	5%	Tie
26–27 Jan	YouGov/The Sun	1,655	**34%**	33%	7%	14%	7%	5%	1
25–26 Jan	YouGov/The Sun	1,656	**34%**	33%	6%	15%	7%	5%	1
23–26 Jan	TNS-BMRB/BBC Radio 4 Woman's Hour	975	28%	**39%**	4%	14%	8%	7%	11
25 Jan	Survation/Daily Mirror	1,014	**31%**	30%	7%	23%	3%	6%	1
23–25 Jan	ComRes/The Independent	1,001	**31%**	30%	8%	17%	7%	7%	1
23–25 Jan	Populus	2,039	34%	**35%**	9%	13%	6%	3%	1
22–25 Jan	Lord Ashcroft	1,001	**32%**	**32%**	6%	15%	9%	6%	Tie
22–23 Jan	YouGov/Sunday Times	1,578	**32%**	**32%**	7%	15%	7%	6%	Tie
21–22 Jan	Populus	2,049	32%	**36%**	9%	13%	6%	4%	4
21–22 Jan	YouGov/The Sun	1,640	31%	**33%**	7%	17%	8%	4%	2
20–21 Jan	YouGov/The Sun	1,645	33%	**34%**	6%	14%	8%	5%	1
19–20 Jan	YouGov/The Sun	1,570	**32%**	30%	8%	15%	10%	5%	2
18–19 Jan	YouGov/The Sun	1,747	**32%**	**32%**	8%	15%	7%	6%	Tie
16–19 Jan	ICM/The Guardian	1,002	30%	**33%**	11%	11%	9%	7%	3
15–19 Jan	TNS	1,188	**31%**	**31%**	8%	16%	7%	7%	Tie
16–18 Jan	Lord Ashcroft	1,004	**29%**	28%	9%	15%	11%	8%	1
16–18 Jan	Populus	2,036	35%	**36%**	8%	13%	4%	4%	1
15–16 Jan	YouGov/Sunday Times	1,647	31%	**32%**	7%	18%	7%	4%	1
14–15 Jan	YouGov/Sun on Sunday	1,763	31%	**33%**	7%	16%	7%	6%	2
14–15 Jan	ComRes/Sunday Mirror, Independent on Sunday	2,023	33%	**34%**	7%	18%	3%	5%	1
14–15 Jan	Populus	2,070	32%	**35%**	9%	14%	6%	4%	3
14–15 Jan	YouGov/The Sun	1,660	**32%**	**32%**	6%	16%	8%	6%	Tie
13–15 Jan	Opinium/The Observer	1,966	28%	**33%**	7%	20%	6%	6%	5
13–14 Jan	YouGov/The Sun	1,834	32%	**34%**	6%	15%	7%	6%	2
12–13 Jan	YouGov/The Sun	1,782	32%	**33%**	7%	14%	7%	6%	1
11–13 Jan	Ipsos MORI/Evening Standard	1,010	33%	**34%**	8%	11%	8%	6%	1
11–12 Jan	YouGov/The Sun	1,649	32%	**33%**	6%	17%	6%	6%	1
9–11 Jan	Lord Ashcroft	1,002	**34%**	28%	8%	16%	8%	6%	6
9–11 Jan	Populus	2,056	32%	**37%**	10%	13%	4%	4%	5
8–9 Jan	YouGov/Sunday Times	1,684	**32%**	**32%**	7%	18%	6%	5%	Tie
7–8 Jan	Populus	2,046	33%	**34%**	8%	14%	6%	5%	1
7–8 Jan	YouGov/The Sun	1,753	**33%**	**33%**	8%	13%	7%	6%	Tie
6–8 Jan	TNS	1,201	28%	**35%**	6%	18%	5%	8%	7
6–7 Jan	YouGov/The Sun	1,707	32%	**33%**	7%	15%	7%	6%	1
5–6 Jan	YouGov/The Sun	1,769	**33%**	**33%**	7%	13%	8%	5%	Tie
4–5 Jan	YouGov/The Sun	1,728	31%	**34%**	7%	14%	8%	6%	3
2–4 Jan	Populus	2,046	34%	**36%**	9%	12%	5%	5%	2
30 Dec 2014 – 2 Jan 2015	Opinium/The Observer	1,970	32%	**33%**	8%	17%	4%	7%	1

=== 2014 ===
Date(s) conducted	Polling organisation/client	Sample size	Con	Lab	LD	UKIP	Grn	Others	Lead
19–23 Dec	Opinium/The Observer (Note: The question asked was "Thinking of the general election in May, for which party will you vote?" rather than Opinium's usual "If there were a general election tomorrow, for which party would you vote?")	2,003	29%	**33%**	6%	19%	6%	7%	4
21–22 Dec	YouGov/The Sun	1,642	32%	**36%**	6%	16%	5%	5%	4
19–21 Dec	Populus	2,051	**35%**	**35%**	9%	12%	4%	5%	Tie
18–19 Dec	Survation/Daily Mirror	1,009	30%	**33%**	10%	21%	3%	3%	3
18–19 Dec	YouGov/Sunday Times	2,109	32%	**34%**	6%	15%	8%	5%	2
16–19 Dec	Opinium/The Observer	1,427	29%	**36%**	6%	16%	5%	8%	7
17–18 Dec	Populus	2,069	34%	**35%**	9%	13%	4%	4%	1
17–18 Dec	YouGov/The Sun	1,981	30%	**35%**	6%	16%	8%	4%	5
16–17 Dec	YouGov/The Sun	2,087	**33%**	**33%**	8%	14%	7%	5%	Tie
15–16 Dec	YouGov/The Sun	2,021	33%	**34%**	6%	16%	6%	5%	1
12–16 Dec	ICM/The Guardian	1,001	28%	**33%**	14%	14%	5%	6%	5
14–15 Dec	YouGov/The Sun	1,648	32%	**34%**	6%	14%	8%	6%	2
13–15 Dec	Ipsos Mori/Evening Standard	1,012	**32%**	29%	9%	13%	9%	8%	3
11–15 Dec	TNS	1,180	28%	**35%**	5%	19%	7%	6%	7
12–14 Dec	ComRes/The Independent	1,002	29%	**32%**	12%	16%	5%	6%	3
12–14 Dec	Populus	2,074	34%	**36%**	10%	12%	5%	4%	2
11–12 Dec	YouGov/Sunday Times	1,941	**32%**	**32%**	7%	16%	7%	5%	Tie
10–12 Dec	ComRes/Sunday Mirror/Independent on Sunday	2,014	33%	**34%**	8%	18%	2%	5%	1
10–11 Dec	Populus	1,140	34%	**35%**	9%	14%	4%	3%	1
10–11 Dec	YouGov/The Sun	2,088	32%	**34%**	7%	14%	7%	6%	2
9–10 Dec	YouGov/The Sun	1,983	**33%**	**33%**	6%	15%	7%	5%	Tie
8–9 Dec	YouGov/The Sun	1,959	**32%**	**32%**	8%	15%	7%	5%	Tie
7–8 Dec	YouGov/The Sun	1,925	**34%**	33%	6%	15%	6%	6%	1
5–7 Dec	Lord Ashcroft	1,001	30%	**31%**	8%	19%	5%	7%	1
5–7 Dec	Populus	1,323	33%	**36%**	8%	15%	4%	4%	3
4–5 Dec	YouGov/SundayTimes	1,838	**32%**	**32%**	6%	17%	7%	7%	Tie
3–4 Dec	Opinium/The Observer	1,940	29%	**34%**	6%	19%	6%	6%	5
3–4 Dec	Populus	1,271	33%	**35%**	9%	14%	4%	5%	2
3–4 Dec	YouGov/The Sun	1,663	31%	**32%**	7%	15%	8%	6%	1
2–3 Dec	YouGov/The Sun	1,925	**32%**	31%	6%	17%	7%	6%	1
1–2 Dec	YouGov/The Sun	1,912	32%	**33%**	7%	16%	7%	5%	1
30 Nov – 1 Dec	YouGov/The Sun	1,763	**32%**	**32%**	8%	15%	6%	6%	Tie
28–30 Nov	ComRes/The Independent	1,005	28%	**31%**	9%	18%	7%	7%	3
28–30 Nov	Lord Ashcroft	1,003	30%	**32%**	7%	16%	6%	8%	2
28–30 Nov	Populus	2,053	32%	**35%**	9%	14%	5%	5%	3
27–28 Nov	YouGov/Sunday Times	2,018	32%	**34%**	7%	15%	6%	6%	2
26–27 Nov	Populus	2,048	32%	**37%**	9%	14%	4%	5%	5
26–27 Nov	YouGov/The Sun	1,970	**31%**	**31%**	8%	17%	6%	6%	Tie
25–27 Nov	TNS	1,194	30%	**31%**	6%	19%	6%	8%	1
25–26 Nov	YouGov/The Sun	2,067	**33%**	32%	6%	16%	7%	5%	1
24–25 Nov	YouGov/The Sun	1,890	32%	**33%**	7%	16%	6%	6%	1
23–24 Nov	YouGov/The Sun	1,641	30%	**34%**	6%	18%	6%	6%	4
14–24 Nov	Lord Ashcroft (Note: This is the VI portion (turnout weighted, Table 4) of Lord Ashcroft's NHS poll, released in January 2015. "VQ.2 If there was a general election tomorrow, which party would you vote for? Base: All respondents expressing an intention to vote (Turnout weighted)")	20,011	30%	**33%**	7%	19%	6%	5%	3
21–23 Nov	Lord Ashcroft	1,004	27%	**32%**	7%	18%	7%	8%	5
21–23 Nov	Populus	2,049	31%	**36%**	9%	15%	5%	4%	5
20–21 Nov	YouGov/Sunday Times	1,970	**33%**	**33%**	7%	16%	6%	5%	Tie
19–21 Nov	YouGov/The Sun on Sunday	2,314	33%	**34%**	8%	15%	5%	4%	1
20 Nov	Rochester and Strood by-election (UKIP gain from Con)								
19–20 Nov	Populus	2,013	33%	**36%**	9%	14%	4%	4%	3
19–20 Nov	YouGov/The Sun	1,995	**34%**	33%	7%	15%	6%	5%	1
18–20 Nov	Opinium/The Observer	1,948	30%	**33%**	7%	19%	4%	7%	3
18–19 Nov	YouGov/The Sun	1,906	**34%**	33%	7%	14%	6%	6%	1
17–18 Nov	YouGov/The Sun	1,975	32%	**34%**	7%	15%	6%	6%	2
16–17 Nov	YouGov/The Sun	1,589	**33%**	32%	7%	15%	8%	6%	1
14–17 Nov	Opinium	1,947	**34%**	33%	5%	18%	5%	6%	1
14–16 Nov	Lord Ashcroft	1,004	29%	**30%**	9%	16%	7%	9%	1
14–16 Nov	Populus	2,054	35%	**36%**	7%	11%	5%	6%	1
13–14 Nov	YouGov/Sunday Times	1,975	31%	**33%**	7%	18%	5%	6%	2
12–14 Nov	ComRes/Independent on Sunday, Sunday Mirror	2,000	30%	**34%**	8%	19%	3%	6%	4
12–13 Nov	Populus	2,052	33%	**35%**	9%	13%	4%	5%	2
12–13 Nov	YouGov/The Sun	2,003	**33%**	32%	8%	15%	6%	6%	1
11–12 Nov	YouGov/The Sun	1,972	32%	**35%**	7%	15%	6%	4%	3
10–11 Nov	YouGov/The Sun	2,143	33%	**34%**	7%	15%	6%	6%	1
9–10 Nov	YouGov/The Sun	1,656	32%	**33%**	6%	17%	6%	6%	1
8–10 Nov	Ipsos MORI/Evening Standard	1,011	**32%**	29%	9%	14%	7%	9%	3
7–9 Nov	ICM/The Guardian	1,002	31%	**32%**	11%	14%	6%	6%	1
7–9 Nov	Lord Ashcroft	1,005	**30%**	29%	10%	16%	7%	8%	1
7–9 Nov	Populus	2,047	34%	**36%**	8%	13%	4%	5%	2
7 Nov	Survation/Mail on Sunday	1,020	29%	**34%**	6%	23%	4%	4%	5
6–7 Nov	YouGov/Sunday Times	2,022	**33%**	**33%**	7%	16%	6%	5%	Tie
4–7 Nov	Opinium/The Observer	1,980	29%	**32%**	9%	19%	4%	7%	3
5–6 Nov	Populus	2,011	33%	**35%**	9%	14%	4%	4%	2
5–6 Nov	YouGov/The Sun	2,041	32%	**33%**	8%	15%	7%	5%	1
4–5 Nov	YouGov/The Sun	2,047	32%	**33%**	7%	17%	7%	5%	1
3–4 Nov	YouGov/The Sun	1,988	32%	**34%**	7%	15%	6%	6%	2
2–3 Nov	YouGov/The Sun	1,652	33%	**34%**	8%	15%	5%	5%	1
31 Oct – 2 Nov	Lord Ashcroft	1,002	**30%**	29%	10%	16%	6%	9%	1
31 Oct – 2 Nov	Populus	2,019	34%	**35%**	9%	13%	4%	4%	1
31 Oct – 1 Nov	Survation/The Mirror	2,012	27%	**31%**	9%	24%	3%	6%	4
30–31 Oct	YouGov/Sunday Times	1,808	31%	**32%**	7%	18%	6%	6%	1
29–30 Oct	Populus	2,035	**34%**	**34%**	8%	15%	5%	3%	Tie
29–30 Oct	YouGov/The Sun	1,883	**33%**	32%	7%	15%	7%	6%	1
28–29 Oct	YouGov/The Sun	1,972	31%	**34%**	6%	17%	7%	5%	3
27–28 Oct	YouGov/The Sun	2,052	32%	**33%**	8%	17%	5%	5%	1
26–27 Oct	YouGov/The Sun	1,629	**32%**	**32%**	8%	18%	6%	4%	Tie
24–26 Oct	ComRes/The Independent	1,002	**30%**	**30%**	9%	19%	4%	7%	Tie
24–26 Oct	Lord Ashcroft	1,003	**31%**	**31%**	7%	18%	5%	7%	Tie'
24–26 Oct	Populus	2,004	34%	**36%**	8%	13%	3%	4%	2
23–24 Oct	YouGov/Sunday Times	2,069	**33%**	**33%**	7%	16%	6%	6%	Tie
21–24 Oct	Opinium/The Observer	1,972	**33%**	**33%**	6%	18%	4%	5%	Tie
22–23 Oct	Populus	2,029	33%	**35%**	9%	15%	3%	4%	2
22–23 Oct	YouGov/The Sun	2,020	**34%**	**34%**	6%	15%	6%	5%	Tie
21–22 Oct	YouGov/The Sun	2,052	31%	**33%**	7%	17%	6%	6%	2
20–21 Oct	YouGov/The Sun	2,103	32%	**33%**	8%	16%	5%	5%	1
19–20 Oct	YouGov/The Sun	1,727	31%	**33%**	7%	15%	6%	8%	2
17–19 Oct	Lord Ashcroft	1,000	28%	**31%**	7%	18%	8%	8%	3
17–19 Oct	Populus	2,058	34%	**36%**	9%	13%	3%	5%	2
16–17 Oct	YouGov/Sunday Times	1,966	32%	**35%**	7%	16%	5%	6%	3
15–16 Oct	ComRes/Sunday Mirror, Independent on Sunday	996	29%	**31%**	7%	24%	5%	5%	2
15–16 Oct	ComRes/Sunday Mirror, Independent on Sunday	1,004	31%	**34%**	7%	19%	4%	5%	3
15–16 Oct	Populus	2,031	33%	**35%**	10%	14%	4%	3%	2
15–16 Oct	YouGov/The Sun	2,045	31%	**32%**	8%	18%	7%	4%	1
14–15 Oct	YouGov/The Sun	2,133	31%	**33%**	7%	19%	5%	5%	2
13–14 Oct	YouGov/The Sun	2,144	30%	**34%**	8%	18%	5%	5%	4
11–14 Oct	Ipsos MORI/Evening Standard	1,002	30%	**33%**	8%	16%	5%	8%	3
12–13 Oct	YouGov/The Sun	1,782	31%	**34%**	7%	17%	4%	7%	3
10–12 Oct	Lord Ashcroft	1,001	28%	**32%**	8%	19%	5%	8%	4
10–12 Oct	ICM/The Guardian	1,001	31%	**35%**	11%	14%	4%	6%	4
10–12 Oct	Populus	2,067	35%	**36%**	9%	13%	3%	4%	1
10 Oct	Survation/Mail on Sunday	1,003	**31%**	**31%**	7%	25%	2%	4%	Tie
9–10 Oct	YouGov/Sunday Times	2,167	32%	**34%**	9%	16%	5%	5%	2
9 Oct	Clacton by-election (UKIP gain from Con) and Heywood and Middleton by-election (Lab hold)								
8–9 Oct	Lord Ashcroft	5,059	31%	**34%**	8%	18%	4%	5%	3
8–9 Oct	Populus	2,055	34%	**35%**	9%	13%	4%	5%	1
8–9 Oct	YouGov/The Sun	2,049	30%	**35%**	9%	15%	5%	5%	5
7–9 Oct	Opinium/The Observer	1,968	28%	**35%**	9%	17%	4%	7%	7
7–8 Oct	YouGov/The Sun	1,862	33%	**34%**	7%	14%	6%	6%	1
6–7 Oct	YouGov/The Sun	2,155	32%	**34%**	8%	15%	5%	6%	2
5–6 Oct	YouGov/The Sun	1,739	**35%**	33%	8%	13%	4%	7%	2
3–5 Oct	Lord Ashcroft	1,002	**32%**	30%	7%	17%	7%	6%	2
3–5 Oct	Populus	2,037	31%	**37%**	8%	15%	3%	4%	6
2–3 Oct	YouGov/Sunday Times	2,130	**36%**	34%	7%	13%	5%	5%	2
1–2 Oct	Populus	2,014	33%	**38%**	8%	13%	3%	4%	5
1–2 Oct	YouGov/The Sun	2,133	**35%**	34%	6%	14%	5%	6%	1
30 Sep – 1 Oct	YouGov/The Sun	2,068	31%	**38%**	7%	15%	5%	4%	7
29–30 Sep	YouGov/The Sun	2,106	31%	**36%**	7%	15%	5%	6%	5
28–29 Sep	YouGov/The Sun	1,715	31%	**36%**	7%	16%	4%	6%	5
26–28 Sep	ComRes/Independent	1,007	29%	**35%**	10%	15%	4%	7%	6
26–28 Sep	Lord Ashcroft	1,000	**32%**	**32%**	8%	17%	4%	8%	Tie
26–28 Sep	Populus	2,024	34%	**36%**	7%	14%	5%	3%	2
25–26 Sep	YouGov/Sunday Times	1,992	31%	**36%**	6%	15%	6%	6%	5
24–26 Sep	ComRes/Sunday Mirror, Independent on Sunday	2,003	29%	**35%**	7%	19%	4%	6%	6
23–26 Sep	Opinium/The Observer	1,984	32%	**34%**	7%	17%	4%	6%	2
24–25 Sep	Populus	2,034	33%	**37%**	9%	13%	3%	4%	4
24–25 Sep	YouGov/The Sun	1,972	31%	**37%**	7%	13%	5%	7%	6
23–24 Sep	YouGov/The Sun	2,117	33%	**37%**	7%	13%	5%	5%	4
22–23 Sep	YouGov/The Sun	2,141	31%	**37%**	7%	15%	5%	5%	6
21–22 Sep	YouGov/The Sun	1,671	33%	**35%**	7%	14%	5%	6%	2
19–21 Sep	Lord Ashcroft	1,004	27%	**33%**	9%	17%	6%	8%	6
19–21 Sep	Populus	2,048	33%	**37%**	9%	12%	4%	4%	4
18–19 Sep	YouGov/Sunday Times	2,126	31%	**36%**	7%	16%	5%	5%	5
18 Sep	Scottish independence referendum ("No" wins)								
17–18 Sep	Populus	2,268	32%	**36%**	9%	15%	4%	5%	4
17–18 Sep	YouGov/The Sun	2,072	33%	**35%**	8%	14%	5%	5%	2
16–17 Sep	YouGov/The Sun	2,029	33%	**36%**	8%	13%	5%	5%	3
12–17 Sep	Lord Ashcroft	8,053	30%	**35%**	7%	19%	5%	6%	5
15–16 Sep	YouGov/The Sun	1,977	34%	**37%**	7%	12%	6%	4%	3
12–16 Sep	Survation/Bright Blue	1,052	29%	**34%**	11%	18%	4%	4%	5
14–15 Sep	YouGov/The Sun	1,703	31%	**35%**	7%	15%	6%	5%	4
12–14 Sep	ICM/The Guardian	1,002	33%	**35%**	10%	9%	7%	6%	2
12–14 Sep	Lord Ashcroft	1,004	**33%**	**33%**	9%	14%	6%	6%	Tie
12–14 Sep	Populus	2,052	34%	**35%**	9%	13%	3%	5%	1
12 Sep	Survation/Mail on Sunday	1,090	31%	**35%**	8%	19%	3%	4%	4
11–12 Sep	YouGov/Sunday Times	1,900	32%	**35%**	7%	15%	6%	6%	3
10–11 Sep	Populus	2,010	33%	**37%**	9%	13%	2%	4%	4
10–11 Sep	YouGov/TheSun	2,068	31%	**35%**	7%	16%	5%	6%	4
9–11 Sep	Opinium/The Observer	1,960	29%	**37%**	7%	19%	4%	5%	8
9–10 Sep	YouGov/The Sun	2,122	32%	**38%**	6%	14%	5%	5%	6
8–9 Sep	YouGov/TheSun	2,099	30%	**36%**	8%	16%	5%	5%	6
6–9 Sep	Ipsos MORI	1,010	**34%**	33%	7%	15%	6%	5%	1
7–8 Sep	YouGov/The Sun	1,724	31%	**36%**	8%	16%	5%	4%	5
5–7 Sep	Lord Ashcroft	1,001	28%	**35%**	8%	18%	6%	5%	7
5–7 Sep	Populus	2,058	34%	**36%**	9%	12%	4%	6%	2
4–5 Sep	YouGov/Sunday Times	1,961	33%	**35%**	7%	15%	4%	5%	2
3–4 Sep	Populus	2,026	32%	**38%**	8%	14%	4%	4%	6
3–4 Sep	YouGov/The Sun	2,043	32%	**36%**	7%	16%	5%	4%	4
2–3 Sep	YouGov/The Sun	2,103	33%	**36%**	7%	14%	5%	5%	3
1–2 Sep	YouGov/The Sun	2,068	32%	**35%**	8%	15%	5%	4%	3
31 Aug – 1 Sep	YouGov/The Sun	1,704	34%	**35%**	7%	14%	5%	6%	1
29–31 Aug	ComRes/Independent	1,001	28%	**35%**	9%	17%	6%	5%	7
29–31 Aug	Populus	2,010	32%	**36%**	9%	15%	3%	5%	4
28–29 Aug	YouGov/Sunday Times	2,010	32%	**36%**	7%	16%	4%	4%	4
26–29 Aug	Opinium/The Observer	1,974	30%	**36%**	7%	16%	4%	7%	6
27–28 Aug	Populus	2,006	**35%**	34%	8%	13%	5%	4%	1
27–28 Aug	YouGov/The Sun	2,046	33%	**36%**	7%	13%	5%	6%	3
26–27 Aug	YouGov/The Sun	2,129	34%	**35%**	7%	14%	6%	5%	1
25–26 Aug	YouGov/The Sun	2,021	33%	**37%**	8%	13%	5%	5%	4
22–25 Aug	Populus	2,062	32%	**38%**	8%	15%	3%	4%	6
21–22 Aug	YouGov/Sunday Times	1,866	34%	**36%**	8%	14%	5%	3%	2
20–22 Aug	ComRes/Sunday Mirror, Independent on Sunday	2,058	32%	**34%**	8%	18%	3%	5%	2
20–21 Aug	Populus	2,065	33%	**39%**	9%	11%	3%	4%	6
20–21 Aug	YouGov/The Sun	2,028	33%	**38%**	8%	12%	5%	4%	5
19–20 Aug	YouGov/The Sun	2,070	34%	**38%**	9%	11%	4%	4%	4
18–19 Aug	YouGov/The Sun	2,036	36%	**37%**	9%	12%	3%	3%	1
17–18 Aug	YouGov/The Sun	1,710	33%	**38%**	8%	12%	4%	4%	5
15–17 Aug	Populus	2,049	32%	**37%**	9%	14%	3%	5%	5
14–15 Aug	YouGov/Sunday Times	2,019	34%	**38%**	7%	13%	4%	4%	4
12–15 Aug	Opinium/The Observer	1,963	28%	**32%**	10%	21%	4%	6%	4
13–14 Aug	Populus	2,018	32%	**35%**	9%	14%	5%	7%	3
13–14 Aug	YouGov/The Sun	1,984	**35%**	**35%**	8%	12%	5%	5%	Tie
12–13 Aug	YouGov/The Sun	2,116	34%	**36%**	10%	12%	4%	5%	2
11–12 Aug	YouGov/The Sun	1,942	35%	**38%**	8%	11%	4%	3%	3
10–11 Aug	YouGov/The Sun	1,676	33%	**37%**	8%	12%	5%	4%	4
9–11 Aug	Ipsos MORI	1,003	**33%**	**33%**	7%	13%	7%	6%	Tie
8–11 Aug	Populus	2,031	33%	**37%**	9%	12%	3%	5%	4
8–10 Aug	ICM/The Guardian	1,002	31%	**38%**	12%	10%	4%	5%	7
7–8 Aug	YouGov/Sunday Times	1,943	33%	**37%**	8%	13%	4%	4%	4
6–7 Aug	Populus	2,050	**36%**	35%	9%	11%	3%	5%	1
6–7 Aug	YouGov/The Sun	2,016	33%	**38%**	7%	12%	4%	5%	5
5–6 Aug	YouGov/The Sun	1,944	34%	**37%**	9%	12%	4%	4%	3
4–5 Aug	YouGov/The Sun	1,977	33%	**38%**	8%	12%	4%	5%	5
3–4 Aug	YouGov/The Sun	1,617	34%	**38%**	6%	13%	4%	5%	4
1–3 Aug	Lord Ashcroft	1,002	30%	**33%**	8%	18%	6%	5%	3
1–3 Aug	Populus	2,021	35%	**37%**	9%	12%	3%	4%	2
31 Jul – 1 Aug	YouGov/Sunday Times	2,083	35%	**38%**	7%	12%	4%	4%	3
29 Jul – 1 Aug	Opinium/The Observer	1,979	32%	**35%**	7%	15%	5%	7%	3
30–31 Jul	Populus	2,027	35%	**36%**	8%	13%	4%	4%	1
30–31 Jul	YouGov/The Sun	2,023	34%	**38%**	8%	13%	4%	3%	4
29–30 Jul	YouGov/The Sun	2,100	35%	**37%**	8%	12%	4%	4%	2
28–29 Jul	YouGov/The Sun	2,004	34%	**35%**	8%	12%	6%	5%	1
27–28 Jul	YouGov/The Sun	1,658	33%	**39%**	8%	12%	4%	4%	6
25–27 Jul	ComRes/Independent	1,001	27%	**33%**	8%	17%	7%	6%	6
25–27 Jul	Lord Ashcroft	1,000	32%	**34%**	9%	14%	6%	5%	2
25–27 Jul	Populus	2,024	33%	**37%**	9%	12%	4%	5%	4
24–25 Jul	YouGov/Sunday Times	1,741	35%	**36%**	8%	13%	5%	3%	1
23–24 Jul	Populus	2,035	35%	**37%**	9%	9%	4%	6%	2
23–24 Jul	YouGov/The Sun	2,065	35%	**38%**	8%	11%	4%	4%	3
22–23 Jul	YouGov/The Sun	1,897	34%	**38%**	8%	12%	4%	4%	4
21–22 Jul	YouGov/The Sun	1,904	34%	**37%**	7%	14%	5%	4%	3
20–21 Jul	YouGov/The Sun	2,107	34%	**38%**	9%	11%	4%	5%	4
18–20 Jul	Lord Ashcroft	1,007	27%	**35%**	7%	17%	7%	7%	8
18–20 Jul	Populus	2,035	32%	**37%**	9%	13%	4%	5%	5
17–18 Jul	YouGov/Sunday Times	2,078	32%	**37%**	9%	13%	5%	4%	5
16–18 Jul	ComRes/Independent on Sunday, Sunday Mirror	2,054	31%	**34%**	9%	17%	4%	5%	3
16–17 Jul	Populus	2,007	**35%**	**35%**	8%	14%	3%	5%	Tie
16–17 Jul	YouGov/The Sun	2,038	32%	**39%**	8%	13%	4%	4%	7
15–17 Jul	TNS BMRB	1,191	29%	**36%**	7%	19%	9%		7
15–17 Jul	Opinium/The Observer	1,967	30%	**34%**	9%	17%	4%	5%	4
15–16 Jul	YouGov/The Sun	2,107	33%	**36%**	9%	13%	4%	4%	3
14–15 Jul	YouGov/The Sun	2,072	34%	**38%**	6%	13%	4%	5%	4
12–15 Jul	Ipsos MORI	1,000	32%	**35%**	8%	12%	8%	5%	3
13–14 Jul	YouGov/The Sun	1,745	35%	**38%**	8%	10%	4%	5%	3
11–13 Jul	ICM/The Guardian	1,000	**34%**	33%	12%	9%	4%	7%	1
11–13 Jul	Lord Ashcroft	1,000	32%	**36%**	7%	14%	6%	6%	4
11–13 Jul	Populus	2,055	34%	**37%**	9%	12%	5%	3%	3
10–11 Jul	YouGov/Sunday Times	1,963	33%	**38%**	9%	12%	4%	4%	5
9–10 Jul	Populus	2,052	34%	**36%**	8%	12%	3%	7%	2
9–10 Jul	YouGov/The Sun	2,022	34%	**37%**	8%	12%	5%	4%	3
8–9 Jul	YouGov/The Sun	2,034	32%	**36%**	10%	12%	5%	4%	4
7–8 Jul	YouGov/The Sun	2,072	31%	**38%**	8%	12%	5%	6%	7
6–7 Jul	YouGov/The Sun	1,650	34%	**37%**	9%	13%	4%	3%	3
4–6 Jul	Lord Ashcroft	1,005	27%	**34%**	11%	15%	6%	7%	7
4–6 Jul	Populus	2,053	31%	**38%**	9%	14%	4%	4%	7
3–4 Jul	YouGov/Sunday Times	2,095	34%	**36%**	8%	13%	5%	4%	2
2–3 Jul	Populus	2,029	34%	**35%**	9%	14%	4%	4%	1
2–3 Jul	YouGov/The Sun	1,611	35%	**36%**	8%	12%	4%	4%	1
1–3 Jul	Opinium/The Observer	1,946	29%	**35%**	7%	18%	5%	6%	6
1–2 Jul	YouGov/The Sun	1,991	35%	**37%**	8%	12%	5%	3%	2
30 Jun – 1 Jul	YouGov/The Sun	2,073	33%	**38%**	8%	11%	5%	5%	5
29–30 Jun	YouGov/The Sun	1,729	35%	**37%**	8%	12%	3%	5%	2
27–29 Jun	ComRes/Independent	1,005	30%	**32%**	7%	18%	5%	8%	2
27–29 Jun	Populus	2,049	33%	**37%**	10%	12%	4%	4%	4
27–29 Jun	Lord Ashcroft	1,006	**33%**	31%	9%	15%	6%	6%	2
27 Jun	Survation/Mail on Sunday	1,000	27%	**36%**	7%	22%	5%	3%	9
26–27 Jun	YouGov/Sunday Times	1,936	33%	**37%**	8%	14%	5%	3%	4
25–26 Jun	Populus	2,021	34%	**35%**	8%	13%	5%	5%	1
25–26 Jun	YouGov/The Sun	1,996	33%	**38%**	8%	13%	4%	4%	5
24–25 Jun	YouGov/The Sun	2,044	32%	**37%**	7%	14%	5%	5%	5
23–24 Jun	YouGov/The Sun	1,984	33%	**36%**	8%	15%	4%	4%	3
22–23 Jun	YouGov/The Sun	1,652	32%	**36%**	9%	15%	4%	4%	4
20–22 Jun	Lord Ashcroft	1,006	28%	**33%**	9%	17%	7%	6%	5
20–22 Jun	Populus	2,062	32%	**37%**	9%	13%	3%	5%	5
19–20 Jun	YouGov/Sunday Times	2,016	32%	**38%**	8%	14%	5%	4%	6
18–19 Jun	Populus	2,032	34%	**36%**	8%	13%	3%	6%	2
18–19 Jun	YouGov/The Sun	2,097	33%	**37%**	8%	15%	3%	4%	4
17–19 Jun	Opinium/The Observer	1,946	31%	**35%**	7%	17%	5%	5%	4
17–18 Jun	YouGov/The Sun	2,066	34%	**38%**	7%	13%	5%	3%	4
16–17 Jun	YouGov/The Sun	1,897	34%	**37%**	7%	13%	4%	6%	3
14–17 Jun	Ipsos MORI	1,001	31%	**34%**	8%	14%	8%	5%	3
15–16 Jun	YouGov/The Sun	1,696	32%	**36%**	10%	14%	5%	4%	4
13–15 Jun	ICM/The Guardian	1,001	31%	**32%**	10%	16%	6%	5%	1
13–15 Jun	Lord Ashcroft	1,001	29%	**35%**	8%	15%	6%	7%	6
13–15 Jun	Populus	2,036	33%	**37%**	9%	13%	4%	4%	4
12–13 Jun	YouGov/Sunday Times	2,106	33%	**37%**	8%	13%	5%	4%	4
11–13 Jun	ComRes/Independent on Sunday, Sunday Mirror	2,034	32%	**34%**	7%	18%	4%	5%	2
11–12 Jun	YouGov/The Sun on Sunday	2,337	33%	**36%**	8%	14%	5%	4%	3
11–12 Jun	Populus	2,051	32%	**35%**	8%	15%	5%	5%	3
11–12 Jun	YouGov/The Sun	2,183	32%	**38%**	8%	12%	5%	5%	6
10–12 Jun	TNS BMRB	1,195	29%	**35%**	6%	23%	7%		6
10–11 Jun	YouGov/The Sun	2,157	34%	**36%**	6%	14%	5%	5%	2
9–10 Jun	YouGov/The Sun	1,974	35%	**37%**	8%	12%	3%	5%	2
8–9 Jun	YouGov/The Sun	1,685	31%	**37%**	7%	15%	5%	5%	6
6–8 Jun	Lord Ashcroft	1,003	28%	**32%**	8%	17%	7%	8%	4
6–8 Jun	Populus	2,039	35%	**36%**	9%	14%	3%	4%	1
5–6 Jun	YouGov/Sunday Times	2,134	33%	**37%**	7%	14%	5%	4%	4
4–6 Jun	Populus	2,006	34%	**35%**	9%	14%	5%	4%	1
5 Jun	Newark by-election (Con hold)								
4–5 Jun	YouGov/The Sun	2,107	31%	**37%**	8%	15%	5%	4%	6
3–5 Jun	Opinium/The Observer	1,950	31%	**35%**	6%	19%	4%	5%	4
3–4 Jun	YouGov/The Sun	1,951	32%	**37%**	7%	13%	5%	5%	5
2–3 Jun	YouGov/The Sun	1,962	32%	**36%**	8%	14%	5%	4%	4
1–2 Jun	YouGov/The Sun	1,740	30%	**36%**	8%	17%	5%	4%	6
30 May – 1 Jun	Lord Ashcroft	1,000	25%	**34%**	6%	19%	7%	8%	9
30 May – 1 Jun	Populus	2,062	32%	**37%**	10%	13%	3%	5%	5
29–30 May	YouGov/Sunday Times	2,090	33%	**36%**	7%	15%	4%	5%	3
28–29 May	Populus	2,010	34%	**35%**	9%	14%	4%	4%	1
28–29 May	YouGov/The Sun	2,123	31%	**38%**	7%	16%	4%	5%	7
27–28 May	YouGov/The Sun	2,109	32%	**36%**	9%	14%	5%	5%	4
26–27 May	YouGov/The Sun	2,079	32%	**34%**	8%	15%	5%	5%	2
23–26 May	Populus	2,060	34%	**36%**	9%	14%	3%	4%	2
23–25 May	Lord Ashcroft	1,000	29%	**31%**	8%	17%	7%	10%	2
22–26 May	European Parliament election								
23 May	Survation/Mail on Sunday	1,017	27%	**32%**	9%	23%	3%	6%	5
22–23 May	YouGov/Sunday Times	1,898	34%	**35%**	9%	13%	5%	5%	1
20–23 May	Opinium/The Observer	1,968	32%	**33%**	7%	19%	4%	5%	1
22 May	Local elections in England and Northern Ireland								
21–22 May	Populus	2,045	34%	**36%**	9%	14%	3%	4%	2
21–22 May	YouGov/The Sun	1,922	**34%**	**34%**	9%	14%	5%	4%	Tie
20–21 May	YouGov/The Times, The Sun	6,124	33%	**36%**	9%	13%	4%	5%	3
19–20 May	Survation/Daily Mirror	1,106	28%	**34%**	9%	20%	3%	6%	6
19–20 May	YouGov/The Sun	1,874	33%	**35%**	11%	13%	3%	5%	2
18–19 May	YouGov/The Sun	1,740	33%	**37%**	9%	11%	6%	4%	4
16–18 May	ComRes/Independent	1,008	30%	**35%**	8%	14%	5%	8%	5
16–18 May	Lord Ashcroft	1,006	29%	**35%**	9%	14%	5%	7%	6
16–18 May	Populus	2,026	**35%**	34%	8%	14%	3%	6%	1
15–16 May	YouGov/Sunday Times	1,892	34%	**37%**	9%	13%	4%	3%	3
14–15 May	ComRes/Independent on Sunday, Sunday Mirror	2,045	29%	**33%**	8%	19%	4%	7%	4
14–15 May	YouGov/The Sun	2,083	34%	**36%**	8%	13%	4%	5%	2
14–15 May	Populus	2,043	32%	**36%**	10%	13%	3%	6%	4
13–14 May	YouGov/The Sun	1,968	32%	**35%**	10%	13%	4%	5%	3
12–13 May	YouGov/The Sun	1,977	**34%**	**34%**	8%	15%	3%	5%	Tie
11–12 May	YouGov/The Sun	1,680	35%	**36%**	9%	14%	3%	5%	1
10–12 May	Ipsos MORI/Evening Standard	1,003	31%	**34%**	9%	11%	8%	7%	3
9–11 May	ICM/The Guardian	1,000	**33%**	31%	13%	15%	4%	5%	2
9–11 May	Lord Ashcroft	1,001	**34%**	32%	9%	15%	5%	6%	2
9–11 May	Populus	2,056	35%	**36%**	8%	13%	3%	5%	1
9 May	Survation/Mail on Sunday	1,005	28%	**33%**	10%	20%	3%	6%	5
8–9 May	YouGov/Sunday Times	1,905	31%	**38%**	9%	13%	4%	5%	7
7–8 May	Populus	2,006	32%	**36%**	8%	16%	4%	5%	4
7–8 May	YouGov/The Sun	1,875	34%	**35%**	8%	13%	4%	6%	1
6–8 May	Opinium/The Observer	1,997	29%	**33%**	9%	20%	4%	5%	4
6–7 May	YouGov/The Sun	1,858	34%	**37%**	8%	13%	3%	5%	3
5–6 May	YouGov/The Sun	1,933	34%	**35%**	9%	14%	3%	5%	1
2–5 May	Populus	2,034	33%	**36%**	8%	14%	4%	5%	3
2–3 May	Survation/Daily Mirror	1,005	33%	**34%**	8%	18%	4%	3%	1
1–2 May	YouGov/Sunday Times	1,945	33%	**36%**	9%	15%	4%	3%	3
30 Apr – 1 May	YouGov/The Sun on Sunday	1,844	33%	**36%**	10%	15%	2%	4%	3
30 Apr – 1 May	Populus	2,060	34%	**35%**	9%	14%	3%	5%	1
30 Apr – 1 May	YouGov/The Sun	1,813	33%	**36%**	10%	14%	3%	4%	3
2 Apr – 1 May	Populus/Financial Times	18,448	34%	**36%**	10%	13%	3%	4%	2
29–30 Apr	YouGov/The Sun	1,898	31%	**37%**	9%	15%	3%	5%	6
28–29 Apr	YouGov/The Sun	1,804	32%	**37%**	9%	14%	3%	5%	5
27–28 Apr	YouGov/The Sun	1,629	32%	**37%**	10%	15%	2%	4%	5
25–27 Apr	Populus	2,052	32%	**35%**	10%	15%	3%	5%	3
24–25 Apr	YouGov/Sunday Times	1,835	31%	**36%**	9%	15%	4%	5%	5
22–25 Apr	Opinium/The Observer	1,965	32%	**34%**	7%	18%	3%	6%	2
23–24 Apr	Populus	2,055	**35%**	**35%**	9%	13%	3%	5%	Tie
23–24 Apr	YouGov/The Sun	2,072	32%	**38%**	8%	14%	4%	4%	6
22–23 Apr	YouGov/The Sun	2,143	32%	**37%**	10%	15%	2%	4%	5
21–22 Apr	YouGov/The Sun	2,190	34%	**37%**	10%	12%	2%	5%	3
17–21 Apr	Populus	2,049	33%	**36%**	10%	13%	3%	4%	3
16–17 Apr	YouGov/The Sun	1,884	33%	**35%**	11%	15%	2%	4%	2
15–16 Apr	Populus	2,069	34%	**35%**	9%	14%	3%	5%	1
15–16 Apr	YouGov/The Sun	2,166	33%	**39%**	9%	11%	3%	5%	6
14–15 Apr	YouGov/The Sun	2,162	34%	**37%**	10%	13%	2%	4%	3
13–14 Apr	YouGov/The Sun	1,541	33%	**38%**	9%	12%	3%	5%	5
11–13 Apr	ComRes/The Independent	1,000	30%	**36%**	9%	12%	4%	9%	6
11–13 Apr	ICM/The Guardian	1,000	32%	**37%**	12%	11%	2%	6%	5
11–13 Apr	Populus	2,011	33%	**35%**	11%	13%	2%	6%	2
10–11 Apr	YouGov/Sunday Times	2,036	32%	**38%**	8%	14%	2%	6%	6
9–10 Apr	ComRes/Independent on Sunday, Sunday Mirror	2,003	29%	**35%**	7%	20%	4%	5%	6
9–10 Apr	Populus	2,051	34%	**35%**	11%	12%	2%	6%	1
9–10 Apr	YouGov/The Sun	2,111	32%	**38%**	8%	14%	2%	5%	6
8–10 Apr	Opinium/The Observer	1,972	30%	**36%**	7%	18%	3%	6%	6
8–9 Apr	YouGov/The Sun	2,061	33%	**36%**	10%	14%	2%	5%	3
7–8 Apr	YouGov/The Sun	2,144	33%	**37%**	10%	13%	2%	4%	4
6–7 Apr	YouGov/The Sun	1,748	33%	**36%**	10%	14%	2%	5%	3
5–7 Apr	Ipsos MORI/Evening Standard	1,002	31%	**37%**	9%	15%	3%	4%	6
4–6 Apr	Populus	2,034	34%	**37%**	9%	14%	3%	4%	3
4 Apr	Survation/Mail on Sunday	1,001	29%	**36%**	10%	20%	2%	4%	7
3–4 Apr	YouGov/Sunday Times	1,998	34%	**39%**	9%	12%	2%	4%	5
2–3 Apr	Populus	2,067	33%	**37%**	10%	13%	2%	5%	4
2–3 Apr	YouGov/The Sun	2,076	32%	**38%**	10%	13%	3%	4%	6
1–2 Apr	YouGov/The Sun	2,148	32%	**38%**	10%	13%	2%	5%	6
31 Mar – 1 Apr	YouGov/The Sun	1,981	33%	**37%**	10%	12%	2%	6%	4
30–31 Mar	YouGov/The Sun	1,696	34%	**37%**	11%	13%	2%	5%	3
28–30 Mar	Populus	2,008	34%	**37%**	10%	11%	3%	5%	3
5–30 Mar	Populus/Financial Times	16,424	34%	**37%**	9%	12%	3%	5%	3
27–28 Mar	YouGov/Sunday Times	1,916	33%	**40%**	9%	11%	2%	5%	7
27–28 Mar	Populus	2,066	35%	**37%**	8%	12%	3%	5%	2
25–28 Mar	Opinium/The Observer	1,936	32%	**33%**	10%	15%	3%	7%	1
26–27 Mar	YouGov/The Sun	2,039	35%	**36%**	10%	11%	3%	4%	1
25–26 Mar	YouGov/The Sun	2,070	35%	**37%**	9%	11%	2%	5%	2
24–25 Mar	YouGov/The Sun	1,958	35%	**38%**	10%	10%	2%	5%	3
23–24 Mar	YouGov/The Sun	1,558	36%	**38%**	10%	10%	2%	4%	2
21–23 Mar	ComRes/Independent	1,024	31%	**36%**	9%	11%	5%	8%	5
21–23 Mar	Populus	2,039	34%	**35%**	10%	13%	2%	6%	1
20–21 Mar	YouGov/Sunday Times	2,103	36%	**37%**	9%	11%	2%	5%	1
20–21 Mar	Survation/Mail on Sunday	1,000	34%	**35%**	9%	15%	2%	5%	1
19–20 Mar	Populus	2,122	34%	**38%**	9%	12%	2%	5%	4
19–20 Mar	YouGov/The Sun	1,904	34%	**39%**	10%	10%	2%	5%	5
18–19 Mar	YouGov/The Sun	2,088	33%	**38%**	11%	11%	3%	4%	5
17–18 Mar	YouGov/The Sun	2,284	34%	**38%**	11%	11%	3%	4%	4
16–17 Mar	YouGov/The Sun	1,919	32%	**40%**	9%	11%	3%	4%	8
14–16 Mar	Populus	2,053	32%	**36%**	10%	13%	3%	6%	4
13–14 Mar	YouGov/Sunday Times	1,946	33%	**40%**	8%	12%	2%	4%	7
12–13 Mar	ComRes/Independent on Sunday/Sunday Mirror	2,001	32%	**35%**	9%	16%	3%	5%	3
12–13 Mar	Populus	2,053	34%	**35%**	10%	13%	2%	6%	1
12–13 Mar	YouGov/The Sun	2,098	33%	**38%**	11%	10%	2%	6%	5
11–12 Mar	Opinium/The Observer	1,971	30%	**35%**	10%	16%	3%	6%	5
11–12 Mar	YouGov/The Sun	2,095	35%	**37%**	9%	13%	2%	4%	2
8–12 Mar	Ipsos MORI/Evening Standard	1,000	32%	**35%**	13%	11%	5%	4%	3
10–11 Mar	YouGov/The Sun	2,040	34%	**38%**	10%	12%	2%	4%	4
7–11 Mar	ICM/The Guardian	1,003	35%	**38%**	12%	9%	3%	3%	3
9–10 Mar	YouGov/The Sun	3,195	32%	**39%**	8%	13%	3%	5%	7
7–9 Mar	Populus	2,058	34%	**38%**	9%	12%	3%	4%	4
6–7 Mar	YouGov/Sunday Times	2,029	32%	**39%**	10%	14%	2%	3%	7
5–6 Mar	Populus	2,025	34%	**37%**	9%	12%	3%	5%	3
5–6 Mar	YouGov/The Sun	1,833	31%	**40%**	9%	13%	3%	4%	9
4–5 Mar	YouGov/The Sun	1,868	34%	**37%**	10%	11%	3%	5%	3
3–4 Mar	YouGov/The Sun	2,041	34%	**38%**	9%	13%	2%	4%	4
2–3 Mar	YouGov/The Sun	1,868	32%	**41%**	8%	12%	1%	6%	9
28 Feb – 2 Mar	ComRes/Independent	1,004	30%	**38%**	10%	11%	4%	7%	8
28 Feb – 2 Mar	Populus	2,055	34%	**37%**	10%	12%	3%	4%	3
27–28 Feb	YouGov/Sunday Times	2,098	33%	**38%**	9%	13%	2%	5%	5
25–28 Feb	Opinium/The Observer	1,946	29%	**34%**	10%	19%	3%	5%	5
26–27 Feb	Populus	1,131	33%	**38%**	9%	13%	3%	5%	5
5–27 Feb	Populus/Financial Times	14,203	33%	**37%**	10%	14%	3%	3%	4
26–27 Feb	YouGov/The Sun	1,868	34%	**39%**	8%	12%	3%	4%	5
25–26 Feb	YouGov/The Sun	2,062	34%	**40%**	10%	11%	3%	4%	6
24–25 Feb	YouGov/The Sun	1,936	33%	**39%**	10%	11%	3%	4%	6
23–24 Feb	YouGov/The Sun	1,773	33%	**38%**	10%	13%	2%	5%	5
21–23 Feb	Populus	2,052	32%	**37%**	10%	15%	2%	4%	5
20–21 Feb	YouGov/Sunday Times	2,141	32%	**39%**	8%	12%	2%	6%	7
19–20 Feb	Populus	2,066	32%	**38%**	9%	13%	3%	5%	6
19–20 Feb	YouGov/The Sun	1,756	34%	**39%**	9%	12%	2%	4%	5
18–19 Feb	YouGov/The Sun	1,766	33%	**37%**	10%	12%	3%	5%	4
17–18 Feb	YouGov/The Sun	1,758	33%	**40%**	8%	12%	3%	4%	7
16–17 Feb	YouGov/The Sun	1,645	33%	**40%**	9%	11%	2%	5%	7
14–16 Feb	Populus	2,031	33%	**38%**	10%	13%	3%	3%	5
13–14 Feb	YouGov/Sunday Times	1,868	32%	**39%**	9%	12%	3%	6%	7
11–14 Feb	Opinium/The Observer	1,969	28%	**37%**	8%	17%	2%	8%	9
13 Feb	Wythenshawe and Sale East by-election (Lab hold)								
12–13 Feb	Populus	2,015	32%	**38%**	9%	14%	3%	4%	6
12–13 Feb	ComRes/The Independent on Sunday/Sunday Mirror	2,031	32%	**37%**	9%	15%	2%	5%	5
12–13 Feb	YouGov/The Sun	1,896	33%	**39%**	9%	12%	2%	5%	6
11–12 Feb	YouGov/The Sun	1,826	32%	**39%**	8%	13%	2%	6%	7
10–11 Feb	YouGov/The Sun	1,899	34%	**39%**	10%	11%	2%	4%	5
9–10 Feb	YouGov/The Sun	1,685	33%	**39%**	10%	12%	2%	4%	6
7–9 Feb	ICM/The Guardian	1,002	34%	**38%**	10%	11%	3%	5%	4
7–9 Feb	Populus	2,013	34%	**36%**	11%	12%	3%	4%	2
6–7 Feb	YouGov/Sunday Times	1,521	35%	**39%**	10%	10%	3%	3%	4
5–6 Feb	Populus	2,015	33%	**36%**	9%	15%	2%	5%	3
5–6 Feb	YouGov/The Sun	1,911	32%	**38%**	10%	14%	2%	4%	6
4–5 Feb	YouGov/The Sun	1,902	35%	**39%**	9%	10%	2%	4%	4
3–4 Feb	YouGov/The Sun	1,942	33%	**39%**	8%	13%	3%	4%	6
2–3 Feb	YouGov/The Sun	1,741	33%	**38%**	11%	11%	1%	6%	5
1–3 Feb	Ipsos MORI/Evening Standard	1,012	31%	**38%**	12%	10%	3%	6%	7
31 Jan – 2 Feb	Populus	2,043	32%	**41%**	11%	9%	3%	4%	9
30–31 Jan	YouGov/Sunday Times	1,885	34%	**39%**	8%	11%	3%	5%	5
28–31 Jan	Opinium/The Observer	1,972	29%	**36%**	8%	17%	3%	6%	7
29–30 Jan	Populus	2,044	32%	**39%**	11%	10%	3%	4%	7
29–30 Jan	YouGov/The Sun	1,942	32%	**42%**	8%	12%	2%	4%	10
28–29 Jan	YouGov/The Sun	1,884	35%	**38%**	10%	11%	2%	4%	3
27–28 Jan	YouGov/The Sun	1,814	34%	**37%**	9%	12%	3%	5%	3
26–27 Jan	YouGov/The Sun	1,381	35%	**37%**	9%	13%	2%	5%	2
24–26 Jan	ComRes/Independent	1,002	32%	**33%**	9%	14%	5%	7%	1
24–26 Jan	Populus	2,052	33%	**40%**	11%	8%	3%	5%	7
23–24 Jan	YouGov/Sunday Times	1,859	32%	**39%**	9%	13%	2%	5%	7
22–23 Jan	Populus	2,051	32%	**40%**	11%	9%	3%	5%	8
22–23 Jan	YouGov/The Sun	1,840	35%	**38%**	8%	12%	2%	5%	3
21–22 Jan	YouGov/The Sun	1,843	32%	**40%**	8%	12%	3%	5%	8
20–21 Jan	YouGov/The Sun	1,961	34%	**38%**	9%	13%	3%	3%	4
19–20 Jan	YouGov/The Sun	1,682	32%	**40%**	11%	12%	2%	3%	8
7–20 Jan	Lord Ashcroft	20,058	30%	**38%**	8%	16%	3%	5%	8
17–19 Jan	Populus	2,027	32%	**39%**	12%	9%	3%	5%	7
16–17 Jan	YouGov/Sunday Times	1,957	33%	**39%**	8%	13%	2%	5%	6
15–16 Jan	ComRes/Sunday Mirror/Independent	2,029	30%	**35%**	8%	19%	3%	5%	5
15–16 Jan	Populus	2,039	33%	**40%**	13%	9%	2%	3%	7
15–16 Jan	YouGov/The Sun	1,981	32%	**39%**	10%	12%	2%	5%	7
14–16 Jan	Opinium/The Observer	1,930	30%	**36%**	8%	17%	3%	6%	6
14–15 Jan	Survation/Sky News	1,005	30%	**34%**	12%	18%	2%	4%	4
14–15 Jan	YouGov/The Sun	1,893	33%	**39%**	10%	12%	2%	4%	6
13–14 Jan	YouGov/The Sun	2,000	34%	**37%**	9%	13%	2%	5%	3
11–14 Jan	Ipsos MORI/Evening Standard	1,035	30%	**39%**	13%	11%	3%	4%	9
12–13 Jan	YouGov/The Sun	1,762	33%	**38%**	11%	12%	2%	4%	5
10–12 Jan	ICM/The Guardian	1,005	32%	**35%**	14%	10%	3%	6%	3
10–11 Jan	Populus	2,079	33%	**38%**	12%	9%	3%	5%	5
9–10 Jan	YouGov/Sunday Times	1,904	31%	**40%**	9%	14%	2%	4%	9
8–9 Jan	Populus	2,012	33%	**40%**	11%	8%	3%	5%	7
8–9 Jan	YouGov/The Sun	1,887	32%	**38%**	9%	13%	2%	6%	6
7–8 Jan	YouGov/The Sun	1,958	32%	**38%**	9%	13%	3%	5%	6
6–7 Jan	YouGov/The Sun	1,972	32%	**37%**	10%	14%	3%	4%	5
5–6 Jan	YouGov/The Sun	1,729	32%	**40%**	9%	12%	2%	5%	8
3 Jan	Survation/Mail on Sunday	1,001	31%	**35%**	11%	16%	2%	5%	4
30 Dec 2013 – 2 Jan 2014	Opinium/The Observer	1,939	30%	**37%**	8%	17%	3%	5%	7

=== 2013 ===
Date(s) conducted	Polling organisation/client	Sample size	Con	Lab	LD	UKIP	Grn	Others	Lead
20–22 Dec	Populus	2,013	35%	37%	12%	9%	3%	4%	2
19–20 Dec	YouGov/Sunday Times	1,886	34%	40%	9%	11%	2%	4%	6
18–19 Dec	Populus	2,055	32%	40%	12%	8%	3%	5%	8
18–19 Dec	YouGov/The Sun	1,784	34%	39%	11%	12%	1%	3%	5
17–18 Dec	YouGov/The Sun	1,937	34%	38%	10%	11%	2%	5%	4
16–17 Dec	YouGov/The Sun	1,791	33%	41%	10%	11%	2%	3%	8
15–16 Dec	YouGov/The Sun	1,666	36%	38%	8%	11%	2%	5%	2
13–15 Dec	ComRes/Independent	1,003	32%	37%	9%	10%	5%	7%	5
13–15 Dec	Populus	2,058	33%	40%	13%	8%	2%	4%	7
12–13 Dec	YouGov/Sunday Times	1,846	32%	38%	9%	13%	2%	6%	6
11–13 Dec	ComRes/Sunday Mirror/Independent	2,027	29%	36%	8%	18%	4%	5%	7
10–13 Dec	Opinium/The Observer	1,949	30%	37%	8%	16%	4%	5%	7
11–12 Dec	Populus	2,024	33%	38%	13%	9%	3%	4%	5
11–12 Dec	YouGov/The Sun	1,902	35%	39%	9%	11%	2%	4%	4
10–11 Dec	YouGov/The Sun	1,916	33%	39%	9%	13%	2%	4%	6
9–10 Dec	YouGov/The Sun	1,852	34%	39%	9%	12%	2%	4%	5
8–9 Dec	YouGov/The Sun	1,766	33%	38%	10%	13%	2%	4%	5
7–9 Dec	Ipsos MORI/Evening Standard	1,011	33%	37%	9%	10%	5%	6%	4
6–8 Dec	ICM/The Guardian	1,001	32%	37%	12%	9%	3%	6%	5
6–8 Dec	Populus	2,027	33%	41%	11%	7%	3%	5%	8
5–6 Dec	YouGov/Sunday Times	1,802	34%	39%	10%	11%	3%	3%	5
4–5 Dec	Populus	2,038	34%	38%	13%	7%	3%	5%	4
4–5 Dec	YouGov/The Sun	1,833	29%	41%	9%	14%	2%	5%	12
3–4 Dec	YouGov/The Sun	1,943	34%	40%	10%	10%	3%	4%	6
2–3 Dec	YouGov/The Sun	1,935	32%	40%	9%	12%	3%	4%	8
1–2 Dec	YouGov/The Sun	1,699	32%	38%	10%	12%	2%	6%	6
29 Nov – 1 Dec	Populus	2,012	33%	40%	10%	9%	3%	5%	8
28–29 Nov	YouGov/Sunday Times	1,796	30%	38%	10%	15%	2%	5%	8
26–29 Nov	Opinium/The Observer	1,941	28%	35%	8%	19%	4%	6%	7
27–28 Nov	Populus	2,025	35%	38%	12%	7%	3%	5%	3
27–28 Nov	YouGov/The Sun	1,817	33%	39%	8%	14%	2%	4%	6
26–27 Nov	YouGov/The Sun	1,888	32%	39%	10%	13%	2%	4%	7
25–26 Nov	YouGov/The Sun	1,919	32%	39%	10%	12%	3%	4%	7
24–25 Nov	YouGov/The Sun	1,681	32%	40%	10%	12%	2%	4%	8
22–24 Nov	ComRes/Independent	1,002	32%	37%	9%	11%	3%	8%	5
22–24 Nov	Populus	2,075	34%	39%	12%	7%	2%	6%	5
21–22 Nov	Survation/Daily Star	1,006	29%	36%	10%	18%	3%	4%	7
21–22 Nov	YouGov/Sunday Times	1,867	33%	40%	9%	11%	2%	5%	7
20–21 Nov	Populus	2,028	33%	38%	11%	11%	2%	5%	5
20–21 Nov	YouGov/The Sun	1,909	32%	39%	10%	12%	2%	5%	7
19–20 Nov	YouGov/The Sun	1,865	32%	40%	9%	12%	3%	4%	8
18–19 Nov	YouGov/The Sun	2,108	34%	38%	10%	11%	2%	5%	4
17–18 Nov	YouGov/The Sun	1,650	32%	39%	11%	12%	2%	4%	7
15–17 Nov	Populus	2,010	32%	41%	10%	9%	2%	6%	9
14–15 Nov	YouGov/Sunday Times	1,851	33%	39%	10%	12%	2%	4%	6
13–15 Nov	ComRes/Sunday Mirror/Independent	2,023	29%	35%	10%	17%	5%	4%	6
13–14 Nov	Populus	2,051	31%	40%	11%	10%	3%	5%	9
13–14 Nov	YouGov/The Sun	1,765	32%	40%	10%	13%	2%	3%	8
12–14 Nov	Opinium/The Observer	1,946	28%	37%	9%	16%	4%	6%	9
12–13 Nov	YouGov/The Sun	1,998	31%	39%	9%	13%	2%	6%	8
11–12 Nov	YouGov/The Sun	2,032	32%	42%	8%	10%	3%	5%	10
10–11 Nov	YouGov/The Sun	1,752	33%	40%	9%	11%	3%	4%	7
9–11 Nov	Ipsos MORI/Evening Standard	1,019	32%	38%	8%	8%	7%	8%	6
7–11 Nov	TNS BMRB	1,210	30%	38%	8%	12%	4%	7%	8
8–10 Nov	ICM/The Guardian	1,004	30%	38%	13%	10%	3%	7%	8
8–10 Nov	Populus	2,053	31%	39%	11%	10%	3%	6%	8
4–10 Nov	Lord Ashcroft	8,053	30%	39%	8%	16%	3%	5%	9
7–8 Nov	YouGov/Sunday Times	1,878	34%	39%	10%	11%	2%	4%	5
6–7 Nov	Populus	2,019	32%	39%	12%	9%	3%	5%	7
6–7 Nov	YouGov/The Sun	1,806	33%	39%	10%	11%	2%	5%	6
5–6 Nov	YouGov/The Sun	1,825	33%	40%	9%	12%	3%	4%	7
4–5 Nov	YouGov/The Sun	1,876	34%	40%	8%	11%	2%	6%	6
3–4 Nov	YouGov/The Sun	1,747	33%	40%	9%	12%	2%	4%	7
1–3 Nov	Populus	2,014	34%	39%	10%	10%	3%	4%	5
25 Sep – 3 Nov	Populus	14,701	34%	39%	12%	9%	3%	3%	5
31 Oct – 1 Nov	YouGov/Sunday Times	1,885	32%	41%	8%	12%	2%	5%	9
29 Oct – 1 Nov	Opinium/The Observer	1,957	31%	37%	7%	16%	3%	6%	6
30–31 Oct	Populus	2,015	33%	40%	11%	9%	2%	5%	7
30–31 Oct	YouGov/The Sun	1,671	35%	39%	9%	10%	2%	5%	4
29–30 Oct	YouGov/The Sun	1,862	33%	40%	8%	11%	2%	6%	7
28–29 Oct	YouGov/The Sun	1,956	33%	39%	10%	11%	2%	5%	6
27–28 Oct	YouGov/The Sun	1,736	31%	40%	9%	12%	3%	5%	9
25–27 Oct	ComRes/Independent	1,003	28%	36%	11%	12%	5%	8%	8
25–27 Oct	Populus	2,065	33%	38%	12%	9%	3%	5%	5
25 Oct	Survation/Mail on Sunday	1,000	29%	35%	12%	17%	2%	5%	6
24–25 Oct	YouGov/Sunday Times	1,913	33%	39%	9%	12%	3%	5%	6
23–24 Oct	Populus	2,011	34%	39%	11%	10%	3%	3%	5
23–24 Oct	YouGov/The Sun	1,677	32%	38%	10%	13%	3%	5%	6
22–23 Oct	YouGov/The Sun	1,895	32%	39%	9%	11%	3%	5%	7
21–22 Oct	YouGov/The Sun	2,089	32%	40%	10%	13%	2%	3%	8
20–21 Oct	YouGov/The Sun	1,735	33%	38%	9%	13%	2%	4%	5
18–21 Oct	Survation/Free Speech Network	1,004	29%	37%	10%	16%	3%	4%	8
18–19 Oct	Populus	2,018	34%	37%	14%	8%	3%	4%	3
17–18 Oct	YouGov/Sunday Times	2,311	33%	39%	10%	11%	2%	5%	6
16–18 Oct	ComRes/Sunday Mirror/Independent	2,001	32%	35%	9%	16%	3%	5%	3
15–18 Oct	Opinium/The Observer	1,936	27%	38%	9%	17%	4%	4%	11
16–17 Oct	Populus	2,043	33%	39%	12%	9%	2%	5%	6
16–17 Oct	YouGov/The Sun	1,885	34%	40%	9%	11%	2%	4%	6
15–16 Oct	YouGov/The Sun	1,914	35%	39%	8%	12%	2%	3%	4
14–15 Oct	YouGov/The Sun	1,805	34%	39%	9%	11%	2%	5%	5
12–15 Oct	Ipsos MORI/Evening Standard	1,004	**35%**	35%	9%	10%	4%	7%	Tie
13–14 Oct	YouGov/The Sun	1,857	37%	38%	10%	10%	2%	3%	1
10–14 Oct	TNS BMRB	1,207	34%	36%	9%	13%	3%	5%	2
11–13 Oct	Populus	2,042	34%	39%	12%	8%	3%	4%	5
11–13 Oct	ICM/The Guardian	1,004	34%	38%	12%	8%	3%	5%	4
11 Oct	Survation/Mail on Sunday	1,017	27%	37%	11%	18%	2%	5%	10
10–11 Oct	YouGov/Sunday Times	1,773	34%	39%	9%	11%	3%	5%	5
9–10 Oct	Populus	2,013	34%	39%	12%	8%	3%	4%	5
9–10 Oct	YouGov/The Sun	1,859	33%	40%	10%	11%	2%	4%	7
8–9 Oct	YouGov/The Sun	1,907	32%	38%	11%	13%	3%	3%	6
7–8 Oct	YouGov/The Sun	1,879	33%	39%	10%	10%	3%	5%	6
6–7 Oct	YouGov/The Sun	1,655	35%	39%	9%	10%	3%	3%	4
4–6 Oct	Populus	2,050	33%	40%	10%	10%	3%	4%	7
3–4 Oct	YouGov/Sunday Times	1,985	33%	38%	11%	13%	2%	3%	5
1–4 Oct	Opinium/The Observer	1,948	31%	36%	7%	15%	4%	7%	5
2–3 Oct	Populus	2,014	33%	38%	11%	10%	3%	5%	5
2–3 Oct	YouGov/The Sun	1,883	35%	38%	9%	10%	2%	5%	3
1–2 Oct	YouGov/The Sun	1,765	34%	40%	9%	10%	3%	4%	6
30 Sep – 1 Oct	YouGov/The Sun	1,914	31%	41%	8%	12%	2%	5%	10
29–30 Sep	YouGov/The Sun	1,717	33%	39%	11%	13%	2%	3%	6
27–29 Sep	ComRes/Independent	1,001	33%	37%	11%	11%	3%	5%	4
27–29 Sep	Populus	2,006	36%	39%	11%	7%	3%	4%	3
26–27 Sep	YouGov/Sunday Times	1,895	31%	42%	9%	13%	2%	4%	11
25–26 Sep	Populus	2,015	34%	37%	12%	9%	2%	6%	3
25–26 Sep	YouGov/The Sun	1,840	33%	40%	9%	11%	2%	5%	7
24–25 Sep	YouGov/The Sun	1,919	32%	41%	8%	11%	3%	4%	9
23–24 Sep	YouGov/The Sun	1,905	34%	39%	10%	10%	3%	4%	5
22–23 Sep	YouGov/The Sun	1,763	32%	40%	10%	12%	2%	3%	8
14 Aug – 22 Sep	Populus	14,616	33%	38%	12%	9%	3%	5%	5
20–22 Sep	Populus	2,036	33%	39%	14%	9%	2%	3%	6
19–20 Sep	YouGov/Sunday Times	1,956	33%	37%	11%	11%	3%	5%	4
17–20 Sep	Opinium/The Observer	1,929	29%	36%	7%	17%	4%	7%	7
18–19 Sep	Populus	2,043	33%	39%	11%	9%	3%	5%	6
18–19 Sep	ComRes/Sunday Mirror/Independent	2,003	28%	36%	10%	17%	4%	5%	8
18–19 Sep	YouGov/The Sun	1,878	34%	35%	11%	11%	3%	5%	1
17–18 Sep	YouGov/The Sun	1,853	**36%**	36%	10%	12%	2%	4%	Tie
16–17 Sep	YouGov/The Sun	1,792	33%	37%	9%	13%	3%	4%	4
15–16 Sep	YouGov/The Sun	1,636	34%	37%	10%	12%	3%	5%	3
12–16 Sep	TNS BMRB	1,224	29%	39%	9%	14%	2%	7%	10
13–15 Sep	ICM/The Guardian	1,000	32%	36%	14%	9%	4%	5%	4
13–15 Sep	Populus	2,053	33%	40%	11%	9%	2%	5%	7
12–13 Sep	YouGov/Sunday Times	1,903	33%	38%	9%	12%	3%	5%	5
11–12 Sep	Populus	2,018	34%	41%	10%	7%	3%	5%	7
11–12 Sep	YouGov/The Sun	1,819	34%	38%	8%	13%	3%	5%	4
10–11 Sep	YouGov/The Sun	1,719	32%	39%	10%	12%	2%	4%	7
9–10 Sep	YouGov/The Sun	1,579	33%	39%	9%	11%	3%	5%	6
8–9 Sep	YouGov/The Sun	1,615	33%	38%	8%	14%	3%	4%	5
7–9 Sep	Ipsos MORI/Evening Standard	1,000	34%	37%	10%	11%	3%	5%	3
6–8 Sep	Populus	2,025	34%	37%	13%	9%	2%	5%	3
5–6 Sep	YouGov/Sunday Times	1,916	34%	38%	9%	12%	3%	4%	4
3–6 Sep	Opinium/The Observer	1,942	30%	35%	7%	17%	4%	7%	5
4–5 Sep	Populus	2,036	33%	37%	14%	8%	3%	4%	4
4–5 Sep	YouGov/The Sun	1,891	31%	38%	10%	13%	2%	6%	7
3–4 Sep	YouGov/The Sun	1,930	33%	39%	10%	12%	2%	5%	6
2–3 Sep	YouGov/The Sun	1,978	33%	37%	9%	13%	3%	5%	4
1–2 Sep	YouGov/The Sun	1,717	33%	40%	9%	12%	2%	5%	7
29 Aug – 2 Sep	TNS BMRB	1,230	28%	39%	11%	13%	3%	7%	11
30 Aug – 1 Sep	Lord Ashcroft	1,005	30%	35%	11%	14%	4%	6%	5
30 Aug – 1 Sep	ComRes/Independent	2,000	31%	37%	12%	10%	4%	6%	6
30 Aug – 1 Sep	Populus	2,020	34%	38%	12%	8%	3%	4%	4
30–31 Aug	YouGov/Sunday Times	1,822	31%	41%	9%	13%	2%	4%	10
30 Aug	Survation/Mail on Sunday	1,002	29%	37%	11%	17%	2%	5%	8
28–29 Aug	Populus	2,041	33%	39%	12%	9%	2%	5%	6
28–29 Aug	YouGov/The Sun	1,954	33%	37%	10%	12%	3%	5%	4
27–28 Aug	YouGov/The Sun	1,886	34%	37%	11%	12%	2%	5%	3
26–27 Aug	YouGov/The Sun	1,991	34%	39%	8%	12%	2%	5%	5
23–26 Aug	Populus	2,044	33%	37%	13%	10%	2%	5%	4
22–23 Aug	YouGov/Sunday Times	1,949	32%	38%	10%	13%	3%	5%	6
20–23 Aug	Opinium/The Observer	1,947	29%	36%	8%	18%	4%	5%	7
21–22 Aug	Populus	2,050	30%	38%	12%	12%	3%	5%	8
21–22 Aug	YouGov/The Sun	1,871	32%	39%	11%	10%	2%	5%	7
20–21 Aug	YouGov/The Sun	1,858	34%	37%	9%	13%	3%	4%	3
19–20 Aug	YouGov/The Sun	1,940	32%	39%	10%	12%	3%	4%	7
18–19 Aug	YouGov/The Sun	1,729	31%	38%	10%	14%	3%	6%	7
16–18 Aug	Populus	2,034	32%	38%	12%	11%	3%	4%	6
15–16 Aug	YouGov/Sunday Times	1,866	32%	38%	10%	13%	3%	5%	6
14–15 Aug	Populus	2,050	36%	39%	10%	8%	2%	5%	3
14–15 Aug	YouGov/The Sun	1,865	34%	39%	9%	11%	2%	5%	5
14–15 Aug	ComRes/Sunday Mirror/Independent	2,001	28%	37%	8%	19%	3%	5%	9
13–14 Aug	YouGov/The Sun	1,914	32%	38%	11%	13%	2%	4%	6
12–13 Aug	YouGov/The Sun	1,960	35%	38%	10%	11%	2%	5%	3
11–12 Aug	YouGov/The Sun	1,660	33%	40%	8%	13%	2%	5%	7
10–12 Aug	Ipsos MORI/Evening Standard	1,007	30%	40%	10%	11%	6%	3%	10
9–11 Aug	ICM/The Guardian	1,001	32%	35%	14%	10%	3%	5%	3
9–11 Aug	Populus	2,014	33%	39%	12%	10%	2%	4%	6
8–9 Aug	YouGov/Sunday Times	1,834	33%	41%	9%	10%	3%	4%	8
7–8 Aug	YouGov/The Sun	1,735	34%	38%	9%	12%	2%	5%	4
6–8 Aug	Opinium/The Observer	1,945	29%	36%	9%	17%	3%	6%	7
6–7 Aug	YouGov/The Sun	1,884	31%	39%	11%	11%	4%	4%	8
5–6 Aug	YouGov/The Sun	1,979	32%	39%	10%	11%	2%	5%	7
4–5 Aug	YouGov/The Sun	1,684	34%	38%	11%	12%	2%	5%	4
2–4 Aug	Populus	2,006	33%	38%	12%	9%	3%	5%	5
2 Aug	Survation/Mail on Sunday	1,001	28%	36%	11%	18%	1%	6%	8
1–2 Aug	YouGov/Sunday Times	1,952	32%	38%	10%	13%	2%	5%	6
31 Jul – 1 Aug	Populus	2,027	29%	40%	11%	12%	3%	5%	11
31 Jul – 1 Aug	YouGov/The Sun	1,995	34%	40%	10%	11%	3%	2%	6
30–31 Jul	YouGov/The Sun	1,869	33%	38%	10%	14%	2%	3%	5
29–30 Jul	YouGov/The Sun	1,869	34%	40%	11%	10%	2%	4%	6
28–29 Jul	YouGov/The Sun	1,751	33%	40%	10%	12%	2%	3%	7
26–28 Jul	Populus	2,049	34%	39%	11%	8%	3%	5%	5
25–27 Jul	ComRes/Independent	1,001	34%	37%	10%	12%	4%	4%	3
25–26 Jul	YouGov/Sunday Times	1,857	33%	39%	10%	11%	2%	5%	6
23–26 Jul	Opinium/The Observer	1,935	28%	39%	8%	16%	3%	6%	11
24–25 Jul	Populus	2,005	32%	39%	11%	10%	3%	5%	7
24–25 Jul	YouGov/The Sun	1,817	32%	38%	11%	11%	3%	5%	6
23–24 Jul	YouGov/The Sun	1,926	35%	39%	8%	11%	3%	4%	4
22–23 Jul	YouGov/The Sun	1,968	32%	39%	11%	12%	2%	4%	7
21–22 Jul	YouGov/The Sun	1,710	35%	38%	11%	10%	2%	4%	3
18–22 Jul	TNS BMRB	1,232	28%	38%	9%	16%	2%	7%	10
19–21 Jul	Populus	2,049	32%	39%	12%	9%	2%	6%	7
18–19 Jul	YouGov/Sunday Times	1,877	32%	39%	10%	11%	2%	5%	7
17–18 Jul	YouGov/The Sun	1,866	33%	38%	11%	11%	2%	5%	5
17–18 Jul	Populus	2,004	31%	39%	12%	10%	3%	4%	8
16–17 Jul	YouGov/The Sun	1,874	31%	37%	12%	13%	3%	5%	6
15–16 Jul	YouGov/The Sun	1,965	32%	38%	10%	12%	2%	6%	6
14–15 Jul	YouGov/The Sun	1,701	31%	40%	11%	11%	2%	7%	9
12–14 Jul	ICM/The Guardian	1,003	**36%**	36%	13%	7%	3%	5%	Tie
12–14 Jul	Populus	2,044	31%	38%	13%	10%	4%	4%	7
11–12 Jul	YouGov/Sunday Times	1,857	30%	41%	10%	13%	2%	4%	11
11–12 Jul	Survation/Mail on Sunday	1,006	28%	36%	9%	20%	4%	3%	8
10–12 Jul	Opinium/The Observer	1,951	27%	38%	6%	19%	4%	6%	11
10–11 Jul	ComRes/Sunday Mirror/Independent	2,021	28%	36%	8%	18%	4%	6%	8
9–10 Jul	YouGov/The Sun	1,955	32%	37%	11%	12%	3%	4%	5
8–9 Jul	YouGov/The Sun	1,938	31%	39%	10%	13%	3%	4%	8
7–8 Jul	YouGov/The Sun	1,938	34%	40%	10%	10%	2%	4%	6
4–5 Jul	YouGov/Sunday Times	1,660	33%	39%	11%	12%	2%	4%	6
3–4 Jul	YouGov/The Sun	1,792	31%	39%	11%	12%	2%	5%	8
3 Jul	Survation/Mirror	1,085	23%	36%	10%	22%	4%	5%	13
2–3 Jul	YouGov/The Sun	1,923	32%	40%	9%	13%	2%	4%	8
1–2 Jul	YouGov/The Sun	1,967	32%	40%	9%	12%	3%	4%	8
30 Jun – 1 Jul	YouGov/The Sun	1,620	33%	38%	8%	12%	2%	6%	5
27–28 Jun	YouGov/The Sunday Times	1,967	33%	38%	11%	11%	2%	5%	5
25–28 Jun	Opinium/The Observer	1,954	27%	37%	7%	19%	3%	7%	10
26–27 Jun	YouGov/The Sun	1,920	33%	39%	10%	13%	3%	2%	6
25–26 Jun	YouGov/The Sun	1,915	31%	42%	11%	10%	3%	4%	11
24–25 Jun	YouGov/The Sun	1,860	32%	40%	11%	11%	2%	4%	8
23–24 Jun	YouGov/The Sun	1,694	32%	39%	9%	12%	3%	4%	7
21–23 Jun	ComRes/Independent	1,000	30%	36%	10%	14%	5%	4%	6
20–21 Jun	YouGov/Sunday Times	1,916	31%	39%	10%	13%	3%	4%	8
19–20 Jun	YouGov/The Sun	1,872	31%	39%	11%	14%	2%	3%	8
18–19 Jun	YouGov/The Sun	1,847	32%	38%	10%	13%	2%	4%	6
17–18 Jun	YouGov/The Sun	1,921	31%	38%	10%	12%	2%	6%	7
16–17 Jun	YouGov/The Sun	1,705	31%	40%	10%	13%	2%	4%	9
13–14 Jun	YouGov/Sunday Times	1,897	30%	39%	10%	14%	2%	5%	9
12–14 Jun	Opinium/The Observer	1,942	27%	36%	7%	20%	3%	8%	9
12–13 Jun	ComRes/Sunday Mirror/Independent	2,041	26%	35%	10%	19%	4%	6%	9
12–13 Jun	YouGov/The Sun	1,861	32%	39%	10%	12%	2%	5%	7
11–12 Jun	YouGov/The Sun	1,926	30%	38%	11%	12%	3%	5%	8
10–11 Jun	YouGov/The Sun	1,874	30%	38%	9%	16%	3%	4%	8
9–10 Jun	YouGov/The Sun	1,689	28%	39%	11%	15%	2%	5%	11
8–10 Jun	Ipsos MORI/Evening Standard	1,023	31%	35%	10%	12%	4%	8%	4
6–10 Jun	TNS BMRB	1,208	27%	36%	8%	19%	3%	7%	9
7–9 Jun	ICM/The Guardian	1,002	29%	36%	12%	12%	2%	8%	7
6–7 Jun	YouGov/Sunday Times	1,836	30%	40%	9%	14%	2%	5%	10
5–6 Jun	YouGov/The Sun	1,905	32%	39%	10%	13%	3%	3%	7
4–5 Jun	YouGov/The Sun	1,939	30%	39%	10%	14%	3%	4%	9
3–4 Jun	YouGov/The Sun	1,974	30%	40%	10%	14%	2%	4%	10
3 Jun	YouGov/The Sun	1,387	31%	38%	10%	16%	2%	3%	7
30 May – 3 Jun	TNS BMRB	1,190	24%	37%	10%	19%	3%	7%	13
31 May – 2 Jun	Lord Ashcroft	1,007	27%	37%	9%	15%	12%		10
30–31 May	YouGov/Sunday Times	1,879	30%	39%	10%	15%	2%	4%	9
28–31 May	Opinium/The Observer	1,948	26%	37%	6%	21%	4%	6%	11
30 May	Survation/Sun on Sunday	1,007	25%	36%	10%	20%	4%	5%	11
29–30 May	YouGov/The Sun	1,928	30%	38%	11%	14%	3%	4%	8
28–29 May	YouGov/The Sun	1,915	30%	37%	11%	14%	3%	5%	7
17–29 May	Lord Ashcroft	20,062	27%	38%	9%	18%	3%	5%	11
27–28 May	YouGov/The Sun	1,995	29%	39%	10%	15%	3%	5%	10
24–26 May	ComRes/Independent	1,000	30%	34%	10%	17%	2%	7%	4
24 May	Survation/Mail on Sunday	1,121	24%	35%	10%	22%	4%	5%	11
23–24 May	YouGov/Sunday Times	1,839	30%	40%	10%	14%	2%	4%	10
22–24 May	ComRes/Open Europe	2,003	26%	37%	9%	20%	3%	5%	11
22–23 May	YouGov/The Sun	1,671	29%	42%	11%	13%	2%	4%	13
21–22 May	YouGov/The Sun	1,810	29%	39%	11%	16%	1%	4%	10
20–21 May	YouGov/The Sun	1,914	27%	38%	10%	16%	4%	5%	11
19–20 May	YouGov/The Sun	1,770	31%	39%	10%	14%	2%	4%	8
17–18 May	Survation/Mail on Sunday	1,000	24%	35%	11%	22%	0%	8%	11
16–17 May	YouGov/Sunday Times	1,809	29%	40%	9%	14%	3%	5%	11
15–16 May	ComRes/Sunday Mirror/Independent	2,017	29%	35%	8%	19%	4%	5%	6
15–16 May	YouGov/The Sun	1,774	31%	39%	9%	15%	2%	4%	8
14–16 May	Opinium/The Observer	1,955	27%	37%	7%	20%	4%	5%	10
14–16 May	TNS BMRB	1,264	28%	37%	7%	18%	4%	6%	9
14–15 May	YouGov/The Sun	1,886	30%	40%	10%	14%	2%	5%	10
13–14 May	YouGov/The Sun	1,900	30%	40%	10%	15%	2%	3%	10
12–13 May	YouGov/The Sun	1,748	31%	38%	10%	14%	2%	5%	7
11–13 May	Ipsos MORI/Evening Standard	1,009	31%	34%	10%	13%	5%	8%	3
10–12 May	ICM/The Guardian	1,001	28%	34%	11%	18%	2%	7%	6
9–10 May	YouGov/Sunday Times	1,945	30%	39%	9%	16%	3%	3%	9
8–9 May	YouGov/The Sun	1,876	30%	39%	10%	14%	2%	4%	9
7–8 May	YouGov/The Sun	1,931	27%	38%	11%	17%	2%	5%	11
6–7 May	YouGov/The Sun	2,000	29%	39%	9%	16%	2%	5%	10
2–3 May	YouGov/Sunday Times	1,959	30%	40%	11%	12%	2%	5%	10
2 May	Local elections in England and Wales; South Shields by-election (Lab hold)								
1–2 May	YouGov/The Sun	1,851	32%	43%	9%	10%	1%	5%	11
30 Apr – 2 May	Opinium/The Observer	1,951	28%	35%	9%	17%	4%	7%	7
30 Apr – 1 May	YouGov/The Sun	1,784	33%	39%	10%	13%	2%	3%	6
29–30 Apr	YouGov/The Sun	1,891	30%	39%	11%	14%	2%	4%	9
28–29 Apr	YouGov/The Sun	1,632	30%	39%	11%	14%	3%	4%	9
26–28 Apr	ComRes/Independent	1,001	32%	38%	9%	13%	4%	4%	6
26–28 Apr	Survation/Mail on Sunday	1,001	29%	36%	12%	16%	3%	5%	7
25–26 Apr	YouGov/Sunday Times	1,898	31%	40%	11%	11%	3%	5%	9
24–25 Apr	YouGov/The Sun	1,836	32%	40%	11%	12%	2%	3%	8
23–24 Apr	YouGov/The Sun	1,997	31%	39%	10%	11%	3%	5%	8
22–23 Apr	YouGov/The Sun	1,934	33%	40%	10%	12%	3%	3%	7
21–22 Apr	YouGov/The Sun	1,722	32%	39%	11%	13%	2%	4%	7
18–19 Apr	YouGov/Sunday Times	1,903	32%	40%	11%	10%	2%	5%	8
17–18 Apr	YouGov/The Sun	1,912	33%	40%	10%	11%	2%	5%	7
16–18 Apr	Opinium/The Observer	1,969	29%	35%	8%	17%	4%	7%	6
16–17 Apr	YouGov/The Sun	1,937	30%	41%	10%	12%	2%	5%	11
15–16 Apr	YouGov/The Sun	1,952	33%	40%	10%	11%	2%	4%	7
13–15 Apr	Ipsos MORI/Evening Standard	1,010	29%	38%	10%	15%	4%	4%	9
14–15 Apr	YouGov/The Sun	1,609	31%	39%	12%	12%	2%	4%	8
12–14 Apr	ICM/The Guardian	1,005	32%	38%	15%	9%	2%	5%	6
12–13 Apr	Angus Reid Public Opinion	2,004	27%	39%	8%	16%	3%	7%	12
11–12 Apr	YouGov/Sunday Times	1,982	31%	42%	12%	11%	2%	3%	11
10–11 Apr	ComRes/Independent/Sunday Mirror	2,012	30%	38%	8%	15%	3%	6%	8
10–11 Apr	YouGov/The Sun	1,976	32%	42%	9%	11%	2%	4%	10
9–10 Apr	YouGov/The Sun	2,035	28%	42%	12%	11%	2%	5%	14
8–9 Apr	YouGov/The Sun	1,893	33%	41%	10%	10%	2%	4%	8
7–8 Apr	YouGov/The Sun	1,765	30%	40%	12%	12%	2%	4%	10
4–8 Apr	TNS BMRB	1,184	25%	40%	10%	14%	4%	7%	15
4–5 Apr	YouGov/Sunday Times	1,991	30%	40%	11%	13%	2%	4%	10
3–4 Apr	YouGov/The Sun	2,013	30%	42%	11%	12%	2%	4%	12
2–4 Apr	Opinium/The Observer	1,948	28%	38%	8%	17%	3%	6%	10
2–3 Apr	YouGov/The Sun	1,994	33%	41%	9%	11%	2%	4%	8
1–2 Apr	YouGov/The Sun	1,757	30%	43%	11%	10%	3%	3%	13
27–28 Mar	YouGov/The Sun	1,918	29%	42%	11%	13%	2%	3%	13
26–27 Mar	YouGov/The Sun	1,867	30%	40%	12%	13%	2%	3%	10
25–26 Mar	YouGov/The Sun	2,047	30%	39%	13%	12%	2%	3%	9
24–25 Mar	YouGov/The Sun	1,655	30%	41%	13%	11%	2%	4%	11
21–25 Mar	TNS BMRB	1,204	27%	37%	10%	17%	3%	7%	10
22–24 Mar	ComRes/Independent	1,003	28%	38%	12%	14%	3%	5%	10
21–22 Mar	YouGov/Sunday Times	1,937	30%	41%	12%	12%	2%	3%	11
20–21 Mar	YouGov/The Sun	1,925	32%	41%	11%	10%	2%	4%	9
19–21 Mar	Opinium/The Observer	1,958	28%	38%	9%	16%	2%	7%	10
19–20 Mar	YouGov/The Sun	1,942	30%	41%	11%	12%	1%	5%	11
18–19 Mar	YouGov/The Sun	1,920	31%	41%	11%	11%	2%	4%	10
17–18 Mar	YouGov/The Sun	1,779	32%	40%	11%	10%	2%	4%	8
14–18 Mar	TNS BMRB	1,205	26%	39%	13%	13%	2%	6%	13
14–15 Mar	YouGov/Sunday Times	1,918	29%	41%	12%	12%	2%	4%	12
13–14 Mar	ComRes/Sunday Mirror/Independent	2,015	28%	37%	9%	17%	4%	5%	9
13–14 Mar	YouGov/The Sun	1,962	30%	42%	11%	11%	2%	5%	12
12–13 Mar	YouGov/The Sun	1,871	31%	40%	11%	12%	3%	4%	9
11–12 Mar	YouGov/The Sun	1,969	29%	43%	11%	12%	1%	4%	14
10–11 Mar	YouGov/The Sun	1,684	32%	40%	11%	11%	1%	5%	8
9–11 Mar	Ipsos MORI/Evening Standard	1,009	27%	40%	11%	13%	4%	5%	13
7–11 Mar	TNS BMRB	1,191	25%	38%	11%	15%	3%	7%	13
8–10 Mar	ICM/The Guardian	1,002	31%	39%	15%	7%	2%	6%	8
7–8 Mar	YouGov/Sunday Times	1,525	31%	41%	12%	11%	1%	4%	10
6–7 Mar	YouGov/The Sun	1,865	32%	41%	11%	11%	2%	4%	9
5–7 Mar	Opinium/The Observer	1,950	27%	39%	8%	17%	3%	6%	12
5–6 Mar	YouGov/The Sun	1,964	31%	41%	11%	12%	2%	4%	10
4–5 Mar	YouGov/The Sun	1,906	29%	42%	11%	12%	2%	4%	13
3–4 Mar	YouGov/The Sun	1,727	31%	40%	12%	12%	1%	5%	9
28 Feb – 4 Mar	TNS BMRB	1,194	29%	38%	11%	14%	3%	6%	9
28 Feb – 1 Mar	YouGov/Sunday Times	1,897	31%	42%	10%	11%	2%	3%	11
28 Feb	Eastleigh by-election (LD hold)								
27–28 Feb	YouGov/The Sun	1,761	29%	42%	12%	11%	2%	4%	13
26–27 Feb	YouGov/The Sun	1,966	32%	43%	11%	8%	1%	5%	11
25–26 Feb	YouGov/The Sun	1,925	32%	42%	12%	9%	1%	5%	10
24–25 Feb	YouGov/The Sun	1,704	32%	44%	10%	8%	2%	4%	12
22–24 Feb	YouGov/The Sunday Times	1,964	32%	43%	11%	9%	2%	3%	11
22–24 Feb	ComRes/Independent	1,005	31%	43%	8%	9%	4%	5%	12
20–21 Feb	YouGov/The Sun	1,920	31%	45%	11%	9%	2%	2%	14
19–21 Feb	Opinium/The Observer	1,956	29%	41%	8%	13%	2%	7%	12
19–20 Feb	YouGov/The Sun	1,968	33%	43%	9%	10%	2%	3%	10
18–19 Feb	YouGov/The Sun	1,855	29%	44%	11%	11%	1%	4%	15
17–18 Feb	YouGov/The Sun	1,713	32%	41%	12%	8%	2%	4%	9
14–18 Feb	TNS BMRB	1,211	29%	38%	11%	12%	3%	7%	9
14–15 Feb	YouGov/Sunday Times	1,871	32%	43%	12%	9%	1%	3%	11
13–14 Feb	ComRes/Sunday Mirror/Independent	2,002	31%	36%	8%	14%	4%	6%	5
13–14 Feb	YouGov/The Sun	1,892	31%	42%	11%	10%	2%	3%	11
12–13 Feb	YouGov/The Sun	1,946	32%	42%	9%	9%	3%	4%	10
11–12 Feb	YouGov/The Sun	1,902	32%	43%	10%	9%	2%	4%	11
10–11 Feb	YouGov/The Sun	1,691	31%	42%	11%	9%	2%	5%	11
9–11 Feb	Ipsos MORI/Evening Standard	1,018	30%	42%	7%	9%	4%	8%	12
7–11 Feb	TNS BMRB	1,197	31%	41%	10%	10%	3%	5%	10
8–10 Feb	ICM/The Guardian	1,001	29%	41%	13%	9%	2%	6%	12
7–8 Feb	YouGov/Sunday Times	1,930	32%	41%	11%	9%	2%	5%	9
6–7 Feb	YouGov/The Sun	1,917	33%	41%	11%	9%	2%	4%	8
5–7 Feb	Opinium/The Observer	1,953	29%	39%	8%	14%	4%	5%	10
5–6 Feb	YouGov/The Sun	1,955	31%	42%	12%	9%	1%	4%	11
4–5 Feb	YouGov/The Sun	1,962	32%	42%	11%	8%	2%	5%	10
3–4 Feb	YouGov/The Sun	1,712	30%	45%	11%	9%	2%	3%	15
31 Jan – 4 Feb	TNS BMRB	1,199	28%	41%	10%	11%	3%	7%	13
31 Jan – 1 Feb	YouGov/Sunday Times	2,030	34%	41%	12%	8%	1%	4%	7
30–31 Jan	YouGov/The Sun	1,914	32%	44%	10%	8%	2%	3%	12
29–30 Jan	YouGov/The Sun	1,939	33%	42%	10%	7%	2%	5%	9
28–29 Jan	YouGov/The Sun	1,971	33%	42%	11%	8%	2%	4%	9
27–28 Jan	YouGov/The Sun	1,727	35%	41%	10%	9%	2%	3%	6
25–27 Jan	ComRes/Independent	1,002	32%	39%	10%	10%	5%	4%	7
25 Jan	Survation/Mail on Sunday	1,005	31%	38%	10%	14%	2%	5%	7
24–25 Jan	YouGov/Sunday Times	1,943	35%	41%	12%	7%	1%	4%	6
24–25 Jan	Angus Reid Public Opinion	2,004	30%	39%	10%	12%	3%	6%	9
23–25 Jan	ComRes/Sunday Mirror/Independent	2,035	33%	39%	11%	10%	2%	5%	6
23–24 Jan	YouGov/The Sun	1,843	33%	43%	10%	9%	2%	3%	10
22–24 Jan	Opinium/The Observer	1,949	28%	41%	8%	14%	3%	6%	13
22–24 Jan	TNS BMRB	1,237	31%	41%	8%	12%	3%	6%	10
22–23 Jan	YouGov/The Sun	2,045	31%	43%	11%	10%	2%	3% BNP: 1%	12
21–22 Jan	YouGov/The Sun	2,119	31%	41%	12%	10%	2%	3% BNP on 1%	10
20–21 Jan	YouGov/The Sun	1,675	33%	42%	10%	10%	2%	2% BNP on 0%	9
18–20 Jan	ICM/The Guardian	1,001	33%	38%	15%	6%	2%	5%	5
17–18 Jan	YouGov/Sunday Times	1,912	33%	42%	11%	7%	2%	5%	9
16–17 Jan	YouGov/The Sun	1,887	34%	44%	9%	8%	2%	3% BNP on 1%	10
15–16 Jan	YouGov/The Sun	1,880	33%	42%	12%	8%	2%	3% BNP on 0%	9
14–15 Jan	YouGov/The Sun	2,007	32%	44%	10%	9%	2%	3% BNP on 0%	12
13–14 Jan	YouGov/The Sun	1,714	31%	44%	11%	9%	2%	3% BNP on 0%	13
12–14 Jan	Ipsos MORI/Evening Standard	1,015	30%	43%	8%	9%	3%	8%	13
11–14 Jan	TNS BMRB	1,198	31%	37%	9%	13%	3%	7%	6
10–11 Jan	YouGov/Sunday Times	1,995	31%	44%	11%	8%	2%	4%	13
10–11 Jan	Angus Reid Public Opinion	2,015	27%	42%	10%	11%	3%	6%	15
8–11 Jan	Opinium/The Observer	1,964	31%	41%	7%	12%	2%	9%	10
9–10 Jan	YouGov/The Sun	1,971	31%	42%	11%	10%	2%	3% BNP on 0%	11
8–9 Jan	YouGov/The Sun	1,980	33%	43%	10%	10%	2%	2% BNP on 0%	10
7–8 Jan	YouGov/The Sun	2,050	32%	44%	10%	9%	2%	3% BNP on 1%	12
6–7 Jan	YouGov/The Sun	1,750	32%	41%	11%	9%	2%	5% BNP on 1%	9
4–7 Jan	TNS BMRB	1,221	29%	39%	10%	12%	3%	7%	10
5 Jan	Survation/Mail on Sunday	790	29%	38%	11%	16%	3%	4%	9
3–4 Jan	YouGov/The Sun	1,988	32%	43%	10%	9%	2%	4% BNP on 1%	11
2–3 Jan	YouGov/The Sun	2,005	32%	43%	10%	9%	2%	4% BNP on 1%	11
1–2 Jan	YouGov/The Sun	1,760	31%	43%	11%	9%	2%	4% BNP on 0%	12

=== 2012 ===
Date(s) conducted	Polling organisation/client	Sample size	Con	Lab	LD	UKIP	Grn	Others	Lead
21–27 Dec	Opinium/The Observer	1,965	29%	**39%**	8%	15%	4%	5%	10
19–23 Dec	ICM/The Guardian	1,002	32%	**40%**	13%	7%	3%	5%	8
20–21 Dec	YouGov/Sunday Times	1,661	33%	**43%**	10%	8%	1%	5%	10
19–20 Dec	YouGov/The Sun	1,923	33%	**41%**	11%	10%	2%	4% BNP on 1%	8
18–19 Dec	YouGov/The Sun	1,556	30%	**43%**	11%	10%	2%	4% BNP on 0%	13
17–18 Dec	YouGov/The Sun	1,816	32%	**43%**	9%	10%	2%	4% BNP on 1%	11
16–17 Dec	YouGov/The Sun	1,633	31%	**43%**	9%	11%	2%	3% BNP on 1%	12
13–17 Dec	TNS BMRB	1,190	30%	**43%**	7%	12%	4%	4%	13
15–16 Dec	ComRes/The Independent on Sunday; The Sunday Mirror	2,002	28%	**39%**	9%	14%	4%	6%	11
14–16 Dec	Populus/The Times	1,512	28%	**41%**	10%	11%	3%	7%	13
13–14 Dec	YouGov/The Sunday Times	1,794	33%	**45%**	9%	8%	2%	3%	12
12–13 Dec	YouGov/The Sun	1,736	33%	**43%**	9%	10%	2%	4% BNP on 0%	10
11–13 Dec	Opinium/The Observer	1,968	29%	**39%**	8%	14%	4%	6%	10
11–12 Dec	YouGov/The Sun	1,805	31%	**44%**	12%	9%	2%	3% BNP on 0%	13
10–11 Dec	YouGov/The Sun	1,897	31%	**43%**	10%	9%	2%	4% BNP on 0%	12
9–10 Dec	YouGov/The Sun	1,729	33%	**42%**	10%	8%	2%	5% BNP on 1%	9
8–10 Dec	Ipsos MORI/Evening Standard	1,023	35%	**44%**	9%	7%	3%	2%	9
6–10 Dec	TNS BMRB	1,171	26%	**41%**	8%	16%	3%	6%	15
6–7 Dec	YouGov/The Sunday Times	1,779	33%	**42%**	10%	9%	2%	4%	9
5–6 Dec	YouGov/The Sun	1,899	32%	**42%**	10%	9%	2%	6% BNP on 1%	10
4–5 Dec	YouGov/The Sun	1,784	32%	**44%**	9%	10%	2%	3% BNP on 0%	12
4 Dec	Angus Reid Public Opinion	2,005	28%	**42%**	10%	11%	3%	6%	14
3–4 Dec	YouGov/The Sun	1,743	30%	**44%**	11%	10%	1%	4% BNP on 1%	14
2–3 Dec	YouGov/The Sun	1,584	31%	**43%**	11%	10%	2%	3% BNP on 1%	12
29 Nov – 3 Dec	TNS BMRB	1,172	28%	**40%**	10%	12%	2%	8%	12
30 Nov – 1 Dec	YouGov/The Sunday Times	1,773	31%	**44%**	10%	10%	2%	4%	13
29 Nov	Croydon North by-election, Middlesbrough by-election and Rotherham by-election (all Lab holds)								
28–29 Nov	YouGov/The Sun	1,854	32%	**42%**	10%	10%	2%	5% BNP on 1%	10
27–29 Nov	Opinium	1,949	29%	**38%**	9%	13%	3%	8%	9
27–28 Nov	YouGov/The Sun	1,842	32%	**44%**	11%	8%	2%	4% BNP on 1%	12
26–27 Nov	YouGov/The Sun	1,910	31%	**43%**	9%	11%	2%	5% BNP on 1%	12
25–26 Nov	YouGov/The Sun	1,624	34%	**43%**	9%	8%	1%	5% BNP on 1%	9
22–26 Nov	TNS BMRB	1,212	31%	**41%**	8%	10%	3%	7%	10
22–23 Nov	YouGov/The Sunday Times	1,812	33%	**44%**	9%	8%	2%	4%	11
21–22 Nov	YouGov/The Sun	1,808	31%	**43%**	10%	9%	2%	5% BNP on 1%	12
20–21 Nov	YouGov/The Sun	1,691	33%	**41%**	9%	10%	3%	4% BNP on 1%	8
19–20 Nov	YouGov/The Sun	1,627	33%	**42%**	10%	8%	2%	5% BNP on 2%	9
18–19 Nov	YouGov/The Sun	1,552	32%	**42%**	9%	9%	2%	6% BNP on 2%	10
16–18 Nov	ICM/The Guardian	1,001	32%	**40%**	13%	7%	2%	6%	8
15–16 Nov	YouGov/The Sunday Times	1,893	33%	**44%**	9%	8%	2%	4%	11
14–16 Nov	TNS BMRB	1,156	31%	**39%**	11%	7%	4%	8%	8
15 Nov	Cardiff South and Penarth by-election (Lab hold), Corby by-election (Lab gain from Con) and Manchester Central by-election (Lab hold)								
14–15 Nov	YouGov/The Sun	1,746	33%	**43%**	8%	9%	2%	4% BNP on 1%	10
13–14 Nov	YouGov/The Sun	1,864	35%	**42%**	8%	7%	3%	5% BNP on 1%	7
13 Nov	Opinium	1,957	32%	**39%**	8%	10%	3%	8%	7
12–13 Nov	YouGov/The Sun	1,828	34%	**44%**	9%	7%	2%	4% BNP on 1%	10
10–13 Nov	Ipsos MORI/Evening Standard	1,014	32%	**46%**	9%	3%	4%	6%	14
11–12 Nov	YouGov/The Sun	1,583	35%	**39%**	10%	8%	2%	6% BNP on 1%	4
8–12 Nov	TNS BMRB	1,161	31%	**41%**	9%	9%	3%	7%	10
8–9 Nov	YouGov/The Sunday Times	1,642	32%	**44%**	8%	8%	2%	5%	12
7–8 Nov	YouGov/The Sun	1,859	33%	**44%**	9%	7%	2%	5% BNP on 1%	11
6–7 Nov	YouGov/The Sun	1,873	34%	**45%**	8%	6%	3%	4% BNP on 1%	11
5–6 Nov	YouGov/The Sun	1,816	35%	**42%**	9%	7%	2%	5% BNP on 1%	7
4–5 Nov	YouGov/The Sun	1,608	35%	**44%**	8%	7%	2%	4% BNP on 1%	9
1–5 Nov	TNS BMRB	1,194	31%	**42%**	9%	8%	3%	7%	11
1–2 Nov	YouGov/The Sunday Times	1,851	35%	**42%**	9%	7%	2%	5%	7
31 Oct – 1 Nov	YouGov/The Sun	1,743	33%	**44%**	9%	7%	3%	4% BNP on 1%	11
31 Oct – 1 Nov	Opinium	1,966	30%	**41%**	9%	10%	3%	7%	11
30–31 Oct	YouGov/The Sun	1,824	33%	**44%**	9%	8%	2%	4% BNP on 1%	11
29–30 Oct	YouGov/The Sun	1,936	32%	**44%**	9%	8%	2%	5% BNP on 1%	12
28–29 Oct	YouGov/The Sun	1,681	33%	**43%**	9%	8%	2%	5% BNP on 1%	10
25–29 Oct	TNS BMRB	1,164	31%	**42%**	11%	8%	2%	6%	11
25–26 Oct	YouGov/The Sunday Times	1,858	35%	**42%**	9%	7%	3%	3%	7
24–25 Oct	YouGov/The Sun	1,785	33%	**44%**	10%	6%	2%	4% BNP on 1%	11
23–24 Oct	YouGov/The Sun	1,818	33%	**43%**	9%	8%	2%	5% BNP on 1%	10
20–24 Oct	Ipsos MORI/Evening Standard	1,005	33%	**43%**	9%	6%	3%	6%	10
22–23 Oct	YouGov/The Sun	1,637	34%	**42%**	9%	8%	2%	5% BNP on 1%	8
21–22 Oct	YouGov/The Sun	1,666	32%	**45%**	8%	8%	3%	4% BNP on 1%	13
19–22 Oct	ICM/The Guardian	1,000	32%	**43%**	11%	5%	2%	7%	11
18–22 Oct	TNS BMRB	1,154	30%	**44%**	8%	7%	3%	8%	14
18–19 Oct	YouGov/The Sunday Times	1,734	32%	**43%**	9%	9%	2%	5%	11
17–18 Oct	YouGov/The Sun	1,830	34%	**42%**	10%	9%	2%	4% BNP on 1%	8
16–18 Oct	Opinium	1951	31%	**40%**	9%	10%	4%	6%	9
16–17 Oct	YouGov/The Sun	1,749	33%	**42%**	9%	7%	3%	6% BNP on 1%	9
15–16 Oct	YouGov/The Sun	1,766	34%	**43%**	9%	7%	2%	5% BNP on 1%	9
14–15 Oct	YouGov/The Sun	1,704	34%	**43%**	9%	7%	3%	5% BNP on 1%	9
11–12 Oct	Angus Reid Public Opinion	2,009	31%	**43%**	8%	8%	3%	7%	12
11–15 Oct	TNS BMRB	1,196	29%	**42%**	7%	10%	4%	8%	13
11–12 Oct	YouGov/The Sunday Times	1,902	33%	**43%**	10%	6%	2%	5%	10
10–11 Oct	YouGov/The Sun	1,761	35%	**42%**	8%	7%	2%	6% BNP on 2%	7
9–10 Oct	YouGov/The Sun	1,912	34%	**41%**	8%	10%	2%	5% BNP on 1%	7
8–9 Oct	YouGov/The Sun	1,899	33%	**45%**	9%	6%	3%	5% BNP on 2%	12
7–8 Oct	YouGov/The Sun	1,697	34%	**44%**	8%	7%	2%	5% BNP on 1%	10
4–5 Oct	YouGov/The Sunday Times	1,782	31%	**45%**	8%	8%	3%	4%	14
3–4 Oct	YouGov/The Sun	1,745	32%	**43%**	10%	8%	2%	5% BNP on 2%	11
2–4 Oct	Opinium	1,965	30%	**41%**	9%	11%	4%	5%	11
2–3 Oct	YouGov/The Sun	1,641	31%	**45%**	10%	7%	2%	5% BNP on 1%	14
1–2 Oct	YouGov/The Sun	1,726	34%	**42%**	9%	8%	2%	5% BNP on 1%	8
30 Sep – 1 Oct	YouGov/The Sun	1,710	34%	**43%**	9%	7%	7		9
27–28 Sep	YouGov/The Sunday Times	1,671	35%	**40%**	10%	7%	3%	6%	5
26–27 Sep	YouGov/The Sun	1,891	31%	**43%**	11%	8%	4%	4% BNP on 1%	12
25–26 Sep	YouGov/The Sun	1,760	32%	**41%**	9%	9%	3%	5% BNP on 1%	9
25 Sep	Opinium	1,969	29%	**39%**	10%	10%	4%	8%	10
24–25 Sep	YouGov/The Sun	1,764	31%	**44%**	9%	9%	3%	4% BNP on 1%	13
23–24 Sep	YouGov/The Sun	1,739	32%	**43%**	9%	7%	3%	6% BNP on 1%	11
20–21 Sep	YouGov/The Sunday Times	1,608	34%	**43%**	8%	8%	2%	5%	9
19–21 Sep	TNS BMRB	1,140	28%	**44%**	8%	7%	5%	8%	16
18–21 Sep	Opinium	1,964	30%	**42%**	8%	10%	4%	6%	12
19–20 Sep	YouGov/The Sun	1,906	35%	**41%**	9%	7%	3%	5% BNP on 2%	6
18–19 Sep	YouGov/The Sun	1,710	33%	**45%**	10%	7%	2%	4% BNP on 1%	12
17–18 Sep	YouGov/The Sun	1,744	34%	**43%**	8%	8%	3%	4% BNP on 1%	9
16–17 Sep	YouGov/The Sun	1,731	33%	**45%**	10%	5%	2%	5% BNP on 1%	12
15–17 Sep	Ipsos MORI/Evening Standard	1,006	30%	**41%**	13%	4%	8%	4%	11
13–14 Sep	YouGov/The Sunday Times	1,671	34%	**44%**	9%	7%	3%	4%	10
12–13 Sep	YouGov/The Sun	1,594	34%	**43%**	8%	7%	3%	5% BNP on 1%	9
11–12 Sep	YouGov/The Sun	1,703	33%	**42%**	11%	7%	1%	6% BNP on 1%	9
10–12 Sep	Opinium	1,961	32%	**40%**	10%	9%	3%	6%	8
10–11 Sep	YouGov/The Sun	1,682	31%	**44%**	9%	8%	3%	5% BNP on 1%	13
9–10 Sep	YouGov/The Sun	1,871	31%	**42%**	10%	8%	2%	7% BNP on 2%	11
6–7 Sep	YouGov/The Sunday Times	1,860	33%	**43%**	10%	7%	2%	5%	10
5–6 Sep	YouGov/The Sun	1,311	33%	**45%**	8%	6%	3%	4% BNP on 1%	12
4–5 Sep	YouGov/The Sun	1,474	33%	**45%**	8%	7%	2%	6% BNP on 1%	12
3–4 Sep	YouGov/The Sun	1,698	34%	**40%**	10%	7%	3%	6% BNP on 1%	6
2–3 Sep	YouGov/The Sun	1,716	33%	**44%**	8%	7%	2%	6% BNP on 2%	11
30–31 Aug	Opinium	1,947	31%	**42%**	8%	9%	3%	7%	11
30–31 Aug	YouGov/The Sunday Times	1,739	35%	**41%**	9%	7%	2%	5%	6
29–30 Aug	YouGov/The Sun	1,653	33%	**42%**	10%	8%	2%	6% BNP on 1%	9
28–29 Aug	YouGov/The Sun	1,763	32%	**44%**	9%	6%	3%	7% BNP on 1%	12
27–28 Aug	YouGov/The Sun	1,695	32%	**44%**	10%	8%	3%	5% BNP on 1%	12
24–26 Aug	ICM/The Guardian	1,006	34%	**39%**	15%	4%	2%	7%	5
22–23 Aug	YouGov/The Sun	1,684	32%	**44%**	10%	7%	3%	5% BNP on 1%	12
21–22 Aug	YouGov/The Sun	1,674	33%	**42%**	10%	6%	2%	6% BNP on 2%	9
20–21 Aug	YouGov/The Sun	1,743	34%	**44%**	8%	8%	2%	4% BNP on 1%	10
19–20 Aug	YouGov/The Sun	1,725	34%	**44%**	8%	7%	3%	4% BNP on 1%	10
16–17 Aug	YouGov/The Sunday Times	1,687	32%	**43%**	10%	7%	2%	6%	11
15–16 Aug	YouGov/The Sun	1,720	35%	**44%**	8%	6%	2%	6% BNP on 1%	9
14–15 Aug	Angus Reid Public Opinion	2,012	30%	**41%**	11%	9%	3%	6%	11
14–15 Aug	YouGov/The Sun	1,711	34%	**43%**	10%	6%	2%	5% BNP on 1%	9
13–14 Aug	YouGov/The Sun	1,758	34%	**44%**	10%	7%	1%	4% BNP on 1%	10
12–13 Aug	YouGov/The Sun	1,742	34%	**42%**	9%	6%	3%	5% BNP on 1%	8
11–13 Aug	Ipsos MORI/Evening Standard	1,007	32%	**42%**	11%	4%	4%	7%	10
9–10 Aug	YouGov/The Sunday Times	1,704	34%	**42%**	8%	8%	2%	5%	8
8–9 Aug	YouGov/The Sun	1,751	33%	**42%**	9%	9%	3%	5% BNP on 1%	9
7–9 Aug	Opinium	1,960	31%	**40%**	10%	10%	3%	6%	9
7–8 Aug	YouGov/The Sun	1,715	33%	**42%**	11%	6%	2%	6% BNP on 1%	9
6–7 Aug	YouGov/The Sun	1,733	33%	**44%**	9%	8%	2%	5% BNP on 1%	11
5–6 Aug	YouGov/The Sun	1,738	34%	**44%**	10%	6%	2%	4% BNP on 1%	10
2–3 Aug	YouGov/The Sunday Times	1,787	32%	**44%**	10%	8%	2%	4%	12
1–2 Aug	YouGov/The Sun	1,654	33%	**44%**	8%	9%	2%	3% BNP on 0%	11
31 Jul – 1 Aug	YouGov/The Sun	1,744	32%	**43%**	10%	8%	2%	5% BNP on 1%	11
30–31 Jul	YouGov/The Sun	1,704	34%	**42%**	10%	6%	2%	5% BNP on 1%	8
29–30 Jul	YouGov/The Sun	1,736	33%	**44%**	9%	7%	2%	5% BNP on 2%	11
26–27 Jul	YouGov/The Sunday Times	1,751	33%	**42%**	9%	8%	3%	5%	9
25–26 Jul	YouGov/The Sun	1,702	33%	**42%**	9%	7%	3%	5% BNP on 1%	9
24–25 Jul	YouGov/The Sun	1,766	33%	**44%**	9%	7%	2%	6% BNP on 1%	11
23–24 Jul	YouGov/The Sun	1,745	33%	**44%**	9%	7%	3%	4% BNP on 1%	11
22–23 Jul	YouGov/The Sun	1,730	33%	**43%**	9%	8%	1%	6% BNP on 1%	10
19–20 Jul	YouGov/The Sunday Times	1,617	34%	**43%**	11%	7%	3%	3%	9
18–19 Jul	YouGov/The Sun	1,658	34%	**42%**	9%	7%	2%	4% BNP on 1%	8
17–18 Jul	YouGov/The Sun	1,774	33%	**43%**	8%	7%	2%	7% BNP on 1%	10
16–17 Jul	YouGov/The Sun	1,690	34%	**43%**	8%	7%	2%	5% BNP on 1%	9
15–16 Jul	YouGov/The Sun	1,724	33%	**44%**	9%	8%	2%	5% BNP on 1%	11
14–16 Jul	Ipsos MORI/Evening Standard	1,006	31%	**44%**	12%	5%	3%	5%	13
13–16 Jul	Opinium	1,951	32%	**41%**	9%	8%	4%	6%	9
12–13 Jul	YouGov/The Sunday Times	1,752	34%	**43%**	9%	7%	3%	5%	9
11–12 Jul	YouGov/The Sun	1,759	34%	**42%**	9%	7%	3%	5% BNP on 1%	8
10–11 Jul	YouGov/The Sun	1,696	35%	**42%**	9%	8%	2%	5% BNP on 1%	7
9–10 Jul	YouGov/The Sun	1,697	33%	**43%**	11%	6%	3%	4% BNP on 1%	10
8–9 Jul	YouGov/The Sun	1,721	35%	**44%**	7%	6%	3%	5% BNP on 0%	9
5–6 Jul	YouGov/The Sunday Times	1,712	32%	**43%**	8%	8%	3%	5%	11
4–5 Jul	YouGov/The Sun	1,762	35%	**43%**	8%	8%	2%	5% BNP on 1%	8
3–5 Jul	Opinium	1,956	30%	**40%**	9%	9%	4%	8%	10
3–4 Jul	YouGov/The Sun	1,761	33%	**44%**	8%	7%	3%	5% BNP on 1%	11
2–3 Jul	YouGov/The Sun	1,730	35%	**42%**	10%	7%	2%	4% BNP on 1%	7
1–2 Jul	YouGov/The Sun	1,748	34%	**44%**	8%	8%	2%	5% BNP on 1%	10
28–29 Jun	YouGov/The Sunday Times	1,760	34%	**43%**	9%	6%	2%	5%	9
27–28 Jun	YouGov/The Sun	1,764	32%	**43%**	10%	7%	3%	5% BNP on 1%	11
26–28 Jun	Opinium	1,959	31%	**42%**	8%	9%	4%	6%	11
26–27 Jun	YouGov/The Sun	1,751	31%	**45%**	9%	7%	2%	5% BNP on 1%	14
25–26 Jun	YouGov/The Sun	1,614	34%	**42%**	11%	7%	2%	5% BNP on 1%	8
24–25 Jun	YouGov/The Sun	1,697	32%	**43%**	11%	7%	1%	5% BNP on 1%	11
22–24 Jun	ICM/The Guardian	1,002	34%	**39%**	14%	3%	3%	7%	5
21–22 Jun	YouGov/The Sunday Times	1,734	34%	**43%**	9%	8%	2%	5%	9
20–21 Jun	YouGov/The Sun	1,642	33%	**43%**	8%	8%	2%	5% BNP on 1%	10
19–20 Jun	YouGov/The Sun	1,752	34%	**41%**	10%	8%	3%	5% BNP on 1%	7
18–19 Jun	YouGov/The Sun	1,727	34%	**44%**	7%	6%	2%	6% BNP on 1%	10
17–18 Jun	YouGov/The Sun	1,716	33%	**44%**	7%	8%	2%	6% BNP on 1%	11
15–17 Jun	Populus/The Times	1,503	33%	**41%**	9%	5%	5%	7%	8
14–15 Jun	YouGov/The Sunday Times	1,761	32%	**44%**	9%	8%	3%	5%	12
13–15 Jun	ComRes/Independent on Sunday; Sunday Mirror	2,014	32%	**42%**	9%	8%	3%	6%	10
13–14 Jun	YouGov/The Sun	1,711	31%	**43%**	9%	8%	3%	6% BNP on 2%	12
12–13 Jun	YouGov/The Sun	1,675	31%	**43%**	9%	9%	2%	6% BNP on 1%	12
11–12 Jun	YouGov/The Sun	1,699	33%	**43%**	8%	8%	3%	5% BNP on 1%	10
10–11 Jun	YouGov/The Sun	1,763	31%	**45%**	9%	9%	3%	6% BNP on 2%	14
9–11 Jun	Ipsos MORI/Evening Standard	1,016	31%	**40%**	10%	6%	5%	8%	9
8–11 Jun	Opinium	1,962	31%	**42%**	9%	8%	4%	6%	11
7–8 Jun	YouGov/The Sunday Times	1,667	34%	**42%**	7%	9%	3%	5%	8
6–7 Jun	YouGov/The Sun	1,827	34%	**43%**	8%	6%	3%	6% BNP on 1%	9
5–6 Jun	YouGov/The Sun	1,766	34%	**43%**	8%	7%	3%	5% BNP on 1%	9
31 May – 1 Jun	YouGov/The Sunday Times	1,546	32%	**42%**	8%	7%	4%	5%	10
30–31 May	YouGov/The Sun	1,694	31%	**45%**	9%	8%	3%	5% BNP on 1%	14
29–30 May	Angus Reid Public Opinion	2,005	29%	**45%**	9%	8%	3%	6%	16
29–30 May	YouGov/The Sun	1,670	32%	**44%**	9%	7%	3%	6% BNP on 1%	12
28–29 May	YouGov/The Sun	1,670	32%	**45%**	8%	8%	2%	5% BNP on 1%	13
27–28 May	YouGov/The Sun	1,743	33%	**44%**	8%	7%	3%	5% BNP on 1%	11
25–28 May	ComRes/The Independent	1,001	34%	**42%**	11%	4%	3%	9%	8
24–25 May	YouGov/The Sunday Times	1,640	31%	**43%**	8%	8%	3%	6%	12
23–24 May	YouGov/The Sun	1,681	34%	**42%**	8%	7%	4%	5% BNP on 1%	8
22–23 May	YouGov/The Sun	1,682	32%	**42%**	9%	9%	3%	5% BNP on 1%	10
21–22 May	YouGov/The Sun	1,727	32%	**43%**	8%	9%	3%	5% BNP on 1%	11
20–21 May	YouGov/The Sun	1,705	32%	**44%**	7%	8%	3%	5% BNP on 1%	12
18–20 May	Populus/The Times	1,500	33%	**41%**	10%	5%	3%	10%	8
18–20 May	ICM/The Guardian	1,002	36%	**41%**	11%	4%	3%	6%	5
17–18 May	YouGov/The Sunday Times	1,683	32%	**43%**	8%	9%	2%	6%	11
16–17 May	ComRes/Independent on Sunday; Sunday Mirror	2,038	32%	**41%**	11%	7%	3%	6%	9
16–17 May	YouGov/The Sun	1,757	31%	**44%**	7%	9%	3%	6% BNP on 1%	13
15–17 May	Opinium	1,957	30%	**41%**	9%	10%	3%	7%	11
15–16 May	YouGov/The Sun	1,751	31%	**45%**	9%	8%	2%	5% BNP on 1%	14
14–15 May	YouGov/The Sun	1,692	32%	**43%**	8%	9%	3%	5% BNP on 1%	11
13–14 May	YouGov/The Sun	1,720	31%	**45%**	7%	8%	3%	5% BNP on 1%	14
12–14 May	Ipsos MORI/Evening Standard	1,006	33%	**43%**	9%	6%	3%	7%	10
10–11 May	YouGov/The Sunday Times	1,663	31%	**43%**	10%	8%	2%	7%	12
9–10 May	YouGov/The Sun	1,825	34%	**44%**	7%	7%	3%	5% BNP on 0%	10
8–9 May	YouGov/The Sun	1,708	31%	**44%**	9%	8%	3%	6% BNP on 1%	13
7–8 May	YouGov/The Sun	1,658	31%	**44%**	8%	8%	3%	6% BNP on 1%	13
5–7 May	TNS-BMRB	1,207	30%	**43%**	10%	4%	13%		13
3–4 May	YouGov/The Sunday Times	1,798	31%	**43%**	9%	8%	3%	6%	12
3 May	Local elections in England, Scotland and Wales								
2–3 May	YouGov/The Sun	1,745	32%	**41%**	9%	9%	4%	5% BNP on 1%	9
1–2 May	YouGov/The Sun	1,749	33%	**43%**	8%	8%	3%	5% BNP on 1%	10
30 Apr – 1 May	YouGov/The Sun	1,744	32%	**41%**	9%	8%	4%	6% BNP on 1%	9
29–30 Apr	YouGov/The Sun	1,763	35%	**42%**	8%	7%	2%	6% BNP on 1%	7
27–30 Apr	Opinium	1,769	32%	**39%**	8%	10%	4%	7%	7
26–27 Apr	YouGov/The Sunday Times	1,717	29%	**40%**	11%	10%	3%	7%	11
25–27 Apr	ComRes/The Independent	2,048	34%	**39%**	10%	9%	2%	6%	5
25–26 Apr	YouGov/The Sun	1,717	31%	**43%**	9%	9%	2%	7% BNP on 2%	12
24–25 Apr	YouGov/The Sun	1,817	32%	**43%**	9%	8%	3%	5% BNP on 1%	11
23–24 Apr	YouGov/The Sun	1,787	32%	**43%**	8%	8%	3%	5% BNP on 1%	11
22–23 Apr	YouGov/The Sun	1,651	32%	**45%**	8%	7%	3%	5% BNP on 1%	13
21–23 Apr	Ipsos MORI/Evening Standard	1,002	35%	**38%**	12%	4%	4%	7%	3
20–23 Apr	Opinium	2,233	31%	**38%**	11%	8%	4%	8%	7
20–22 Apr	ICM/The Guardian	1,000	33%	**41%**	15%	3%	2%	7%	8
19–20 Apr	YouGov/The Sunday Times	1,715	33%	**41%**	11%	8%	2%	5%	8
18–19 Apr	ComRes/The Independent on Sunday/Sunday Mirror	2,048	34%	**40%**	11%	6%	3%	5%	6
18–19 Apr	YouGov/The Sun	1,722	32%	**45%**	8%	7%	3%	6% BNP on 1%	13
17–18 Apr	YouGov/The Sun	1,745	32%	**41%**	10%	8%	2%	6% BNP on 1%	9
16–17 Apr	YouGov/The Sun	1,799	32%	**41%**	8%	9%	3%	7% BNP on 1%	9
15–16 Apr	YouGov/The Sun	1,783	32%	**43%**	8%	9%	2%	6% BNP on 1%	11
13–16 Apr	Opinium	1,957	32%	**37%**	9%	10%	4%	8%	5
13–15 Apr	Populus/The Times	1,003	33%	**42%**	11%	4%	3%	9%	9
12–13 Apr	Angus Reid Public Opinion	2,010	29%	**41%**	11%	8%	3%	8%	12
12–13 Apr	YouGov/The Sunday Times	1,650	33%	**39%**	10%	7%	2%	8%	6
11–12 Apr	YouGov/The Sun	1,686	35%	**41%**	9%	7%	3%	6% BNP on 1%	6
11 Apr	TNS-BMRB	TBC	32%	**42%**	10%	9%	7%		10
10–11 Apr	YouGov/The Sun	1,727	35%	**41%**	8%	6%	3%	7% BNP on 2%	6
9–10 Apr	YouGov/The Sun	1,661	36%	**40%**	9%	6%	2%	7% BNP on 1%	4
4–5 Apr	YouGov/The Sun	1,744	33%	**42%**	8%	7%	3%	7% BNP on 2%	9
3–4 Apr	YouGov/The Sun	1,742	32%	**42%**	9%	8%	3%	6% BNP on 1%	10
2–3 Apr	YouGov/The Sun	1,744	34%	**42%**	8%	6%	2%	7% BNP on 1%	8
1–2 Apr	YouGov/The Sun	1,732	33%	**43%**	8%	6%	3%	7% BNP on 1%	10
30–31 Mar	YouGov/The Sunday Times	1,567	33%	**42%**	8%	7%	3%	7%	9
29 Mar	Bradford West by-election (Rsp gain from Lab)								
28–29 Mar	YouGov/The Sun	1,701	34%	**44%**	8%	5%	2%	7% BNP on 2%	10
27–28 Mar	YouGov/The Sun	1,807	34%	**44%**	10%	6%	2%	5% BNP on 1%	10
26–27 Mar	YouGov/The Sun	1,682	33%	**43%**	9%	7%	2%	6% BNP on 1%	10
25–26 Mar	YouGov/The Sun	1,734	35%	**42%**	9%	6%	3%	5% BNP on 1%	7
23–26 Mar	ComRes/The Independent	1,010	33%	**43%**	11%	3%	10%		10
23–25 Mar	Populus/The Times	1,500	34%	**38%**	11%	4%	5%	8%	4
22–23 Mar	YouGov/The Sunday Times	1,721	35%	**42%**	10%	6%	2%	6%	7
22–23 Mar	ICM/Sunday Telegraph	1,000	37%	**38%**	13%	4%	5%	4%	1
21–23 Mar	Opinium	1,957	34%	**39%**	8%	9%	3%	7%	5
21–22 Mar	YouGov/The Sun	1,835	34%	**42%**	9%	6%	2%	6% BNP on 1%	8
20–21 Mar	YouGov/The Sun	1,757	36%	**41%**	10%	5%	2%	6% BNP on 2%	5
19–20 Mar	YouGov/The Sun	1,748	35%	**43%**	9%	4%	2%	5% BNP on 1%	8
18–19 Mar	YouGov/The Sun	1,685	36%	**42%**	9%	5%	2%	6% BNP on 1%	6
17–19 Mar	Ipsos MORI/Evening Standard	1,014	35%	**38%**	12%	3%	5%	7%	3
16–18 Mar	ICM/The Guardian	1,000	**39%**	36%	15%	1%	2%	7%	3
15–16 Mar	YouGov/The Sunday Times	1,727	38%	**40%**	9%	5%	3%	6%	2
14–15 Mar	ComRes/The Independent on Sunday/Sunday Mirror	2,010	37%	**40%**	10%	6%	3%	4%	3
14–15 Mar	YouGov/The Sun	1,741	37%	**42%**	8%	5%	3%	5% BNP on 1%	5
13–14 Mar	YouGov/The Sun	1,738	38%	**41%**	9%	5%	3%	4% BNP on 1%	3
12–13 Mar	YouGov/The Sun	1,747	36%	**43%**	9%	5%	2%	5% BNP on 1%	7
11–12 Mar	YouGov/The Sun	1,801	36%	**41%**	9%	6%	2%	6% BNP on 1%	5
9–12 Mar	Opinium	1,955	**38%**	36%	10%	7%	3%	6%	2
8–9 Mar	YouGov/The Sunday Times	1,707	37%	**42%**	9%	5%	2%	5%	5
7–8 Mar	YouGov/The Sun	1,730	37%	**42%**	8%	4%	3%	5% BNP on 1%	5
6–7 Mar	Angus Reid Public Opinion	2,018	32%	**40%**	10%	7%	2%	9%	8
6–7 Mar	YouGov/The Sun	1,723	38%	**41%**	9%	6%	2%	4% BNP on 1%	3
5–6 Mar	YouGov/The Sun	1,736	37%	**41%**	9%	6%	3%	4% BNP on 1%	4
4–5 Mar	YouGov/The Sun	1,729	36%	**41%**	11%	5%	3%	5% BNP on 1%	5
2–5 Mar	TNS-BMRB	1,198	35%	**38%**	11%	8%	8%		3
1–2 Mar	YouGov/The Sunday Times	1,664	**40%**	39%	9%	5%	2%	5%	1
29 Feb – 1 Mar	YouGov/The Sun	1,787	**39%**	**39%**	8%	5%	3%	6% BNP on 1%	Tie
28–29 Feb	YouGov/The Sun	1,778	38%	**40%**	9%	5%	2%	6% BNP on 1%	2
27–28 Feb	YouGov/The Sun	1,729	**40%**	39%	9%	5%	2%	5% BNP on 1%	1
26–27 Feb	YouGov/The Sun	1,741	38%	**40%**	9%	6%	2%	5% BNP on 1%	2
25–27 Feb	Ipsos MORI/Reuters	1,002	35%	**41%**	12%	2%	4%	6%	6
24–26 Feb	ComRes/The Independent	1,001	37%	**40%**	13%	3%	3%	4%	3
23–24 Feb	YouGov/The Sunday Times	1,697	38%	**40%**	10%	5%	2%	5%	2
22–23 Feb	YouGov/The Sun	1,690	**39%**	38%	10%	4%	3%	7% BNP on 2%	1
21–23 Feb	Opinium	1,959	35%	**39%**	10%	6%	5%	6%	4
21–22 Feb	YouGov/The Sun	1,731	38%	**40%**	8%	5%	3%	7% BNP on 1%	2
20–21 Feb	YouGov/The Sun	1,715	37%	**41%**	9%	5%	2%	6% BNP on 2%	4
19–20 Feb	YouGov/The Sun	1,764	**39%**	38%	10%	5%	2%	6% BNP on 1%	1
17–19 Feb	ICM/The Guardian	1,013	36%	**37%**	14%	3%	3%	7%	1
16–17 Feb	YouGov/The Sunday Times	1,772	37%	**41%**	7%	6%	3%	6%	4
15–16 Feb	ComRes/The Independent on Sunday/Sunday Mirror	2,014	**39%**	38%	10%	5%	3%	5%	1
15–16 Feb	YouGov/The Sun	1,738	**39%**	**39%**	9%	5%	3%	5% BNP on 1%	Tie
14–15 Feb	YouGov/The Sun	1,828	39%	**40%**	9%	5%	2%	5% BNP on 1%	1
13–14 Feb	YouGov/The Sun	1,725	**40%**	39%	9%	5%	3%	5% BNP on 1%	1
12–13 Feb	YouGov/The Sun	1,772	38%	**42%**	9%	4%	2%	5% BNP on 1%	4
10–13 Feb	Opinium	1,960	**36%**	**36%**	10%	7%	4%	7%	Tie
9–10 Feb	YouGov/The Sunday Times	1,753	38%	**39%**	9%	4%	4%	6%	1
8–9 Feb	YouGov/The Sun	1,644	38%	**41%**	9%	4%	2%	5% BNP on 1%	3
7–8 Feb	YouGov/The Sun	1,763	**40%**	38%	10%	4%	3%	5% BNP on 1%	2
6–7 Feb	YouGov/The Sun	1,651	37%	**42%**	9%	5%	2%	6% BNP on 1%	5
5–6 Feb	YouGov/The Sun	1,697	**41%**	40%	8%	5%	1%	5% BNP on 1%	1
2–3 Feb	YouGov/The Sunday Times	1,659	39%	**40%**	9%	5%	3%	4%	1
1–2 Feb	YouGov/The Sun	1,654	39%	**41%**	8%	5%	2%	5% BNP on 1%	2
31 Jan – 1 Feb	YouGov/The Sun	1,701	38%	**40%**	8%	5%	3%	5% BNP on 1%	2
30–31 Jan	YouGov/The Sun	1,722	39%	**40%**	9%	4%	2%	6% BNP on 1%	1
29–30 Jan	YouGov/The Sun	1,977	**40%**	38%	10%	5%	2%	5% BNP on 1%	2
27–30 Jan	Opinium	1,958	**38%**	36%	8%	6%	4%	8%	2
27–29 Jan	ComRes/The Independent	1,001	37%	**38%**	14%	3%	2%	6%	1
26–27 Jan	YouGov/The Sunday Times	1,716	39%	**40%**	8%	5%	2%	5%	1
24–25 Jan	YouGov/The Sun	1,715	38%	**40%**	9%	6%	3%	4% BNP on 1%	2
23–24 Jan	YouGov/The Sun	1,693	**40%**	38%	9%	5%	2%	6% BNP on 1%	2
22–23 Jan	Angus Reid Public Opinion	2,009	35%	**37%**	11%	6%	3%	7%	2
22–23 Jan	YouGov/The Sun	1,766	39%	**40%**	8%	6%	2%	4% BNP on 1%	1
21–23 Jan	Ipsos MORI/Reuters	1,007	**38%**	**38%**	12%	3%	4%	5%	Tie
20–23 Jan	TNS-BMRB	1,300	37%	**40%**	10%	2%	11%		3
20–22 Jan	Populus/The Times	1,503	37%	**38%**	13%	2%	2%	8%	1
20–22 Jan	ICM/The Guardian	1,003	**40%**	35%	16%	2%	2%	5%	5
19–20 Jan	YouGov/The Sunday Times	1,711	**41%**	36%	9%	5%	3%	6%	5
18–19 Jan	ComRes/Independent on Sunday	2,050	**38%**	**38%**	11%	5%	3%	4%	Tie
18–19 Jan	YouGov/The Sun	1,752	**41%**	38%	8%	6%	2%	5% BNP on 1%	3
17–18 Jan	YouGov/The Sun	1,699	**40%**	39%	7%	5%	2%	6% BNP on 1%	1
15–17 Jan	YouGov/The Sun	1,707	39%	**40%**	8%	4%	2%	6% BNP on 1%	1
15–16 Jan	YouGov/The Sun	1,726	**40%**	**40%**	9%	5%	2%	4% BNP on 1%	Tie
13–15 Jan	Opinium	1,983	**37%**	**37%**	9%	6%	4%	8%	Tie
12–13 Jan	YouGov/The Sunday Times	1,761	38%	**40%**	9%	5%	2%	7%	2
11–12 Jan	YouGov/The Sun	1,761	**41%**	40%	8%	4%	2%	4% BNP on 1%	1
10–11 Jan	YouGov/The Sun	1,709	**40%**	38%	10%	4%	2%	6% BNP on 1%	2
9–10 Jan	YouGov/The Sun	1,767	**40%**	**40%**	10%	4%	2%	4% BNP on 1%	Tie
8–9 Jan	YouGov/The Sun	1,727	39%	**41%**	10%	3%	2%	5% BNP on 0%	2
5–6 Jan	YouGov/The Sunday Times	1,715	38%	**40%**	10%	5%	2%	5%	2
4–5 Jan	YouGov/The Sun	1,766	39%	**41%**	11%	3%	2%	4% BNP on 1%	2
3–5 Jan	Opinium	1,963	36%	**37%**	9%	7%	4%	7%	1
3–4 Jan	YouGov/The Sun	1,772	38%	**42%**	10%	5%	2%	4% BNP on 1%	4
2–3 Jan	YouGov/The Sun	1,762	39%	**41%**	9%	4%	2%	6% BNP on 1%	2

=== 2011 ===
Date(s) conducted	Polling organisation/client	Sample size	Con	Lab	LD	UKIP	Grn	Others	Lead
21–22 Dec	YouGov/The Sun	1,721	**40%**	**40%**	9%	4%	2%	5% BNP on 1%	Tie
20–21 Dec	YouGov/The Sun	1,767	**40%**	**40%**	10%	4%	3%	5% BNP on 1%	Tie
20–21 Dec	ICM/The Guardian	1,003	**37%**	36%	15%	3%	2%	10%	1
19–20 Dec	YouGov/The Sun	1,759	39%	**40%**	10%	4%	2%	5% BNP on 1%	1
18–19 Dec	YouGov/The Sun	1,721	38%	**42%**	9%	3%	2%	5% BNP on 1%	4
16–19 Dec	TNS-BMRB	1,231	35%	**38%**	11%	3%	13%		3
16–18 Dec	Populus/The Times	1,516	35%	**39%**	12%	2%	4%	10%	4
15–16 Dec	YouGov/The Sunday Times	1,724	39%	**42%**	9%	4%	2%	5%	3
15 Dec	Feltham and Heston by-election (Lab hold)								
14–15 Dec	YouGov/The Sun	1,744	**41%**	40%	10%	4%	2%	6% BNP on 1%	1
14–15 Dec	ICM/The Sunday Telegraph	1,008	**40%**	34%	14%	3%	2%	5%	6
13–14 Dec	YouGov/The Sun	1,751	**40%**	38%	10%	5%	2%	5% BNP on 1%	2
12–13 Dec	YouGov/The Sun	1,704	**41%**	39%	10%	3%	2%	5%	2
11–12 Dec	YouGov/The Sun	1,724	39%	**40%**	10%	4%	2%	5% BNP on 1%	1
10–12 Dec	Ipsos MORI/Reuters	530	**41%**	39%	11%	2%	2%	6%	2
9–11 Dec	ComRes/The Independent	1,002	**38%**	**38%**	12%	2%	4%	6%	Tie
8–9 Dec	YouGov/The Sunday Times	1,698	38%	**39%**	11%	5%	2%	5%	1
6–7 Dec	YouGov/The Sun	1,757	35%	**42%**	9%	6%	2%	5% BNP on 1%	7
5–6 Dec	YouGov/The Sun	1,686	37%	**41%**	10%	5%	2%	5% BNP on 1%	4
4–5 Dec	YouGov/The Sun	1,699	36%	**42%**	11%	4%	1%	6% BNP on 2%	6
1–2 Dec	YouGov/The Sunday Times	1,702	35%	**43%**	9%	6%	2%	5%	8
30 Nov – 1 Dec	YouGov/The Sun	1,748	36%	**41%**	11%	4%	2%	6% BNP on 1%	5
29–30 Nov	YouGov/The Sun	1,769	37%	**42%**	9%	6%	2%	5% BNP on 1%	5
29–30 Nov	ICM/The Sunday Telegraph	1,005	**38%**	36%	14%	2%	2%	8%	2
28–29 Nov	YouGov/The Sun	1,742	38%	**41%**	9%	5%	2%	5% BNP on 1%	3
27–28 Nov	YouGov/The Sun	1,723	37%	**39%**	9%	6%	2%	6% BNP on 1%	2
24–28 Nov	TNS-BMRB	795	35%	**38%**	9%	5%	4%	9%	3
25–27 Nov	ComRes/The Independent	1,001	37%	**39%**	10%	3%	3%	7%	2
24–25 Nov	YouGov/The Sunday Times	1,696	34%	**43%**	11%	5%	2%	5%	9
23–24 Nov	Angus Reid Public Opinion	2,006	33%	**42%**	8%	7%	3%	7%	9
23–24 Nov	YouGov/The Sun	1,718	35%	**40%**	9%	8%	2%	5% BNP on 1%	5
22–23 Nov	YouGov/The Sun	1,700	35%	**40%**	11%	6%	2%	6% BNP on 1%	5
21–22 Nov	YouGov/The Sun	1,714	35%	**42%**	9%	6%	2%	6% BNP on 1%	7
20–21 Nov	YouGov/The Sun	1,748	36%	**40%**	9%	7%	3%	6% BNP on 1%	4
19–21 Nov	Ipsos MORI/Reuters	1,006	34%	**41%**	12%	3%	4%	6%	7
18–21 Nov	Opinium	1,963	36%	**37%**	9%	7%	4%	4%	1
18–20 Nov	Populus/The Times	672	33%	**41%**	13%	4%	3%	7%	8
18–20 Nov	ICM/The Guardian	1,005	36%	**38%**	14%	4%	4%	4%	2
17–18 Nov	YouGov/The Sunday Times	1,700	36%	**40%**	9%	7%	2%	6%	4
16–17 Nov	YouGov/The Sun	1,741	34%	**40%**	11%	7%	2%	BNP on 1%	6
15–16 Nov	YouGov/The Sun	1,684	36%	**41%**	10%	6%	2%	5% BNP on 1%	5
14–15 Nov	YouGov/The Sun	1,682	36%	**42%**	7%	5%	3%	7% BNP on 1%	6
13–14 Nov	YouGov/The Sun	1,780	37%	**40%**	9%	6%	2%	5% BNP on 1%	3
10–11 Nov	YouGov/The Sunday Times	1,751	36%	**41%**	9%	5%	2%	6%	5
9–10 Nov	YouGov/The Sun	1,737	35%	**42%**	8%	7%	2%	6% BNP on 1%	7
8–9 Nov	YouGov/The Sun	1,796	36%	**40%**	10%	7%	2%	5% BNP on 1%	4
7–8 Nov	YouGov/The Sun	1,703	35%	**40%**	10%	6%	3%	6% BNP on 1%	5
6–7 Nov	YouGov/The Sun	1,715	36%	**41%**	9%	6%	1%	6% BNP on 1%	5
4–7 Nov	Opinium	1,962	34%	**38%**	10%	6%	3%	8%	4
3–4 Nov	YouGov/Sunday Times	1,561	35%	**41%**	9%	5%	2%	7%	6
2–3 Nov	YouGov/The Sun	1,678	36%	**41%**	8%	7%	2%	5% BNP on 1%	5
1–2 Nov	YouGov/The Sun	1,718	37%	**41%**	8%	6%	2%	5%	4
31 Oct – 1 Nov	YouGov/The Sun	1,673	35%	**41%**	9%	6%	2%	7% BNP on 2%	6
30–31 Oct	YouGov/The Sun	1,702	39%	**41%**	8%	5%	2%	6% BNP on 1%	2
27–31 Oct	TNS-BMRB	1,261	36%	**37%**	11%	4%	12%		1
28–30 Oct	ComRes/The Independent	1,001	34%	**38%**	14%	4%	5%	6%	4
27–28 Oct	YouGov/Sunday Times	1,676	36%	**39%**	8%	7%	2%	6%	3
26–27 Oct	YouGov/The Sun	1,672	35%	**42%**	9%	6%	3%	5% BNP on 1%	7
25–26 Oct	YouGov/The Sun	1,672	35%	**41%**	10%	6%	3%	6%	6
24–25 Oct	YouGov/The Sun	1,717	36%	**40%**	9%	7%	2%	6% BNP on 1%	4
23–24 Oct	YouGov/The Sun	1,764	36%	**40%**	9%	6%	2%	6% BNP on 1%	4
22–24 Oct	Ipsos MORI/Reuters	1,002	34%	**38%**	12%	4%	4%	7%	4
21–24 Oct	Opinium	1,957	33%	**39%**	9%	8%	4%	7%	6
21–23 Oct	Angus Reid Public Opinion	2,003	33%	**41%**	10%	7%	2%	8%	8
21–23 Oct	ICM/The Guardian	1,003	35%	**39%**	13%	3%	3%	7%	4
20–21 Oct	YouGov/Sunday Times	1,727	36%	**38%**	10%	6%	3%	6%	2
19–20 Oct	YouGov/The Sun	1,675	36%	**41%**	10%	6%	2%	5% BNP on 1%	5
18–19 Oct	YouGov/The Sun	1,739	35%	**41%**	9%	6%	3%	6% BNP on 1%	6
17–18 Oct	YouGov/The Sun	1,638	38%	**42%**	9%	4%	2%	5% BNP on 1%	4
16–17 Oct	YouGov/The Sun	1,629	37%	**40%**	9%	6%	2%	7% BNP on 2%	3
14–16 Oct	Populus/The Times	1,511	33%	**41%**	8%	5%	3%	12%	8
13–14 Oct	YouGov/Sunday Times	2,464	39%	**42%**	8%	5%	3%	4%	3
12–13 Oct	YouGov/The Sun	2,495	37%	**42%**	9%	5%	2%	5% BNP on 1%	5
12–13 Oct	ComRes/The Independent on Sunday/Sunday Mirror	2,004	37%	**39%**	10%	6%	3%	6%	2
11–12 Oct	YouGov/The Sun	2,640	36%	**42%**	9%	6%	2%	6% BNP on 1%	6
10–11 Oct	YouGov/The Sun	2,526	37%	**41%**	8%	6%	3%	5% BNP on 1%	4
9–10 Oct	YouGov/The Sun	2,740	36%	**40%**	11%	5%	2%	6% BNP on 1%	4
7–10 Oct	Opinium	1,962	36%	**37%**	8%	7%	5%	8%	1
7–9 Oct	YouGov/Sunday Times	2,448	38%	**42%**	9%	5%	2%	4%	4
5–6 Oct	YouGov/The Sun	2,723	37%	**41%**	10%	5%	2%	4% BNP on 1%	4
4–5 Oct	YouGov/The Sun	2,644	37%	**41%**	9%	5%	2%	5% BNP on 1%	4
3–4 Oct	YouGov/The Sun	2,525	38%	**42%**	9%	5%	2%	5% BNP on 1%	4
2–3 Oct	YouGov/The Sun	2,747	37%	**42%**	9%	5%	2%	5% BNP on 1%	5
29–30 Sep	YouGov/Sunday Times	2,333	36%	**42%**	10%	4%	3%	5%	6
27–30 Sep	Opinium	1,947	33%	**40%**	9%	6%	4%	8%	7
28–29 Sep	YouGov/The Sun	2,547	38%	**41%**	9%	5%	2%	5% BNP on 1%	3
27–28 Sep	YouGov/The Sun	2,627	37%	**43%**	9%	5%	2%	5% BNP on 1%	6
26–27 Sep	YouGov/The Sun	2,754	37%	**43%**	8%	5%	2%	6% BNP on 2%	6
25–26 Sep	YouGov/The Sun	2,500	39%	**41%**	8%	5%	2%	5% BNP on 1%	2
23–25 Sep	ComRes/The Independent	1,000	**37%**	36%	12%	4%	3%	8%	1
22–23 Sep	YouGov/Sunday Times	2,636	36%	**42%**	11%	4%	2%	5%	6
21–22 Sep	YouGov/The Sun	2,456	36%	**42%**	10%	5%	2%	5% BNP on 1%	6
20–21 Sep	YouGov/The Sun	2,601	35%	**41%**	9%	5%	3%	6% BNP on 1%	6
20–21 Sep	ICM/The Guardian	1,007	37%	**38%**	14%	3%	2%	7%	1
19–20 Sep	YouGov/The Sun	2,468	36%	**41%**	10%	5%	2%	6% BNP on 2%	5
18–19 Sep	YouGov/The Sun	2,611	36%	**42%**	10%	4%	2%	6% BNP on 2%	6
15–16 Sep	YouGov/Sunday Times	2,474	36%	**42%**	9%	5%	2%	5%	6
14–15 Sep	YouGov/The Sun	2,731	38%	**41%**	9%	5%	2%	5% BNP on 1%	3
13–15 Sep	Opinium	1,960	33%	**36%**	9%	8%	4%	9%	3
13–14 Sep	YouGov/The Sun	2,619	37%	**41%**	10%	6%	2%	6% BNP on 2%	4
12–13 Sep	YouGov/The Sun	2,429	35%	**43%**	10%	5%	3%	4% BNP on 1%	8
11–12 Sep	YouGov/The Sun	2,655	37%	**41%**	10%	4%	2%	6% BNP on 2%	4
10–12 Sep	Ipsos MORI/Reuters	1,008	35%	**37%**	13%	3%	3%	9%	2
9–11 Sep	Populus/The Times	757	34%	**38%**	12%	5%	3%	9%	4
8–9 Sep	YouGov/Sunday Times	2,724	38%	**41%**	9%	5%	2%	6%	3
7–8 Sep	YouGov/The Sun	2,627	36%	**42%**	10%	5%	3%	6% BNP on 2%	6
6–7 Sep	YouGov/The Sun	2,554	36%	**42%**	9%	6%	3%	6% BNP on 2%	6
5–6 Sep	YouGov/The Sun	2,552	38%	**40%**	9%	4%	3%	6% BNP on 2%	2
4–5 Sep	YouGov/The Sun	2,796	37%	**43%**	9%	5%	2%	5% BNP on 2%	6
2–5 Sep	Opinium	1,952	36%	**37%**	9%	7%	4%	7%	1
2–4 Sep	ComRes/The Independent	1,000	37%	**38%**	11%	2%	6%	6%	1
1–2 Sep	Angus Reid Public Opinion	2,005	33%	**39%**	11%	7%	2%	8%	6
1–2 Sep	YouGov/The Sunday Times	2,696	38%	**39%**	10%	5%	3%	4%	1
31 Aug – 1 Sep	YouGov/The Sun	2,588	36%	**42%**	10%	5%	3%	4% BNP on 1%	6
30–31 Aug	YouGov/The Sun	2,783	37%	**42%**	10%	4%	2%	5% BNP on 1%	5
29–30 Aug	YouGov/The Sun	2,449	39%	**40%**	10%	4%	2%	6% BNP on 2%	1
25–26 Aug	YouGov/The Sunday Times	2,657	38%	**41%**	9%	5%	2%	6%	3
24–25 Aug	YouGov/The Sun	2,530	37%	**42%**	9%	4%	2%	4% BNP on 1%	5
23–24 Aug	YouGov/The Sun	2,709	36%	**43%**	9%	4%	3%	5% BNP on 1%	7
22–23 Aug	YouGov/The Sun	2,585	37%	**44%**	9%	4%	2%	4% BNP on 1%	7
21–22 Aug	YouGov/The Sun	2,619	35%	**44%**	9%	5%	2%	5% BNP on 1%	9
20–22 Aug	Ipsos MORI/Reuters	476	34%	**40%**	15%	3%	5%	4%	6
19–21 Aug	ICM/The Guardian	1,004	**37%**	36%	17%	2%	1%	7%	1
18–19 Aug	YouGov/Sunday Times	2,464	36%	**40%**	11%	5%	2%	6%	4
16–19 Aug	Opinium	1,978	37%	**38%**	9%	6%	4%	7%	1
17–18 Aug	YouGov/The Sun	2,608	36%	**44%**	9%	5%	2%	4% BNP on 1%	8
17–18 Aug	ComRes/The Independent on Sunday/Sunday Mirror	2,028	38%	**40%**	11%	5%	2%	6%	2
16–17 Aug	YouGov/The Sun	2,783	35%	**44%**	9%	5%	2%	5% BNP on 1%	9
15–16 Aug	YouGov/The Sun	2,665	36%	**42%**	10%	5%	2%	5% BNP on 1%	6
14–15 Aug	YouGov/The Sun	2,847	35%	**43%**	9%	5%	2%	4% BNP on 1%	8
11–12 Aug	YouGov/Sunday Times	2,656	36%	**43%**	9%	5%	1%	5%	7
10–11 Aug	YouGov/The Sun	2,075	35%	**43%**	9%	5%	2%	6% BNP on 2%	8
9–11 Aug	Opinium	1,963	34%	**38%**	9%	8%	4%	7%	4
9–10 Aug	YouGov/The Sun	2,700	36%	**43%**	9%	5%	2%	6% BNP on 2%	7
8–9 Aug	YouGov/The Sun	2,864	36%	**43%**	9%	5%	2%	5% BNP on 1%	7
7–8 Aug	YouGov/The Sun	2,743	36%	**44%**	9%	4%	2%	6% BNP on 1%	8
4–5 Aug	YouGov/Sunday Times	2,425	35%	**44%**	9%	4%	2%	5%	9
3–4 Aug	YouGov/The Sun	2,748	36%	**42%**	10%	5%	2%	5% BNP on 1%	6
2–3 Aug	YouGov/The Sun	2,657	35%	**43%**	10%	5%	2%	5% BNP on 1%	8
1–2 Aug	YouGov/The Sun	2,776	36%	**45%**	8%	4%	2%	5% BNP on 1%	9
31 Jul – 1 Aug	YouGov/The Sun	2,820	35%	**42%**	11%	5%	2%	6% BNP on 1%	7
28–29 Jul	YouGov/Sunday Times	2,529	35%	**44%**	10%	4%	2%	6%	9
27–28 Jul	YouGov/The Sun	2,699	36%	**42%**	11%	5%	2%	5% BNP on 1%	6
26–27 Jul	YouGov/The Sun	2,733	36%	**43%**	8%	5%	2%	5% BNP on 2%	7
25–26 Jul	YouGov/The Sun	2,615	35%	**44%**	9%	5%	2%	4% BNP on 1%	9
24–25 Jul	YouGov/The Sun	2,783	37%	**41%**	10%	4%	2%	5% BNP on 2%	4
22–24 Jul	ComRes/The Independent	1,002	34%	**40%**	13%	4%	4%	6%	6
21–22 Jul	YouGov/Sunday Times	2,749	35%	**43%**	10%	5%	2%	4%	8
20–21 Jul	YouGov/The Sun	2,684	36%	**44%**	9%	5%	2%	3% BNP on 1%	8
19–20 Jul	YouGov/The Sun	2,853	35%	**43%**	11%	4%	2%	4% BNP on 1%	8
19–20 Jul	Angus Reid Public Opinion	2,002	34%	**41%**	10%	6%	3%	7%	7
18–19 Jul	YouGov/The Sun	2,696	36%	**43%**	8%	6%	2%	5% BNP on 1%	7
17–18 Jul	YouGov/The Sun	2,810	37%	**42%**	9%	5%	2%	5% BNP on 1%	5
16–18 Jul	Ipsos MORI/Reuters	1,001	32%	**39%**	11%	4%	5%	9%	7
15–17 Jul	ICM/The Guardian	1,003	**37%**	36%	16%	3%	2%	6%	1
15–17 Jul	Populus/The Times	800	34%	**39%**	11%	3%	3%	10%	5
14–15 Jul	YouGov/Sunday Times	2,046	36%	**42%**	11%	4%	2%	5%	6
13–14 Jul	YouGov/The Sun	2,577	36%	**43%**	9%	4%	2%	5% BNP on 2%	7
13–14 Jul	ComRes/The Independent on Sunday/Sunday Mirror	2,009	36%	**40%**	10%	5%	3%	6%	4
12–13 Jul	YouGov/The Sun	2,578	35%	**43%**	10%	5%	2%	5% BNP on 1%	8
11–12 Jul	YouGov/The Sun	2,655	37%	**42%**	9%	4%	2%	6% BNP on 1%	5
10–11 Jul	YouGov/The Sun	2,571	35%	**43%**	10%	5%	2%	5% BNP on 1%	8
7–8 Jul	YouGov/Sunday Times	2,741	35%	**44%**	8%	5%	2%	5%	9
6–7 Jul	YouGov/The Sun	2,759	37%	**43%**	8%	5%	2%	5% BNP on 1%	6
5–6 Jul	YouGov/The Sun	2,839	35%	**43%**	9%	5%	3%	6% BNP on 2%	8
4–5 Jul	YouGov/The Sun	2,738	35%	**43%**	10%	5%	2%	4% BNP on 1%	8
3–4 Jul	YouGov/The Sun	2,864	37%	**43%**	9%	5%	2%	5% BNP on 1%	6
30 Jun – 1 Jul	YouGov/Sunday Times	2,785	36%	**42%**	9%	5%	2%	6%	6
30 Jun	Inverclyde by-election (Lab hold)								
29–30 Jun	YouGov/The Sun	2,707	37%	**42%**	8%	5%	3%	6% BNP on 2%	5
28–29 Jun	YouGov/The Sun	2,699	37%	**41%**	10%	5%	2%	5% BNP on 1%	4
27–28 Jun	YouGov/The Sun	2,573	36%	**43%**	8%	6%	2%	5% BNP on 1%	7
26–27 Jun	YouGov/The Sun	3,007	37%	**42%**	10%	4%	2%	4% BNP on 1%	5
24–26 Jun	ComRes/The Independent	641	36%	**40%**	11%	3%	4%	6%	4
23–24 Jun	YouGov/Sunday Times	2,767	36%	**43%**	9%	4%	2%	6%	7
22–23 Jun	YouGov/The Sun	2,834	37%	**42%**	9%	5%	2%	5% BNP on 2%	5
21–22 Jun	YouGov/The Sun	2,774	36%	**42%**	9%	5%	3%	6% BNP on 2%	6
20–21 Jun	YouGov/The Sun	2,732	37%	**42%**	8%	5%	2%	5% BNP on 1%	5
19–20 Jun	YouGov/The Sun	2,847	37%	**43%**	9%	5%	2%	5% BNP on 1%	6
17–19 Jun	ICM/The Guardian	1,000	37%	**39%**	12%	2%	3%	7%	2
16–17 Jun	YouGov/Sunday Times	2,451	37%	**42%**	10%	5%	2%	5%	5
15–16 Jun	YouGov/The Sun	2,691	37%	**43%**	9%	4%	3%	5% BNP on 1%	6
15–16 Jun	ComRes/The Independent on Sunday/Sunday Mirror	1,457	**37%**	**37%**	11%	4%	3%	8%	Tie
14–15 Jun	YouGov/The Sun	2,773	36%	**42%**	9%	5%	3%	5% BNP on 1%	6
13–14 Jun	YouGov/The Sun	2,706	37%	**42%**	10%	4%	2%	5% BNP on 1%	5
12–13 Jun	YouGov/The Sun	2,928	37%	**42%**	10%	4%	2%	4% BNP on 1%	5
10–12 Jun	Populus/The Times	1,508	39%	**40%**	9%	3%	3%	6%	1
9–10 Jun	YouGov/Sunday Times	2,728	37%	**42%**	9%	5%	2%	5%	5
8–9 Jun	YouGov/The Sun	2,861	37%	**43%**	8%	4%	2%	5% BNP on 2%	6
7–8 Jun	YouGov/The Sun	2,693	37%	**42%**	9%	4%	2%	4% BNP on 1%	5
6–7 Jun	YouGov/The Sun	2,704	36%	**44%**	8%	4%	2%	6% BNP on 2%	8
5–6 Jun	YouGov/The Sun	2,667	37%	**43%**	9%	4%	2%	5% BNP on 2%	6
2–3 Jun	YouGov/Sunday Times	2,579	37%	**42%**	9%	4%	2%	6%	5
1–2 Jun	YouGov/The Sun	2,935	36%	**42%**	9%	5%	2%	4% BNP on 1%	6
31 May – 1 Jun	YouGov/The Sun	2,657	39%	**41%**	9%	5%	2%	5% BNP on 1%	2
30–31 May	YouGov/The Sun	2,845	37%	**42%**	9%	5%	2%	7% BNP on 2%	5
27–29 May	ComRes/The Independent	607	**37%**	**37%**	12%	4%	3%	7%	Tie
26–27 May	YouGov/Sunday Times	2,723	37%	**43%**	9%	5%	2%	5%	6
25–26 May	YouGov/The Sun	2,756	37%	**43%**	8%	5%	2%	5% BNP on 1%	6
24–25 May	YouGov/The Sun	2,795	37%	**41%**	10%	4%	2%	6% BNP on 2%	4
23–24 May	YouGov/The Sun	2,442	38%	**42%**	9%	4%	2%	5% BNP on 1%	4
20–24 May	Ipsos MORI/Reuters	1,008	35%	**42%**	10%	2%	6%	6%	7
22–23 May	YouGov/The Sun	2,823	38%	**42%**	10%	4%	2%	4% BNP on 1%	4
19–20 May	YouGov/Sunday Times	2,691	37%	**42%**	8%	4%	3%	5%	5
18–19 May	YouGov/The Sun	2,256	38%	**40%**	10%	5%	2%	5% BNP on 1%	2
17–18 May	YouGov/The Sun	2,064	36%	**42%**	9%	5%	2%	5% BNP on 1%	6
16–17 May	YouGov/The Sun	2,515	39%	**41%**	9%	4%	2%	5% BNP on 2%	2
15–16 May	YouGov/The Sun	2,601	38%	**41%**	10%	3%	2%	7% BNP on 2%	3
12–13 May	YouGov/The Sunday Times	2,286	36%	**41%**	9%	4%	3%	6%	5
11–12 May	ComRes/Independent on Sunday & Sunday Mirror	1,460	38%	**39%**	11%	4%	3%	6%	1
9–10 May	YouGov/The Sun	2,341	38%	**40%**	9%	6%	2%	4% BNP on 1%	2
8–9 May	YouGov/The Sun	2,530	38%	**42%**	8%	4%	2%	7% BNP on 2%	4
6–9 May	Opinium	1,964	35%	**38%**	9%	7%	4%	8%	3
6–8 May	Populus/The Times	1,504	37%	**39%**	11%	2%	3%	9%	2
5–6 May	YouGov/Sunday Times	2,056	36%	**41%**	10%	5%	2%	5%	5
5 May	Local elections in England and Northern Ireland; National Assembly for Wales election; Scottish Parliament election; Alternative Vote referendum ("No" wins); Leicester South by-election (Lab hold)								
4–5 May	YouGov/The Sun	2,087	37%	**39%**	10%	4%	2%	6% BNP on 2%	2
3–4 May	YouGov/The Sun	5,725	36%	**40%**	11%	6%	2%	6% BNP on 2%	4
2–3 May	YouGov/The Sun	2,365	37%	**42%**	10%	5%	2%	5% BNP on 1%	5
28 Apr – 1 May	ComRes/Independent	606	34%	**37%**	15%	3%	5%	6%	3
27–28 Apr	YouGov/The Sun	2,070	36%	**41%**	12%	4%	2%	4% BNP on 1%	5
26–27 Apr	YouGov/The Sun	2,666	36%	**42%**	10%	5%	2%	5% BNP on 1%	6
25–26 Apr	YouGov/The Sun	2,617	36%	**41%**	10%	6%	2%	6% BNP on 2%	5
20–21 Apr	YouGov/The Sun	2,629	36%	**42%**	10%	6%	2%	4% BNP on 1%	6
19–20 Apr	YouGov/The Sun	2,346	36%	**43%**	9%	4%	3%	4% BNP on 1%	7
18–19 Apr	YouGov/The Sun	2,431	36%	**43%**	9%	4%	2%	6% BNP on 2%	7
17–18 Apr	YouGov/The Sun	3,637	36%	**42%**	9%	5%	2%	5% BNP on 1%	6
15–17 Apr	Ipsos MORI/Reuters	1,000	**40%**	**40%**	9%	3%	3%	5%	Tie
14–15 Apr	YouGov/Sunday Times	2,735	37%	**41%**	9%	5%	2%	5%	4
13–15 Apr	ComRes/Independent on Sunday & Sunday Mirror	1,533	35%	**39%**	10%	6%	4%	4%	4
13–14 Apr	YouGov/The Sun	2,555	36%	**42%**	10%	5%	2%	5% BNP on 2%	6
12–13 Apr	YouGov/The Sun	2,813	35%	**44%**	10%	4%	2%	6% BNP on 2%	9
11–12 Apr	YouGov/The Sun	2,258	37%	**42%**	9%	5%	2%	4% BNP on 1%	5
10–11 Apr	YouGov/The Sun	2,649	36%	**42%**	10%	5%	2%	6% BNP on 2%	6
8–11 Apr	Angus Reid Public Opinion	2,023	31%	**42%**	11%	6%	3%	7%	11
8–10 Apr	Populus/The Times	1,509	36%	**40%**	11%	4%	3%	8%	4
7–8 Apr	YouGov/Sunday Times	2,206	36%	**43%**	9%	4%	2%	6%	7
6–7 Apr	YouGov/The Sun	2,199	35%	**44%**	10%	4%	2%	5% BNP on 1%	9
5–6 Apr	YouGov/The Sun	2,034	36%	**42%**	10%	5%	2%	6% BNP on 2%	6
4–5 Apr	YouGov/The Sun	2,530	37%	**42%**	9%	5%	2%	5% BNP on 1%	5
3–4 Apr	YouGov/The Sun	2,484	37%	**42%**	9%	4%	3%	5% BNP on 2%	5
31 Mar – 1 Apr	YouGov/Sunday Times	2,226	36%	**42%**	11%	5%	2%	5%	6
30–31 Mar	YouGov/The Sun	2,175	35%	**42%**	10%	5%	2%	6% BNP on 2%	7
29–30 Mar	YouGov/The Sun	2,202	35%	**45%**	9%	5%	2%	5% BNP on 2%	10
28–29 Mar	YouGov/The Sun	2,198	36%	**42%**	10%	5%	2%	5% BNP on 2%	6
27–28 Mar	YouGov/The Sun	2,391	36%	**44%**	9%	4%	1%	6% BNP on 1%	8
25–27 Mar	ComRes/The Independent	1,000	35%	**41%**	13%	4%	3%	4%	6
24–25 Mar	YouGov/Sunday Times	2,214	38%	**41%**	11%	4%	2%	4%	3
23–24 Mar	YouGov/The Sun	2,456	37%	**41%**	11%	4%	2%	5% BNP on 1%	4
23–24 Mar	ICM/The Guardian	1,014	**37%**	36%	16%	2%	2%	7%	1
22–23 Mar	YouGov/The Sun	2,485	36%	**42%**	10%	5%	2%	4% BNP on 1%	6
21–22 Mar	YouGov/The Sun	2,026	35%	**42%**	9%	5%	2%	6% BNP on 2%	7
18–21 Mar	Angus Reid Public Opinion	2,023	32%	**41%**	10%	8%	10%		9
17–18 Mar	YouGov/Sunday Times	2,682	37%	**43%**	9%	5%	2%	5%	6
16–17 Mar	YouGov/The Sun	2,295	35%	**43%**	10%	5%	2%	4% BNP on 1%	8
15–16 Mar	YouGov/The Sun	2,666	35%	**43%**	10%	5%	2%	5% BNP on 2%	8
14–15 Mar	YouGov/The Sun	2,595	35%	**45%**	9%	5%	1%	4% BNP on 2%	10
13–14 Mar	YouGov/The Sun	2,634	35%	**44%**	9%	5%	2%	4% BNP on 1%	9
11–13 Mar	Ipsos MORI/Reuters	1,000	37%	**41%**	10%	3%	3%	6%	4
10–11 Mar	YouGov/Sunday Times	2,067	33%	**44%**	10%	7%	2%	5%	11
9–10 Mar	YouGov/The Sun	2,195	34%	**45%**	9%	6%	2%	5% BNP on 2%	11
8–9 Mar	YouGov/The Sun	2,436	36%	**42%**	9%	6%	1%	5% BNP on 2%	6
7–8 Mar	YouGov/The Sun	2,346	36%	**44%**	10%	5%	2%	5% BNP on 2%	8
6–7 Mar	YouGov/The Sun	1,614	36%	**42%**	9%	6%	2%	5% BNP on 1%	6
4–6 Mar	Populus/The Times	1,511	35%	**41%**	11%	5%	4%	7%	6
3–4 Mar	YouGov/Sunday Times	2,413	35%	**43%**	10%	4%	2%	5%	8
3–4 Mar	Angus Reid Public Opinion	2,007	33%	**41%**	10%	6%	10%		8
3 Mar	Barnsley Central by-election (Lab hold)								
1–2 Mar	YouGov/The Sun	2,458	36%	**41%**	11%	5%	2%	5% BNP on 2%	5
28 Feb – 1 Mar	YouGov/The Sun	2,126	34%	**43%**	11%	5%	2%	5% BNP on 2%	9
27–28 Feb	YouGov/The Sun	2,549	36%	**43%**	10%	3%	2%	6% BNP on 2%	7
25–27 Feb	ComRes/The Independent	1,007	35%	**39%**	12%	3%	5%	6%	4
24–25 Feb	YouGov/Sunday Times	2,325	36%	**44%**	10%	3%	2%	5%	8
23–24 Feb	YouGov/The Sun	TBC	38%	**42%**	10%	10%			4
22–23 Feb	YouGov/The Sun	2,487	36%	**44%**	11%	3%	2%	4% BNP on 2%	8
21–22 Feb	YouGov/The Sun	2,372	37%	**43%**	9%	4%	2%	5% BNP on 2%	6
20–21 Feb	YouGov/The Sun	2,630	36%	**42%**	11%	11%			6
21–23 Feb	ICM/The Guardian	1,000	35%	**38%**	18%	2%	1%	6%	3
18–20 Feb	Ipsos MORI/Reuters	1,002	33%	**43%**	13%	3%	3%	5%	10
17–18 Feb	YouGov/Sunday Times	2,464	37%	**41%**	10%	3%	2%	6%	4
16–17 Feb	YouGov/The Sun	2,643	36%	**42%**	10%	4%	2%	5% BNP on 2%	6
15–16 Feb	YouGov/The Sun	TBC	35%	**45%**	10%	10%			10
14–15 Feb	YouGov/The Sun	2,502	37%	**44%**	10%	4%	2%	4%	7
13–14 Feb	YouGov/The Sun	2,736	36%	**44%**	10%	4%	2%	4% BNP on 2%	8
10–11 Feb	YouGov/Sunday Times	2,419	35%	**45%**	9%	4%	2%	5%	10
9–10 Feb	YouGov/The Sun	2,474	35%	**44%**	10%	4%	2%	6% BNP on 2%	9
9–10 Feb	ComRes/The Independent on Sunday/Sunday Mirror	2,009	36%	**42%**	11%	5%	2%	4%	6
8–10 Feb	Angus Reid Public Opinion	2,019	34%	**40%**	11%	6%	9%		6
8–9 Feb	YouGov/The Sun	2,339	36%	**43%**	10%	4%	1%	6% BNP on 2%	7
7–8 Feb	YouGov/The Sun	2,483	35%	**43%**	10%	5%	2%	4% BNP on 1%	8
6–7 Feb	YouGov/The Sun	2,278	37%	**43%**	9%	4%	3%	3% BNP on 1%	6
4–6 Feb	Populus/The Times	1,510	36%	**39%**	11%	3%	4%	7%	3
3–4 Feb	YouGov/Sunday Times	2,283	36%	**42%**	10%	5%	3%	3%	6
2–3 Feb	YouGov/The Sunday Times	2,051	37%	**44%**	9%	3%	2%	5%	7
1–2 Feb	YouGov/The Sun	2,409	36%	**44%**	9%	4%	2%	4% BNP on 2%	8
31 Jan – 1 Feb	YouGov/The Sun	1,922	39%	**44%**	8%	4%	1%	5% BNP on 2%	5
30–31 Jan	YouGov/The Sun	2,032	40%	**42%**	8%	4%	1%	6% BNP on 2%	2
28–30 Jan	ComRes/The Independent	1,002	34%	**43%**	10%	2%	4%	7%	9
27–28 Jan	Angus Reid Public Opinion/Sunday Express	2,323	32%	**43%**	11%	4%	10%		11
27–28 Jan	YouGov/Sunday Times	2,234	39%	**43%**	8%	4%	1%	5%	4
26–27 Jan	YouGov/The Sun	1,835	38%	**44%**	8%	4%	2%	4% BNP on 1%	6
25–26 Jan	YouGov/The Sun	2,139	39%	**41%**	10%	5%	2%	4% BNP on 1%	2
25–26 Jan	Angus Reid Public Opinion/PoliticalBetting.com	2,010	33%	**41%**	12%	6%	9%		8
24–25 Jan	YouGov/The Sun	1,816	37%	**43%**	10%	4%	2%	4% BNP on 2%	6
23–24 Jan	YouGov/The Sun	2,003	37%	**42%**	11%	4%	2%	5% BNP on 1%	5
21–24 Jan	Ipsos MORI/Reuters	1,162	33%	**43%**	13%	4%	3%	4%	10
21–23 Jan	ICM/The Guardian	1,000	35%	**39%**	15%	2%	3%	5%	4
20–21 Jan	YouGov/Sunday Times	1,699	39%	**43%**	9%	5%	2%	3%	4
19–20 Jan	YouGov/The Sun	1,860	36%	**43%**	10%	5%	2%	4% BNP on 2%	7
18–19 Jan	YouGov/The Sun	1,993	37%	**42%**	9%	5%	2%	5% BNP on 2% SNP/PC on 2% Other on 1%	5
17–18 Jan	YouGov/The Sun	1,884	39%	**44%**	8%	3%	2%	5% BNP on 1% SNP/PC on 3% Other on 1%	5
16–17 Jan	YouGov/The Sun	1,977	37%	**42%**	9%	5%	2%	4% BNP on 1% SNP/PC on 2% Other on 1%	5
13–14 Jan	YouGov/The Sunday Times	1,865	37%	**43%**	9%	4%	3%	4%	6
13 Jan	Oldham East and Saddleworth by-election (Lab hold)								
12–13 Jan	ComRes/Sunday Mirror/Independent on Sunday	2,006	36%	**40%**	10%	5%	3%	6%	4
12–13 Jan	YouGov/The Sun	1,884	**41%**	**41%**	8%	4%	2%	5% BNP on 2% SNP/PC on 2% Other on 1%	Tie
11–12 Jan	YouGov/The Sun	1,812	36%	**43%**	9%	5%	2%	4% BNP on 1% SNP/PC on 2% Other on 1%	7
10–11 Jan	YouGov/The Sun	1,857	40%	**41%**	7%	5%	2%	4% BNP on 2% SNP/PC on 2% Other on 0%	1
8–10 Jan	YouGov/Sunday Times	2,283	40%	**43%**	8%	4%	2%	3%	3
7–9 Jan	ComRes/The Independent	1,000	34%	**42%**	12%	2%	5%	5%	8
6–7 Jan	Angus Reid Public Opinion	2,010	35%	**40%**	12%	5%	2%	7%	5
6–7 Jan	YouGov/Sunday Times	1,797	38%	**41%**	10%	4%	2%	4%	3
5–6 Jan	YouGov/The Sun	1,862	39%	**43%**	7%	4%	2%	5% BNP on 2% SNP/PC on 2% Other on 1%	4
4–5 Jan	YouGov/The Sun	TBC	40%	**41%**	10%	7%			1
3–4 Jan	YouGov/The Sun	1,876	40%	**42%**	8%	4%	2%	5% BNP on 2% SNP/PC on 2% Other on 1%	2

=== 2010 ===
Date(s) conducted	Polling organisation/client	Sample size	Con	Lab	LD	UKIP	Grn	Others	Lead
22–23 Dec	YouGov/The Sun	1,635	39%	**41%**	9%	5%	2%	5% BNP on 3% SNP/PC on 1% Other on 1%	2
21–22 Dec	YouGov/The Sun	1,695	41%	**42%**	8%	3%	2%	4% BNP on 1% SNP/PC on 2% Other on 1%	1
20–21 Dec	YouGov/The Sun	2,032	40%	**42%**	9%	4%	2%	3% BNP on 1% SNP/PC on 1% Other on 1%	2
19–20 Dec	YouGov/The Sun	2,039	40%	**43%**	8%	3%	2%	3% BNP on 1% SNP/PC on 1% Other on 1%	3
17–20 Dec	Angus Reid Public Opinion	2,003	35%	**41%**	9%	5%	3%	7%	6
16–19 Dec	ICM/The Guardian	736	37%	**39%**	13%	2%	2%	7%	2
17 Dec	Opinium	–	**37%**	**37%**	12%	14%			Tie
16–17 Dec	YouGov/Sunday Times	1,966	39%	**42%**	9%	4%	2%	4%	3
15–16 Dec	ComRes/The Independent on Sunday/Sunday Mirror	2,017	37%	**39%**	11%	5%	2%	6%	2
15–16 Dec	YouGov/The Sun	1,922	**41%**	**41%**	9%	5%	1%	4% BNP on 1% SNP/PC on 2% Other on 1%	Tie
14–15 Dec	YouGov/The Sun	2,022	**42%**	40%	8%	3%	2%	5% BNP on 2% SNP/PC on 2% Other on 1%	2
13–14 Dec	YouGov/The Sun	1,810	39%	**42%**	9%	4%	1%	4% BNP on 2% SNP/PC on 1% Other on 1%	3
12–13 Dec	YouGov/The Sun	2,092	41%	**42%**	9%	4%	2%	3% BNP on 1% SNP/PC on 2% Other on 0%	1
10–12 Dec	Ipsos MORI/Reuters	1,004	38%	**39%**	11%	4%	4%	6%	1
10 Dec	Opinium	–	**37%**	36%	12%	15%			1
9–10 Dec	YouGov/Sunday Times	1,937	40%	**42%**	9%	3%	1%	6%	2
8–9 Dec	YouGov/The Sun	1,982	**41%**	39%	11%	3%	2%	4%	2
8 Dec	Opinium	–	**38%**	37%	11%	14%			1
7–8 Dec	YouGov/The Sun	1,966	**41%**	**41%**	8%	3%	2%	4% BNP on 2% SNP/PC on 2% Other on 0%	Tie
6–7 Dec	YouGov/The Sun	2,109	**42%**	39%	9%	4%	2%	5% BNP on 2% SNP/PC on 2% Other on 1%	3
5–6 Dec	YouGov/The Sun	1,991	**42%**	39%	10%	3%	1%	5% BNP on 2% SNP/PC on 2% Other on 1%	3
2–3 Dec	YouGov/Sunday Times	1,916	**41%**	39%	10%	5%	2%	3%	2
2 Dec	Opinium	–	**38%**	34%	13%	15%			4
1–2 Dec	YouGov/The Sun	1,934	**40%**	**40%**	11%	3%	1%	5% BNP on 2% SNP/PC on 2% Other on 1%	Tie
30 Nov – 1 Dec	YouGov/The Sun	2,080	**41%**	38%	11%	3%	2%	5% BNP on 2% SNP/PC on 2% Other on 1%	3
29–30 Nov	Angus Reid Public Opinion	2,004	35%	**40%**	13%	4%	8%		5
29–30 Nov	YouGov/The Sun	1,975	**40%**	**40%**	10%	4%	2%	5% BNP on 2% SNP/PC on 2% Other on 1%	Tie
28–29 Nov	YouGov/The Sun	2,114	**40%**	**40%**	10%	4%	2%	5% BNP on 2% SNP/PC on 2% Other on 1%	Tie
26–29 Nov	ComRes/The Independent	1,006	36%	**40%**	12%	2%	4%	6%	4
26 Nov	Opinium	–	**37%**	35%	14%	14%			2
25–26 Nov	YouGov/Sunday Times	1,711	**40%**	**40%**	9%	4%	2%	5%	Tie
24–25 Nov	YouGov/The Sun	2,024	**42%**	39%	10%	3%	2%	5% BNP on 2% SNP/PC on 2% Other on 1%	3
23–24 Nov	YouGov/The Sun	2,053	**40%**	**40%**	9%	4%	2%	5% BNP on 2% SNP/PC on 2% Other on 1%	Tie
22–23 Nov	YouGov/The Sun	1,968	**42%**	40%	10%	3%	2%	4% BNP on 1% SNP/PC on 2% Other on 1%	2
21–22 Nov	YouGov/The Sun	2,080	**41%**	38%	11%	4%	2%	4% BNP on 2% SNP/PC on 2% Other on 0%	3
19–21 Nov	ICM/The Guardian	1,000	36%	**38%**	14%	3%	2%	7%	2
18–19 Nov	YouGov/Sunday Times	1,967	**40%**	38%	11%	4%	2%	5%	2
17–19 Nov	ComRes/Sunday Mirror/The Independent on Sunday	2,015	37%	**38%**	13%	4%	3%	5%	1
17–18 Nov	YouGov/The Sun	2,007	**40%**	**40%**	11%	3%	1%	4% BNP on 1% SNP/PC on 3% Other on 0%	Tie
17 Nov	Opinium	–	**38%**	34%	13%	15%			4
16–17 Nov	YouGov/The Sun	2,082	**40%**	**40%**	11%	3%	2%	5% BNP on 2% SNP/PC on 2% Other on 1%	Tie
15–16 Nov	YouGov/The Sun	2,050	37%	**42%**	10%	5%	2%	4% BNP on 1% SNP/PC on 2% Other on 1%	5
14–15 Nov	YouGov/The Sun	2,050	40%	**42%**	10%	3%	1%	4% BNP on 1% SNP/PC on 2% Other on 1%	2
12–14 Nov	Ipsos MORI/Reuters	1,005	36%	**39%**	14%	2%	4%	5%	3
11–12 Nov	YouGov/Sunday Times	1,930	39%	**41%**	10%	3%	1%	5%	2
10–11 Nov	YouGov/The Sun	2,013	**40%**	**40%**	10%	4%	2%	4% BNP on 1% SNP/PC on 2% Other on 1%	Tie
9–10 Nov	YouGov/The Sun	1,933	**42%**	37%	11%	4%	1%	5% BNP on 1% SNP/PC on 3% Other on 1%	5
9 Nov	Opinium	–	**39%**	33%	14%	14%			6
8–9 Nov	YouGov/The Sun	1,936	**40%**	39%	13%	3%	1%	4% BNP on 1% SNP/PC on 2% Other on 1%	1
7–8 Nov	YouGov/The Sun	2,109	**42%**	39%	11%	4%	2%	4% BNP on 1% SNP/PC on 2% Other on 1%	3
5 Nov	Nigel Farage is elected leader of the UK Independence Party (UKIP)								
4–5 Nov	YouGov/Sunday Times	1,954	**40%**	39%	12%	3%	2%	5%	1
3–4 Nov	YouGov/The Sun	1,980	**40%**	39%	11%	3%	2%	5% BNP on 1% SNP/PC on 3% Other on 1%	1
2–3 Nov	YouGov/The Sun	2,036	**40%**	**40%**	9%	3%	2%	5% BNP on 1% SNP/PC on 3% Other on 1%	Tie
1–2 Nov	YouGov/The Sun	2,006	**41%**	40%	11%	3%	1%	3% BNP on 1% SNP/PC on 2% Other on 0%	1
31 Oct – 1 Nov	YouGov/The Sun	2,132	**41%**	39%	11%	4%	1%	4% BNP on 1% SNP/PC on 2% Other on 1%	2
29–30 Oct	ComRes/The Independent	1,000	35%	**37%**	16%	2%	4%	6%	2
29 Oct	Opinium	–	**38%**	35%	13%	14%			3
28–29 Oct	YouGov/Sunday Times	2,058	**42%**	37%	13%	3%	1%	4%	5
27–28 Oct	Angus Reid Public Opinion	2,015	35%	**37%**	15%	3%	2%	8%	2
27–28 Oct	YouGov/The Sun	1,986	**41%**	39%	11%	3%	2%	6% BNP on 2% SNP/PC on 3% Other on 1%	2
26–27 Oct	YouGov/The Sun	2,108	**41%**	39%	12%	2%	2%	4% BNP on 1% SNP/PC on 2% Other on 1%	2
25–26 Oct	YouGov/The Sun	2,651	**40%**	38%	12%	2%	2%	5% BNP on 2% SNP/PC on 2% Other on 1%	2
24–25 Oct	YouGov/The Sun	1,967	**40%**	**40%**	11%	3%	1%	4% BNP on 1% SNP/PC on 2% Other on 1%	Tie
22–24 Oct	ICM/The Guardian	1,002	**39%**	36%	16%	1%	1%	7%	3
22–24 Oct	Populus/The Times	1,000	37%	**38%**	15%	3%	3%	5%	1
21–22 Oct	YouGov/Sunday Times	1,845	**41%**	40%	10%	2%	2%	5%	1
21–22 Oct	ICM/News of the World	1,025	**40%**	36%	16%	2%	1%	5%	4
20–21 Oct	YouGov/The Sun	1,874	**41%**	40%	10%	3%	1%	4% BNP on 1% SNP/PC on 2% Other on 1%	1
19–20 Oct	YouGov/The Sun	1,936	**41%**	39%	11%	2%	2%	5% BNP on 2% SNP/PC on 2% Other on 1%	2
18–19 Oct	YouGov/The Sun	2,099	**42%**	39%	11%	2%	1%	4% BNP on 1% SNP/PC on 2% Other on 1%	3
17–18 Oct	YouGov/The Sun	1,991	**41%**	39%	12%	2%	1%	3% BNP on 1% SNP/PC on 1% Other on 1%	2
17 Oct	YouGov/Sunday Times	–	**41%**	39%	11%	8%			2
15–17 Oct	Ipsos MORI/Reuters	1,009	**39%**	36%	14%	3%	3%	5%	3
14–15 Oct	YouGov/Sunday Times	1,898	**41%**	39%	11%	3%	1%	5%	2
13–15 Oct	ComRes/The Independent on Sunday/Sunday Mirror	2,009	**40%**	34%	14%	12%			6
13–14 Oct	YouGov/The Sun	1,838	**42%**	38%	12%	3%	2%	4% BNP on 1% SNP/PC on 2% Other on 1%	4
12–13 Oct	YouGov/The Sun	1,959	**41%**	40%	11%	3%	1%	4%	1
11–12 Oct	YouGov/The Sun	2,047	**43%**	36%	12%	3%	1%	4% BNP on 1% SNP/PC on 2% Other on 1%	7
10–11 Oct	YouGov/The Sun	2,090	**42%**	38%	12%	2%	1%	5% BNP on 2% SNP/PC on 2% Other on 1%	4
7–8 Oct	YouGov/Sunday Times	1,890	**42%**	38%	12%	3%	1%	4%	4
6–7 Oct	ICM/Sunday Telegraph	1002	**38%**	34%	18%	2%	2%	6%	4
6–7 Oct	YouGov/The Sun	1,903	**42%**	38%	12%	3%	1%	5% BNP on 2% SNP/PC on 2% Other on 1%	4
5–6 Oct	YouGov/The Sun	1,955	**42%**	40%	11%	3%	1%	4% BNP on 1% SNP/PC on 2% Other on 1%	2
4–5 Oct	YouGov/The Sun	2,057	**43%**	39%	11%	2%	1%	3% BNP on 1% SNP/PC on 2% Other on 0%	4
3–4 Oct	YouGov/The Sun	2,108	**41%**	39%	12%	3%	1%	4% BNP on 1% SNP/PC on 2% Other on 1%	2
30 Sep – 1 Oct	YouGov/Sunday Times	1,796	39%	**41%**	11%	2%	2%	4%	2
30 Sep – 1 Oct	Angus Reid Public Opinion	2,004	35%	**38%**	16%	4%	7%		3
29 Sep – 1 Oct	ComRes/The Independent	2,035	**39%**	36%	15%	4%	3%	10%	3
29–30 Sep	YouGov/The Sun	3,127	**41%**	39%	12%	3%	1%	4% BNP on 2% SNP/PC on 2% Other on 0%	2
28–29 Sep	YouGov/The Sun	1,916	**41%**	39%	12%	3%	2%	4% BNP on 1% SNP/PC on 2% Other on 1%	2
28–29 Sep	ICM/The Guardian	1,005	35%	**37%**	18%	3%	1%	6%	3
27–28 Sep	YouGov/The Sun	1,896	**41%**	40%	12%	2%	1%	4% BNP on 1% SNP/PC on 2% Other on 1%	1
26–27 Sep	YouGov/The Sun	1,948	39%	**40%**	12%	3%	1%	6% BNP on 2% SNP/PC on 3% Other on 1%	1
25 Sep	Ed Miliband is elected leader of the Labour Party								
23–24 Sep	YouGov/Sunday Times	1,905	**39%**	38%	15%	3%	2%	4%	1
22–23 Sep	YouGov/The Sun	2,013	**41%**	37%	13%	2%	2%	4% BNP on 1% SNP/PC on 2% Other on 1%	4
21–22 Sep	YouGov/The Sun	1,649	**43%**	36%	14%	2%	1%	4% BNP on 1% SNP/PC on 2% Other on 1%	7
20–21 Sep	YouGov/The Sun	1,963	**39%**	**39%**	13%	3%	1%	4% BNP on 1% SNP/PC on 2% Other on 1%	Tie
19–20 Sep	YouGov/The Sun	2,156	**42%**	38%	11%	3%	2%	4% BNP on 1% SNP/PC on 2% Other on 1%	4
17 Sep	Opinium	–	**37%**	35%	13%	15%			2
16–17 Sep	YouGov/Sunday Times	1,984	**41%**	39%	13%	3%	1%	3%	3
14–16 Sep	ComRes/Sunday Mirror/The Independent on Sunday	2,028	**37%**	35%	15%	13%			2
15–16 Sep	YouGov/The Sun	1,996	**41%**	38%	12%	3%	2%	5% BNP on 2% SNP/PC on 2% Other on 1%	3
14–15 Sep	YouGov/The Sun	1,971	**42%**	39%	12%	2%	2%	2% BNP on 1% SNP/PC on 1% Other on 0%	3
13–14 Sep	YouGov/The Sun	1,913	**40%**	39%	12%	2%	1%	5% BNP on 2% SNP/PC on 3% Other on 0%	2
12–13 Sep	YouGov/The Sun	2,108	**41%**	38%	12%	2%	2%	4% BNP on 1% SNP/PC on 2% Other on 1%	3
10–12 Sep	Populus/The Times	1,508	**39%**	37%	14%	2%	2%	5%	2
10–12 Sep	Ipsos MORI/Reuters	1,004	**37%**	**37%**	15%	2%	3%	6%	Tie
9–10 Sep	YouGov/Sunday Times	1,858	**42%**	38%	14%	2%	1%	3%	4
8–9 Sep	YouGov/The Sun	1,948	**42%**	37%	14%	2%	1%	4% BNP on 1% SNP/PC on 2% Other on 1%	5
7–8 Sep	YouGov/The Sun	1,967	**43%**	38%	12%	2%	2%	3% BNP on 1% SNP/PC on 1% Other on 1%	5
6–7 Sep	YouGov/The Sun	2,089	**42%**	38%	13%	2%	1%	4% BNP on 2% SNP/PC on 2% Other on 0%	4
5–6 Sep	YouGov/The Sun	2,089	**42%**	37%	13%	3%	1%	4% BNP on 1% SNP/PC on 2% Other on 1%	5
3–5 Sep	ComRes/The Independent	1,000	**38%**	34%	18%	10%			4
2–3 Sep	YouGov/Sunday Times	1,849	**42%**	37%	12%	3%	2%	4%	5
1–2 Sep	YouGov/The Sun	–	**42%**	37%	12%	9%			5
31 Aug – 1 Sep	YouGov/The Sun	1,923	**43%**	37%	12%	3%	2%	3% 2% BNP on 1% SNP/PC on 2% Other on 1%	6
30–31 Aug	YouGov/The Sun	1,548	**43%**	38%	11%	2%	1%	4% BNP on 2% SNP/PC on 2% Other on 0%	5
26–27 Aug	YouGov/Sunday Times	1,872	**41%**	37%	13%	3%	1%	4%	4
25–26 Aug	YouGov/The Sun	2,046	**42%**	37%	12%	3%	1%	5% 2% BNP on 2% SNP/PC on 2% Other on 1%	5
24–25 Aug	YouGov/The Sun	2,030	**42%**	37%	12%	2%	2%	4% BNP on 1% SNP/PC on 2% Other on 1%	5
23–24 Aug	YouGov/The Sun	2,011	**41%**	38%	13%	3%	1%	4% BNP on 1% SNP/PC on 2% Other on 1%	3
22–23 Aug	YouGov/The Sun	2,088	**41%**	39%	12%	4%	2%	3% BNP on 1% SNP/PC on 2% Other on 0%	2
19–20 Aug	YouGov/Sunday Times	1,953	**41%**	38%	12%	3%	1%	4%	3
18–19 Aug	YouGov/The Sun	1,970	**41%**	37%	14%	3%	1%	5% BNP on 2% SNP/PC on 2% Other on 1%	4
17–18 Aug	YouGov/The Sun	2,095	**44%**	36%	12%	2%	1%	4% BNP on 1% SNP/PC on 2% Other on 1%	8
16–17 Aug	YouGov/The Sun	2,059	**42%**	37%	14%	2%	1%	4% BNP on 2% SNP/PC on 1% Other on 1%	5
15–16 Aug	YouGov/The Sun	2,125	**41%**	37%	15%	2%	1%	3% BNP on 1% SNP/PC on 1% Other on 1%	4
13–15 Aug	ICM/The Guardian	1,001	**37%**	**37%**	18%	2%	2%	4%	Tie
13–15 Aug	ComRes/Daily Mirror/GMTV	939	**39%**	33%	15%	2%	3%	8%	6
13 Aug	Opinium	–	**39%**	30%	16%	15%			9
12–13 Aug	YouGov/Sunday Times	1,865	**42%**	37%	13%	2%	1%	4%	5
11–12 Aug	YouGov/The Sun	2,000	**42%**	37%	14%	3%	1%	4% BNP on 2% SNP/PC on 2% Other on 0%	5
10–11 Aug	YouGov/The Sun	1,940	**41%**	37%	15%	2%	2%	5% BNP on 2% SNP/PC on 2% Other on 1%	4
9–10 Aug	YouGov/The Sun	2,008	**42%**	38%	14%	2%	1%	5% BNP on 2% SNP/PC on 2% Other on 1%	4
8–9 Aug	YouGov/The Sun	2,241	**40%**	36%	15%	3%	1%	5% BNP on 2% SNP/PC on 2% Other on 1%	4
6–8 Aug	ComRes/The Independent	1,004	**39%**	33%	16%	2%	4%	7%	6
5–6 Aug	YouGov/Sunday Times	1,906	**42%**	36%	13%	3%	1%	4%	6
4–5 Aug	YouGov/The Sun	–	**44%**	36%	13%	7%			8
3–4 Aug	YouGov/The Sun	2,137	**42%**	36%	13%	3%	2%	4% BNP on 2% SNP/PC on 1% Other on 1%	6
2–3 Aug	YouGov/The Sun	2,101	**41%**	36%	13%	3%	2%	5% BNP on 2% SNP/PC on 2% Other on 1%	5
1–2 Aug	YouGov/The Sun	2,216	**42%**	38%	12%	2%	1%	5% BNP on 2% SNP/PC on 2% Other on 1%	4
29–30 Jul	YouGov/Sunday Times	1,885	**42%**	38%	12%	2%	1%	4%	4
27–28 Jul	YouGov/The Sun	1,900	**42%**	36%	14%	3%	2%	3% BNP on 1% SNP/PC on 2% Other on 0%	6
26–27 Jul	YouGov/The Sun	2,028	**42%**	37%	14%	2%	1%	4% BNP on 2% SNP/PC on 2% Other on 0%	5
25–26 Jul	YouGov/The Sun	2,143	**42%**	35%	15%	3%	2%	4% BNP on 1% SNP/PC on 2% Other on 1%	7
23–25 Jul	ICM/The Guardian	1,009	**38%**	34%	19%	1%	2%	5%	4
23–25 Jul	Ipsos MORI/Reuters	1,009	**40%**	38%	14%	8%			2
22–23 Jul	YouGov/Sunday Times	1,891	**41%**	36%	14%	3%	2%	4%	5
21–22 Jul	YouGov/The Sun	2,104	**43%**	35%	15%	2%	1%	4% BNP on 1% SNP/PC on 2% Other on 1%	8
20–21 Jul	YouGov/The Sun	2,101	**44%**	35%	13%	2%	2%	4% BNP on 1% SNP/PC on 2% Other on 1%	9
19–20 Jul	YouGov/The Sun	2,143	**43%**	35%	14%	2%	1%	3% BNP on 1% SNP/PC on 2% Other on 0%	8
18–19 Jul	YouGov/The Sun	2,007	**42%**	35%	15%	2%	2%	4% BNP on 1% SNP/PC on 2% Other on 1%	7
15–16 Jul	YouGov/Sunday Times	2,023	**40%**	37%	15%	2%	1%	4%	3
14–15 Jul	YouGov/The Sun	1,620	**43%**	34%	15%	2%	2%	4% BNP on 1% SNP/PC on 2% Other on 1%	9
13–14 Jul	YouGov/The Sun	2,185	**43%**	34%	15%	3%	1%	3% BNP on 1% SNP/PC on 2% Other on 0%	9
12–13 Jul	YouGov/The Sun	2,173	**42%**	35%	15%	3%	2%	4% BNP on 1% SNP/PC on 2% Other on 1%	7
11–12 Jul	YouGov/The Sun	2,227	**42%**	35%	15%	2%	2%	4% BNP on 2% SNP/PC on 1% Other on 1%	7
9 Jul	Opinium	–	**38%**	34%	16%	12%			4
8–9 Jul	YouGov/Sunday Times	2,019	**42%**	34%	17%	2%	1%	5%	8
7–8 Jul	YouGov/The Sun	2,165	**42%**	35%	16%	3%	1%	3% BNP on 1% SNP/PC on 2% Other on 0%	7
6–7 Jul	YouGov/The Sun	2,731	**40%**	36%	17%	2%	1%	4% BNP on 1% SNP/PC on 2% Other on 1%	4
5–6 Jul	YouGov/The Spectator	2,214	**41%**	35%	16%	2%	2%	5%	6
5–6 Jul	YouGov/The Sun	1,972	**41%**	36%	15%	2%	2%	5% BNP on 2% SNP/PC on 2% Other on 1%	5
4–5 Jul	YouGov/The Sun	1,424	**40%**	36%	16%	2%	1%	4% BNP on 2% SNP/PC on 2% Other on 0%	4
2 Jul	Opinium	–	**37%**	33%	18%	12%			4
1–2 Jul	YouGov/Sunday Times	2,233	**41%**	36%	16%	2%	1%	4%	5
30 Jun – 1 Jul	YouGov/The Sun	–	**42%**	35%	16%	7%			7
29–30 Jun	YouGov/The Sun	2,138	**42%**	36%	15%	2%	2%	2% BNP on 1% SNP/PC on 1% Other on 0%	6
28–29 Jun	YouGov/The Sun	1,881	**42%**	36%	15%	2%	1%	3% BNP on 1% SNP/PC on 2% Other on 0%	6
27–28 Jun	YouGov/The Sun	1,503	**42%**	35%	16%	1%	2%	4% 5% BNP on 1% SNP/PC on 2% Other on 1%	7
25–27 Jun	ComRes/The Independent	1,003	**40%**	31%	18%	3%	2%	6%	8
24–25 Jun	YouGov/Sunday Times	2,038	**43%**	36%	16%	2%	1%	3%	7
23–24 Jun	YouGov/The Sun	–	**43%**	34%	17%	5%			9
23–24 Jun	ICM/Sunday Telegraph	1,006	**41%**	35%	16%	2%	1%	4%	6
22–23 Jun	YouGov/The Sun	1,641	**42%**	34%	17%	3%	2%	2%	8
22–23 Jun	Populus/The Times	1,003	**39%**	33%	18%	3%	2%	4%	6
21–22 Jun	YouGov/The Sun	2,295	**41%**	37%	15%	2%	1%	4%	4
20–21 Jun	YouGov/The Sun	2,042	**41%**	33%	18%	3%	1%	3%	8
18 Jun	Opinium	–	**40%**	31%	19%	10%			9
18–20 Jun	Ipsos MORI/Reuters	1,002	**39%**	31%	19%	2%	4%	6%	8
18–20 Jun	ICM/The Guardian	1,000	**39%**	31%	21%	1%	2%	5%	8
17–18 Jun	YouGov/Sunday Times	1,491	**39%**	34%	19%	3%	1%	4%	5
16–17 Jun	ComRes/The Independent on Sunday	1,004	**36%**	30%	23%	3%	2%	5%	6
10–11 Jun	YouGov/Sunday Times	1,482	**40%**	32%	18%	3%	1%	5%	8
1–9 Jun	Harris Interactive/Metro	1,906	**36%**	30%	25%	9%			6
4 Jun	Opinium	–	**42%**	28%	19%	11%			14
28–31 May	ComRes/The Independent	1,000	**37%**	33%	21%	4%	3%	2%	4
21–23 May	ICM/The Guardian	1,001	**39%**	32%	21%	2%	1%	5%	7
21 May	Opinium	–	**38%**	29%	21%	12%			9
20–21 May	YouGov/Sunday Times	1,477	**39%**	32%	21%	2%	1%	4%	7
13–14 May	YouGov/Sunday Times	1,489	**37%**	34%	21%	8%			3
12–13 May	ICM/Sunday Telegraph	1004	**38%**	33%	21%	1%	2%	6%	5
12–13 May	ComRes/The Independent on Sunday/Sunday Mirror	1,010	**38%**	34%	21%	2%	3%	2%	4
6 May 2010	2010 general election	–	**36.9%**	29.7%	23.6%	3.1%	1.0%	5.7%	7.2

== Exit poll ==
An exit poll, collected by Ipsos MORI and GfK for the BBC, ITN and Sky News, was published at 22:00 at the end of voting. It interviewed around 22,000 people across a sample of 133 constituencies.

Parties	Seats	Change
Conservative Party	316	▲10
Labour Party	239	▼19
Scottish National Party	58	▲52
Liberal Democrats	10	▼47
Green Party	2	▲1
UKIP	2	▲2
Others (Note: This includes the 18 seats in Northern Ireland.)	23	Steady
Hung Parliament (Conservatives 10 seats short of majority)

== Sub-national poll results ==
Polling was conducted separately in the constituent countries of the United Kingdom. Of the 650 seats in the House of Commons, England had 533, Scotland had 59, Wales had 40 and Northern Ireland had 18.

== Methodology ==
Each polling organisation uses slightly different methodology in their collection of data; a brief description of each company's methods is as follows:

- **Angus Reid Public Opinion** collects its data through online internet surveys, and demographically weights its data to be representative of the whole population in terms of age, gender, social class, the region of the country lived in and newspaper readership. Past vote weighting is used, and is calculated separately for respondents from Scotland and respondents from England and Wales, whilst those saying they do not know how they will vote are asked which party they are leaning towards, and any responses to this are used as a full response, whilst those still unsure being discounted from the final calculation of levels of party support.
- **BMG Research** is a Birmingham-based social research company which carried out its first political poll from 25 to 27 April 2015 for PoliticsHome, May2015 and the Electoral Reform Society, with the voting intention questions being commissioned by May2015. BMG carries out its fieldwork online and weights for past vote and likelihood to vote with people who did not vote at the previous general election weighted down by 50%. BMG Research is not a member of the British Polling Council but is applying for membership and abides by BPC rules in carrying out opinion polls. It is recognised by the BPC as a market researcher.
- **ComRes** uses both telephone interviews and online surveys to collect its data; all polls will be conducted using one method exclusively. It is not shown explicitly in the tables in this article whether a particular poll has been conducted by telephone or online but in general those polls with the smaller samples (~1,000) are telephone polls and those with the larger samples (~2,000) were conducted online. The data tables will confirm how the poll was conducted. Whatever the data collection method, all respondents are weighted according to gender, age, social class, household tenure, work status, number of cars owned and whether or not they have taken a foreign holiday in the previous three years. Both telephone and online polls are weighted according to past vote in the last general election, whilst telephone polls also use data from the last 12 ComRes telephone-conducted opinion polls. ComRes compensates for those respondents who says they do not know by asking them instead which party they most clearly identify with, whilst all respondents are weighted according to likelihood to vote on a scale of one to ten, with respondents saying their likelihood of voting is less than four being discounted entirely, and respondents saying their likelihood is more than five being progressively weighted, with a five-out-of-ten likelihood being weighted as half a response and a ten-out-of-ten likelihood being weighted as one whole response.
- **ICM** also collects its data through telephone interviews, and also demographically weights its respondents according to their gender, age, social class, household tenure, work status and the region of the country they live in. It weights respondents according to the levels of support a party received in the previous general election and the last 25 ICM opinion polls and, if a past vote is given, this is used to allocate a response to those who say they do not know how they will vote, although such a response is counted as only half of one whole response. ICM also weights its respondents as to how likely they say they are to vote, with respondents who say they are certain to vote given a higher weighting than those who are not as certain, while if a respondent did not vote at the previous general election, their turnout weighting is automatically reduced by half.
- **Ipsos MORI** collects its data through telephone interviews, and weights its respondents to be demographically representative of gender, age, social class, work status, work sector, household tenure and the region of the country they live in. Data is not weighted according to the way respondents voted at the previous general election, any respondents who say they do not know how they will vote are discounted, and only the responses of people who says they are certain to vote are included in the final calculation of levels of support for each party.
- **Lord Ashcroft** commissions and publishes polls as Lord Ashcroft Polls. On 12 May 2014 he published the first in a series of opinion polls to be published weekly up to the 2015 UK general election. These polls are carried out by telephone, and are past-vote weighted with an allowance for false recall. They are also weighted for likelihood to vote, with a proportion of Don't Knows reallocated to how respondents said they voted at the 2010 general election. The Conservatives, Labour, Liberal Democrats and UKIP are prompted for. Lord Ashcroft does not disclose the organisations which carry out his fieldwork, but states that a number are used. Initially, the methodology of the weekly Ashcroft National Poll was said to be similar to that used by Populus before they moved to polling online. He is not a BPC member; he was initially invited to join but the BPC now states that he is not eligible as he does not work for multiple clients.
- **Opinium** surveys are conducted online via web interviewing, drawing a sample of responses from the company's panel of around 30,000 people. This sample is representative of the adult population of Great Britain in the areas of age, gender, regional location, working status and social grade, as according to the latest Office for National Statistics data. Responses from different demographic groups are handled appropriately to compensate for differential response rates in these different groups.
- **Populus** conducts its surveys over the telephone, and weights all respondents according to gender, age, social class, household tenure, work status, the number of cars they own, and whether they have taken a foreign holiday in the past three years, to be representative of the whole electorate. Respondents are weighted according to their past vote and the levels of support for each party recorded in the previous 20 Populus opinion polls. Respondents who say they do not know how they will vote are allocated according to how they voted at the last general election, at a reduced weighting of 0.5 for previous Conservative or Labour voters and 0.3 for previous Liberal Democrat voters. All respondents are also weighted according to how likely they are to vote, with those certain to vote given the highest weighting.
- **Survation** opinion polling is achieved through online surveys, and all data is weighted to represent the wider population of Great Britain in terms of gender, age, socio-economic group, religion, how the respondent previously voted, and stated likelihood of voting in the next general election. Respondents who are either undecided or refuse to state how they would vote are excluded from the final results, unless they have provided details of how they have voted in the past, in which case, that information is used to adjust the results.
- **TNS-BMRB** (Note: Since December 2014, TNS's polls have been mostly branded as TNS or TNS Global.) interviews a representative sample of adults aged 18+. All interviews are conducted in respondents' homes, although the voting intention data is collected using self-completion methods. The data is weighted twice: firstly to match population totals for age, sex, social grade, working status, presence of children, 2010 voting patterns and region; and secondly, for voting intention questions only, an additional 'likelihood-to-vote' weight is applied.
- **YouGov** collects its data through an online survey, and weights its respondents to be representative of the population as a whole in terms of age, gender, social class, identification with a political party, region of the country and newspaper readership. Respondents are weighted according to how they voted in the previous general election in order to achieve a sample that is reflective of each party's level of support at that election, whilst those respondents who say they do not know who they will vote for are discounted from calculating levels of support for each party.

== See also ==
- Sub-national opinion polling for the 2015 United Kingdom general election
- Opinion polling in United Kingdom constituencies (2010–15)
- Opinion polling for the 2017 United Kingdom general election
- 2014 European Parliament election in the United Kingdom
- List of political parties in the United Kingdom
- List of United Kingdom by-elections (2010–present)
- Opinion polling for the 2010 United Kingdom general election
