= Sub-national opinion polling for the 2015 United Kingdom general election =

British political surveys, by constituent country, in 2015

Polling was conducted separately in the constituent countries of the United Kingdom. Of the 650 seats in the House of Commons, England had 533, Scotland had 59, Wales had 40 and Northern Ireland had 18.

== England ==
Date(s) conducted	Polling organisation/client	Sample size	Con	Lab	LD	UKIP	Grn	Others	Lead
7 May 2015	2015 general election	–	41.0%	31.6%	8.2%	14.1%	4.2%	0.9%	9.4
6 May 2015	Survation	919	40%	32%	11%	11%	5%	2%	8
5–6 May 2015	ComRes/Daily Mail, ITV News	866	38%	36%	9%	12%	4%	1%	2
5–6 May 2015	Lord Ashcroft	2,593	35%	33%	10%	13%	7%	2%	2
4–6 May 2015	Survation/Daily Mirror	3,566	34%	32%	10%	17%	5%	2%	2
3–6 May 2015	ICM/The Guardian (Note: Final General Election 2015 prediction poll published 7 May 2015 with an additional 463 respondents added to the data published the previous day)	1,727	37%	37%	8%	13%	4%	1%	Tie
3–6 May 2015	ICM/The Guardian (Note: Preliminary prediction poll published 6 May 2015)	1,330	38%	37%	8%	12%	3%	1%	1
4–5 May 2015	Opinium	2,493	37%	35%	8%	12%	7%	1%	2
4–5 May 2015	Survation/Daily Mirror	1,276	35%	34%	9%	17%	4%	1%	1
3–5 May 2015	ComRes/Daily Mail, ITV News	880	38%	34%	8%	15%	4%	1%	4
3–5 May 2015	BMG/May2015.com, New Statesman	887	37%	34%	10%	14%	4%	1%	3
1–3 May 2015	Lord Ashcroft	858	35%	32%	10%	13%	7%	4%	3
1–2 May 2015	Survation/Mail on Sunday	1,852	34%	35%	8%	19%	4%	1%	1
30 Apr – 1 May 2015	Survation/Daily Mirror	978	36%	34%	10%	17%	4%	<0.5%	2
28–30 Apr 2015	ComRes/Independent on Sunday, Sunday Mirror	868	35%	34%	8%	14%	8%	2%	1
28–30 Apr 2015	Opinium/The Observer	1,658	37%	34%	7%	14%	6%	<0.5%	3
27–28 Apr 2015	ComRes/ITV News, Daily Mail	872	36%	36%	8%	12%	6%	2%	Tie
25–27 Apr 2015	BMG/May2015.com	877	39%	31%	11%	15%	4%	<0.5%	8
24–26 Apr 2015	Lord Ashcroft	870	37%	32%	9%	12%	8%	1%	5
24–26 Apr 2015	ICM/The Guardian	863	39%	32%	7%	15%	6%	<0.5%	7
24–25 Apr 2015	Survation/Mail on Sunday	879	36%	31%	9%	20%	4%	<0.5%	5
21–24 Apr 2015	Opinium/The Observer	1,668	36%	33%	9%	15%	7%	1%	3
22–23 Apr 2015	Survation/Daily Mirror	1,072	36%	29%	10%	20%	5%	<0.5%	7
21–22 Apr 2015	ComRes/ITV News, Daily Mail	890	39%	34%	8%	11%	5%	3%	5
17–19 Apr 2015	Lord Ashcroft	863	36%	33%	9%	14%	5%	2%	3
17–19 Apr 2015	ICM/The Guardian	863	38%	35%	9%	12%	5%	1%	3
16–17 Apr 2015	Opinium/The Observer	1,655	38%	32%	9%	14%	6%	1%	6
16–17 Apr 2015	Survation/Daily Mirror	986	35%	34%	8%	18%	3%	1%	1
12–15 Apr 2015	Ipsos MORI/Evening Standard	600	35%	37%	8%	11%	8%	1%	2
10–12 Apr 2015	Lord Ashcroft	870	34%	36%	9%	14%	6%	1%	2
10–12 Apr 2015	ICM/The Guardian	900	41%	35%	7%	8%	8%	1%	6
8–9 Apr 2015	Opinium/The Observer	1,626	39%	35%	8%	12%	6%	1%	4
8–9 Apr 2015	Survation/Daily Mirror	838	33%	36%	9%	16%	5%	1%	3
7–8 Apr 2015	ComRes/ITV News, Daily Mail	718	36%	35%	11%	13%	4%	1%	1
2–3 Apr 2015	Survation/Daily Mirror	856	34%	33%	9%	21%	3%	<0.5%	1
2–3 Apr 2015	Opinium/The Observer	1,710	35%	34%	7%	15%	7%	1%	1
30 Mar 2015	Dissolution of Parliament and the official start of the election campaign								
28–29 Mar 2015	ComRes/ITV News, Daily Mail	864	38%	32%	9%	13%	6%	2%	6
27–29 Mar 2015	Lord Ashcroft	865	40%	34%	7%	11%	7%	1%	6
24–25 Mar 2015	Opinium/The Observer	1,690	35%	34%	9%	13%	7%	<0.5%	1
24–25 Mar 2015	Survation/Daily Mirror	851	34%	34%	8%	20%	4%	<0.5%	Tie
20–22 Mar 2015	ComRes/ITV News, Daily Mail	864	38%	35%	8%	11%	7%	1%	3
20–22 Mar 2015	Lord Ashcroft	860	36%	33%	8%	14%	6%	2%	3
20–21 Mar 2015	Survation/Mail on Sunday	861	31%	35%	10%	19%	3%	1%	4
18–19 Mar 2015	Opinium/The Observer	1,702	37%	33%	7%	14%	7%	1%	4
13–15 Mar 2015	Lord Ashcroft	863	34%	29%	8%	18%	9%	3%	5
13–15 Mar 2015	ICM/The Guardian	910	38%	37%	6%	11%	5%	3%	1
10–12 Mar 2015	Opinium/The Observer	1,654	35%	35%	7%	15%	7%	<0.5%	Tie
8–11 Mar 2015	Ipsos MORI/Evening Standard	863	34%	37%	8%	14%	6%	1%	3
6–8 Mar 2015	Lord Ashcroft	859	36%	31%	5%	18%	9%	1%	5
3–6 Mar 2015	Opinium/The Observer	1,626	36%	33%	7%	15%	7%	3%	3
27 Feb – 1 Mar 2015	Lord Ashcroft	860	36%	32%	8%	14%	7%	2%	4
24–26 Feb 2015	Opinium/The Observer	1,679	35%	36%	7%	14%	6%	1%	1
23 Feb 2015	Survation/Daily Mirror	921	30%	34%	10%	21%	3%	2%	4
20–23 Feb 2015	ComRes/Daily Mail	865	36%	32%	7%	14%	9%	2%	4
20–22 Feb 2015	Lord Ashcroft	867	32%	38%	6%	13%	8%	2%	6
17–20 Feb 2015	Opinium/The Observer	1,704	36%	33%	7%	16%	7%	1%	3
13–15 Feb 2015	Lord Ashcroft	863	31%	34%	9%	18%	9%	3%	Tie
13–15 Feb 2015	ICM/The Guardian	860	38%	34%	7%	10%	8%	2%	4
10–12 Feb 2015	Opinium/The Observer	1,713	35%	35%	8%	15%	5%	1%	Tie
8–10 Feb 2015	Ipsos MORI/Evening Standard	844	38%	37%	7%	10%	8%	0%	1
6–8 Feb 2015	Lord Ashcroft	860	36%	31%	9%	16%	7%	1%	5
3–6 Feb 2015	Opinium/The Observer	1,947	33%	35%	7%	15%	8%	2%	2
30 Jan – 1 Feb 2015	Lord Ashcroft	857	34%	30%	8%	17%	10%	1%	4
25 Jan 2015	Survation/Daily Mirror	890	34%	30%	7%	25%	4%	<0.5%	4
23–25 Jan 2015	ComRes/The Independent	852	33%	29%	9%	20%	8%	1%	4
22–25 Jan 2015	Lord Ashcroft	859	33%	34%	5%	17%	9%	2%	1
16–19 Jan 2015	ICM/The Guardian	863	32%	35%	8%	14%	10%	1%	3
16–18 Jan 2015	Lord Ashcroft	871	31%	27%	9%	17%	12%	4%	4
11–13 Jan 2015	Ipsos MORI/Evening Standard	854	35%	35%	8%	12%	8%	2%	Tie
9–11 Jan 2015	Lord Ashcroft	858	37%	29%	7%	17%	8%	2%	8
12–16 Dec 2014	ICM/The Guardian	861	31%	33%	11%	17%	5%	3%	2
13–15 Dec 2014	Ipsos MORI/Evening Standard	840	36%	31%	9%	14%	10%	0%	5
12–14 Dec 2014	ComRes/The Independent	897	29%	34%	12%	17%	6%	2%	5
5–7 Dec 2014	Lord Ashcroft	860	31%	31%	7%	23%	6%	2%	Tie
6 May 2010	2010 general election	–	39.6%	28.1%	24.2%	3.5%	1.0%	3.6%	11.5

== Scotland ==
Date(s) conducted	Polling organisation/client	Sample size	Lab	SNP	LD	Con	UKIP	Grn	Others	Lead
7 May 2015	2015 general election	–	24.3%	50.0%	7.5%	14.9%	1.6%	1.3%	0.3%	25.7
4–6 May 2015	YouGov/The Sun, The Times	1,351	28%	48%	7%	14%	1%	1%	1%	20
3–6 May 2015	Survation/Daily Record	1,660	26%	46%	7%	16%	2%	3%	1%	20
1–6 May 2015	Panelbase/Wings Over Scotland	1,013	26%	48%	5%	14%	3%	2%	2%	22
29 Apr – 1 May 2015	YouGov/Sunday Times	1,162	26%	49%	7%	15%	2%	1%	0%	23
22–27 Apr 2015	Ipsos MORI/STV News	1,071	20%	54%	5%	17%	1%	2%	1%	34
22–27 Apr 2015	Survation/Daily Record	1,015	26%	51%	5%	14%	2%	1%	<0.5%	25
20–23 Apr 2015	Panelbase/Sunday Times	1,044	27%	48%	4%	16%	3%	2%	<0.5%	21
16–20 Apr 2015	YouGov/The Times	1,111	25%	49%	5%	17%	3%	1%	0%	24
1–19 Apr 2015	TNS	1,003	22%	54%	6%	13%	2%	2%	0%	32
8–9 Apr 2015	YouGov/The Times	1,056	25%	49%	4%	18%	2%	1%	1%	24
18 Mar – 8 Apr 2015	TNS	978	24%	52%	6%	13%	<0.5%	3%	0%	28
30 Mar – 2 Apr 2015	Panelbase/Sunday Times	1,006	29%	45%	4%	14%	4%	2%	<0.5%	16
26–31 Mar 2015	YouGov/Scottish Sun	1,864	29%	46%	3%	16%	2%	2%	<0.5%	17
30 Mar 2015	Dissolution of the UK Parliament and the official start of the election campaign									
13–19 Mar 2015	ICM/The Guardian	1,002	27%	43%	6%	14%	7%	3%	1%	16
12–17 Mar 2015	Survation/Daily Record	1,027	26%	47%	4%	16%	4%	2%	1%	21
10–12 Mar 2015	YouGov/The Times	1,049	27%	46%	4%	18%	2%	3%	1%	19
6–10 Mar 2015	Survation/Unison Scotland	1,005	28%	47%	4%	15%	3%	2%	1%	19
30 Jan – 22 Feb 2015	TNS	1,001	30%	46%	3%	14%	3%	4%	1%	16
12–17 Feb 2015	Survation/Daily Record	1,011	28%	45%	5%	15%	3%	3%	1%	17
29 Jan – 2 Feb 2015	YouGov/The Times	1,001	27%	48%	4%	15%	4%	3%	1%	21
14 Jan – 2 Feb 2015	TNS	1,006	31%	41%	4%	16%	2%	6%	1%	10
12–19 Jan 2015	Ipsos MORI/STV News	774	24%	52%	4%	12%	1%	4%	3%	28
12–16 Jan 2015	Survation/Daily Record	1,006	26%	46%	7%	14%	4%	3%	1%	20
9–14 Jan 2015	Panelbase/Sunday Times	1,007	31%	41%	3%	14%	7%	3%		10
16–18 Dec 2014	ICM/The Guardian	1,004	26%	43%	6%	13%	7%	4%	1%	17
15–18 Dec 2014	Survation/Daily Record	1,001	24%	48%	5%	16%	4%	1%	1%	24
13 Dec 2014	Jim Murphy is elected Leader of the Scottish Labour Party									
9–11 Dec 2014	YouGov/The Sun	1,081	27%	47%	3%	16%	3%	3%	1%	20
14–20 Nov 2014	Nicola Sturgeon becomes leader of the Scottish National Party (SNP) and subsequently First Minister of Scotland									
6–13 Nov 2014	Survation/Daily Record	1,001	24%	46%	6%	17%	5%	2%	1%	22
30 Oct – 4 Nov 2014	Panelbase/Wings Over Scotland	1,000	28%	45%	3%	15%	7%	1%	1%	17
27–30 Oct 2014	YouGov/The Times	1,078	27%	43%	4%	15%	6%	4%	1%	16
22–29 Oct 2014	Ipsos Mori/STV	769	23%	52%	6%	10%	2%	6%	1%	29
29 Sep – 1 Oct 2014	Panelbase/SNP	1,049	32%	34%	5%	18%	6%	5%		2
18 Sep 2014	Scottish independence referendum ("No" wins)									
4–8 Jul 2014	Survation/Daily Record	786	33%	38%	5%	17%	5%	2%	<1%	5
25–26 Jun 2014	YouGov	Unknown	39%	31%	5%	16%	10%			8
6–10 Jun 2014	Survation/Daily Record	773	32%	40%	5%	15%	6%	1%	1%	8
22 May 2014	European Parliament election									
11–15 Apr 2014	Survation/Sunday Post	808	36%	36%	6%	16%	3%	1%	1%	Tie
4–7 Apr 2014	Survation/Daily Record	803	34%	40%	6%	15%	3%	1%	1%	6
6–7 Mar 2014	Survation/Daily Record	850	36%	38%	5%	15%	3%	1%	1%	2
17–18 Feb 2014	Survation/Daily Mail	805	33%	38%	6%	17%	4%	2%	1%	5
29–31 Jan 2014	Survation/Daily Mail	776	39%	30%	6%	16%	4%	2%	1%	9
4–8 Oct 2013	Lord Ashcroft	737	40%	31%	6%	18%	2%	2%	1%	9
22 Feb – 9 May 2013	Lord Ashcroft	6,659	45%	23%	8%	16%	5%	2%	<1%	22
17–28 Oct 2012	Lord Ashcroft	703	33%	39%	6%	17%	7%			6
17–20 Jul 2012	YouGov/Fabian Society	1,029	43%	29%	8%	16%	3%	3%	1%	14
18–21 May 2012	YouGov	Unknown	40%	35%	5%	14%	6%			5
3 May 2012	Scottish local elections									
22–24 Feb 2012	YouGov	1,053	42%	30%	7%	17%	4%			12
5 May 2011	Scottish Parliament election									
26–29 Apr 2011	YouGov/Scotsman	1,108	42%	28%	7%	17%	1%	2%	2%	14
19–21 Apr 2011	YouGov	Unknown	43%	30%	7%	15%	5%			13
13–15 Apr 2011	YouGov	Unknown	43%	28%	9%	16%	5%			15
25–28 Mar 2011	YouGov	Unknown	46%	26%	6%	17%	5%			20
18–20 Oct 2010	YouGov	Unknown	44%	26%	7%	18%	5%			18
31 Aug – 3 Sep 2010	YouGov	Unknown	39%	29%	11%	16%	5%			10
6 May 2010	2010 general election	–	42.0%	19.9%	18.9%	16.7%	0.7%	0.7%	1.7%	22.1

== Wales ==
Date(s) conducted	Polling organisation/client	Sample size	Lab	Con	LD	PC	UKIP	Grn	Others	Lead
7 May 2015	2015 general election	–	36.9%	27.2%	6.5%	12.1%	13.6%	2.6%	1.0%	9.7
4–6 May 2015	YouGov/ITV Wales	1,202	39%	25%	8%	13%	12%	2%	2%	14
28–30 Apr 2015	YouGov/Plaid Cymru	1,146	39%	26%	6%	13%	12%	3%	2%	13
13–15 Apr 2015	YouGov/ITV Wales, Cardiff University	1,143	40%	26%	6%	12%	13%	4%	<0.5%	14
26–31 Mar 2015	YouGov/The Sun	1,035	40%	27%	6%	9%	13%	5%	1%	13
30 Mar 2015	Dissolution of the UK Parliament and the official start of the election campaign									
24–27 Mar 2015	YouGov/ITV Wales	1,189	40%	25%	5%	11%	14%	5%	1%	15
5–9 Mar 2015	YouGov/ITV Wales	1,279	39%	25%	5%	10%	14%	6%	1%	14
19–21 Jan 2015	YouGov/ITV Wales	1,036	37%	23%	6%	10%	16%	8%	1%	14
8–13 Jan 2015	ICM/BBC Wales	1,004	38%	21%	7%	12%	13%	6%	2%	17
2–3 Dec 2014	YouGov/ITV Wales	1,131	36%	23%	5%	11%	18%	5%	2%	13
19–22 Sep 2014	ICM/BBC Wales	1,006	39%	23%	5%	13%	16%	2%	1%	16
8–11 Sep 2014	YouGov/ITV Wales	1,025	38%	23%	6%	11%	17%	5%	1%	15
26 Jun – 1 Jul 2014	YouGov/ITV Wales	1,035	41%	25%	5%	11%	14%	3%	2%	16
22 May 2014	European Parliament election									
12–14 May 2014	YouGov/ITV Wales	1,092	43%	22%	7%	11%	13%	3%	2%	21
11–22 Apr 2014	YouGov/Cardiff University	1,027	45%	24%	7%	11%	10%	1%	2%	21
21-24 Feb 2014	ICM/BBC Wales	1,000	45%	24%	6%	15%	8%	2%	1%	21
10–12 Feb 2014	YouGov/ITV Wales	1,250	47%	22%	7%	11%	9%	2%	2%	25
2–4 Dec 2013	YouGov/ITV Wales	1,001	46%	21%	8%	12%	10%	2%	2%	25
18–22 Jul 2013	YouGov	1,012	48%	23%	8%	9%	8%	2%	2%	25
18–20 Feb 2013	YouGov/ITV Wales	1,007	51%	22%	9%	10%	7%	1%	1%	29
2–4 Jul 2012	YouGov/ITV Wales	1,000	54%	23%	4%	10%	9%			31
3 May 2012	Welsh local elections									
12–16 Apr 2012	YouGov	1,039	50%	23%	7%	12%	9%			27
30 Jan – 1 Feb 2012	YouGov/ITV Wales	1,008	50%	25%	6%	11%	5%	3%	2%	25
5 May 2011	Welsh assembly election									
2–4 May 2011	YouGov/ITV Wales	1,010	50%	24%	8%	10%	4%	2%	2%	25
6 May 2010	2010 general election	–	36.2%	26.1%	20.1%	11.3%	2.4%	0.4%	3.4%	10

== Northern Ireland ==
Date(s) conducted	Polling organisation/client	Sample size	SF	DUP	SDLP	UUP	All	Others	Lead
7 May 2015	2015 general election	–	24.5%	25.7%	13.9%	16.0%	8.6%	10.3%	1.2
11–24 Sep 2014	LucidTalk/Belfast Telegraph	1,089	24%	26%	15%	12%	6%	17%	2
30 Sep – 28 Dec 2013	Northern Ireland Life & Times	1,280	20%	22%	23%	16%	14%	5%	1
7 Mar 2013	Mid Ulster by-election								
1 Oct 2012 – 10 Jan 2013	Northern Ireland Life & Times	1,204	19%	27%	21%	16%	13%	3%	6
9 Jun 2011	Belfast West by-election								
5 May 2011	Northern Ireland Assembly election								
1 Oct – 18 Dec 2010	Northern Ireland Life & Times	1,205	15%	24%	23%	21%	13%	4%	1
6 May 2010	2010 general election	–	25.5%	25.0%	16.5%	15.2%	6.3%	11.5%	0.5

== London ==
Date(s) conducted	Polling organisation/client	Sample size	Lab	Con	LD	UKIP	Grn	Others	Lead
7 May 2015	2015 general election	–	43.7%	34.9%	7.7%	8.1%	4.9%	0.7%	8.8
29 Apr – 1 May 2015	YouGov/Evening Standard	1,313	46%	33%	9%	8%	3%	1%	13
20–22 Apr 2015	YouGov/Evening Standard	1,032	44%	32%	8%	10%	5%	1%	12
30 Mar 2015	Dissolution of Parliament and the official start of the election campaign								
26–30 Mar 2015	YouGov/Evening Standard	1,064	45%	34%	8%	8%	4%	1%	11
20–26 Mar 2015	ICM/The Guardian	1,003	42%	32%	7%	9%	8%	1%	10
20–24 Mar 2015	ComRes/ITV News	1,004	46%	32%	8%	9%	4%	1%	14
27 Feb – 2 Mar 2015	YouGov/Evening Standard	1,011	44%	32%	7%	10%	5%	<0.5%	12
19–23 Feb 2015	YouGov/The Times	1,096	42%	34%	8%	9%	6%	<0.5%	8
19–21 Jan 2015	YouGov/Evening Standard	1,034	42%	32%	7%	10%	8%	<0.5%	10
15–18 Dec 2014	YouGov/Evening Standard	1,385	41%	33%	9%	9%	6%	<0.5%	8
8–13 Aug 2014	YouGov/Evening Standard	1,200	41%	34%	10%	9%	3%	<0.5%	7
21–24 Jul 2014	YouGov/Evening Standard	1,350	45%	35%	8%	8%	4%	<0.5%	10
17–19 Jun 2014	YouGov/Evening Standard	1,115	42%	35%	8%	10%	4%	<0.5%	7
6–8 May 2014	YouGov/Evening Standard	1,422	44%	31%	11%	10%	2%	<0.5%	13
29 Apr 2014	Survation	774	42%	26%	12%	15%	2%	<0.5%	16
7–9 Apr 2014	YouGov/Evening Standard	1,209	42%	34%	9%	11%	3%	<0.5%	8
8–10 Oct 2013	YouGov/Evening Standard	1,231	45%	32%	10%	9%	2%	2%	13
20–25 Jun 2013	YouGov/Evening Standard	1,269	48%	29%	9%	10%	2%	3%	19
24–30 Apr 2012	Opinium	736	43%	33%	10%	6%	7%	2%	10
27–29 Apr 2012	YouGov/Evening Standard	1,231	47%	31%	9%	8%	3%	2%	16
20–22 Apr 2012	YouGov/Evening Standard	1,138	50%	31%	8%	6%	3%	2%	19
13–15 Apr 2012	YouGov/Evening Standard	1,060	50%	33%	7%	6%	2%	2%	17
12–15 Mar 2012	YouGov/Evening Standard	1,226	46%	34%	9%	5%	3%	2%	12
7–10 Feb 2012	YouGov/Evening Standard	1,106	47%	35%	9%	5%	2%	2%	12
10–16 Jan 2012	YouGov	1,349	44%	34%	8%	5%	3%	2%	10
7–9 Jun 2011	YouGov	1,215	51%	32%	8%	3%	3%	2%	19
5–8 Oct 2010	YouGov	1,271	42%	38%	13%	2%	3%	2%	4
6 May 2010	2010 general election	–	36.6%	34.5%	22.1%	1.7%	1.6%	3.5%	2.1

== See also ==
- Opinion polling for the 2015 United Kingdom general election
