= Results breakdown of the 2010 United Kingdom general election =

2010 United Kingdom general election
- 6 May 2010
- All 650 seats in the House of Commons of the United Kingdom; 326 seats needed for a majority
- Turnout: 65.1%
Party	Leader	Vote %	Seats	+/–
Conservative	David Cameron	36.1%	306	+97
Labour	Gordon Brown	29.0%	258	−91
Liberal Democrats	Nick Clegg	23.0%	57	−5
DUP	Peter Robinson	0.6%	8	−1
SNP	Alex Salmond	1.7%	6	0
Sinn Féin	Gerry Adams	0.6%	5	0
Plaid Cymru	Ieuan Wyn Jones	0.6%	3	+1
SDLP	Margaret Ritchie	0.4%	3	0
Green	Caroline Lucas	0.9%	1	+1
Alliance	David Ford	0.1%	1	+1
This lists parties that won seats. See the complete results below.
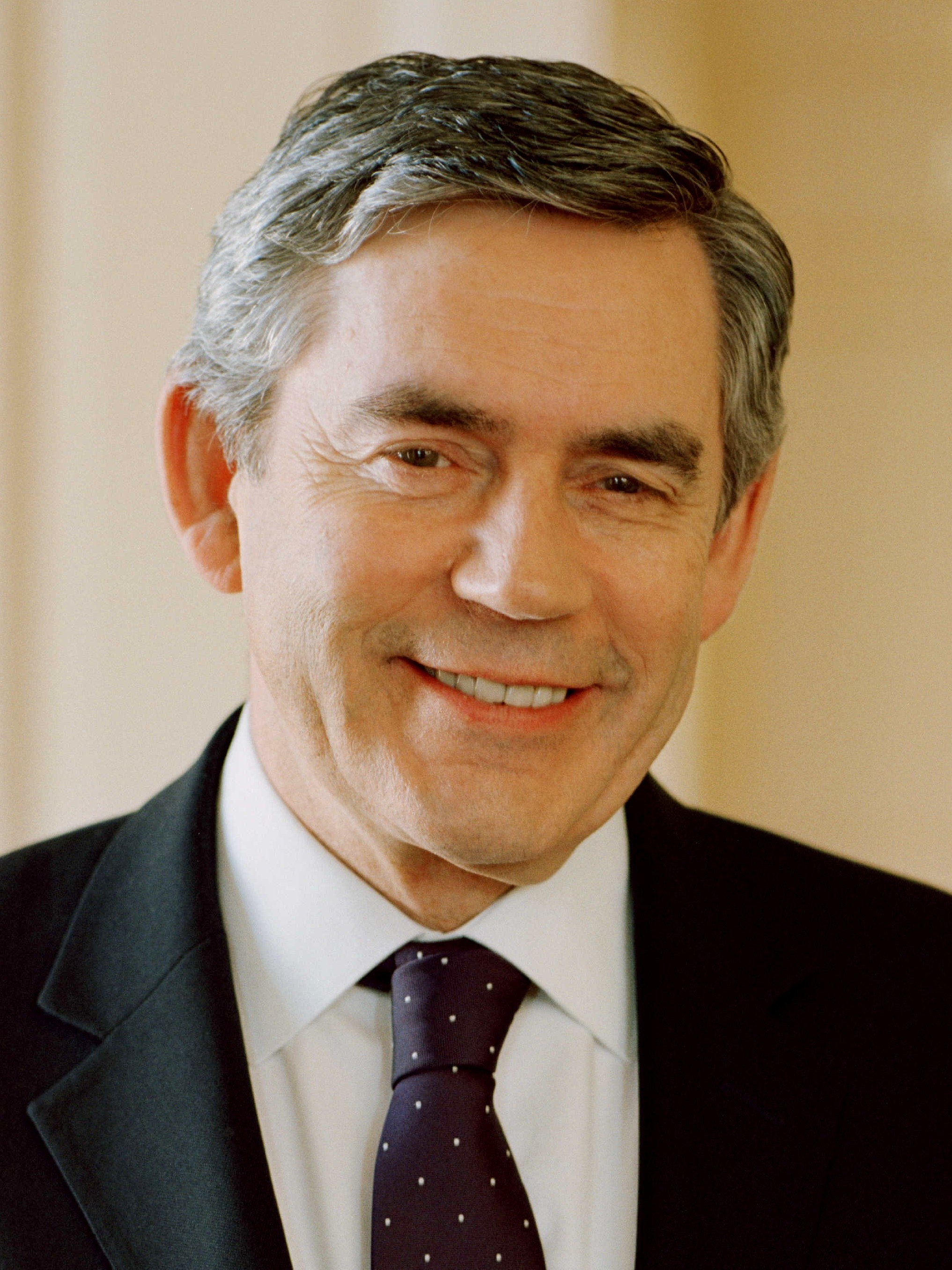

Prime Minister before	Prime Minister after
Gordon Brown; Labour	David Cameron; Conservative

This is the results breakdown of the 2010 United Kingdom general election.

== Swing ==
The election was marked by no uniform national swing, with suburban and rural constituencies showing large swings from Labour to the Conservatives, but urban seats showing much smaller swings. Scotland recorded a small swing back to Labour.

== Seats changing hands ==
The following table is a complete list of seats changing hands as a result of the election based on the notional results of the 2005 election, notwithstanding the results of by-elections to the 54th Parliament.

The Conservatives gained more seats than at any other general election since their landslide result in 1931. Labour lost a total of 94 seats, the second most seats it had lost in a single election.

Seat	2005 election	2010 election
Aberconwy	Labour	Conservative gain
Amber Valley	Labour	Conservative gain
Arfon	Labour	Plaid Cymru gain
Battersea	Labour	Conservative gain
Bedford	Labour	Conservative gain
Belfast East	DUP	Alliance gain
Bethnal Green and Bow	Respect	Labour gain
Blaenau Gwent	Blaenau Gwent PV	Labour gain
Blackpool North and Cleveleys	Labour	Conservative gain
Bradford East	Labour	Liberal Democrats gain
Brent Central	Labour	Liberal Democrats gain
Brentford and Isleworth	Labour	Conservative gain
Brigg and Goole	Labour	Conservative gain
Brighton Kemptown	Labour	Conservative gain
Brighton Pavilion	Labour	Green gain
Bristol North West	Labour	Conservative gain
Broxtowe	Labour	Conservative gain
Buckingham	Conservative	Speaker gain
Burnley	Labour	Liberal Democrats gain
Burton	Labour	Conservative gain
Bury North	Labour	Conservative gain
Calder Valley	Labour	Conservative gain
Camborne and Redruth	Liberal Democrats	Conservative gain
Cannock Chase	Labour	Conservative gain
Cardiff North	Labour	Conservative gain
Carlisle	Labour	Conservative gain
Carmarthen West and Pembrokeshire South	Labour	Conservative gain
Castle Point	Independent	Conservative gain
Chatham and Aylesford	Labour	Conservative gain
Chester	Labour	Conservative gain
Chesterfield	Liberal Democrats	Labour gain
Cleethorpes	Labour	Conservative gain
Colne Valley	Labour	Conservative gain
Corby	Labour	Conservative gain
Cornwall South East	Liberal Democrats	Conservative gain
Crawley	Labour	Conservative gain
Crewe and Nantwich	Labour	Conservative gain
Croydon Central	Labour	Conservative gain
Dartford	Labour	Conservative gain
Derbyshire South	Labour	Conservative gain
Dewsbury	Labour	Conservative gain
Dorset South	Labour	Conservative gain
Dover	Labour	Conservative gain
Dudley South	Labour	Conservative gain
Ealing Central and Acton	Labour	Conservative gain
Eastbourne	Conservative	Liberal Democrats gain
Elmet and Rothwell	Labour	Conservative gain
Erewash	Labour	Conservative gain
Gillingham and Rainham	Labour	Conservative gain
Glasgow North East	Speaker	Labour gain
Gloucester	Labour	Conservative gain
Great Yarmouth	Labour	Conservative gain
Halesowen and Rowley Regis	Labour	Conservative gain
Harlow	Labour	Conservative gain
Harrogate and Knaresborough	Liberal Democrats	Conservative gain
Harrow East	Labour	Conservative gain
Hastings	Labour	Conservative gain
Hendon	Labour	Conservative gain
Hereford and South Herefordshire	Liberal Democrats	Conservative gain
High Peak	Labour	Conservative gain
Hove	Labour	Conservative gain
Ipswich	Labour	Conservative gain
Keighley	Labour	Conservative gain
Kingswood	Labour	Conservative gain
Lancaster and Fleetwood	Labour	Conservative gain
Leicestershire North West	Labour	Conservative gain
Lincoln	Labour	Conservative gain
Loughborough	Labour	Conservative gain
Milton Keynes North	Labour	Conservative gain
Milton Keynes South	Labour	Conservative gain
Montgomeryshire	Liberal Democrats	Conservative gain
Morecambe and Lunesdale	Labour	Conservative gain
Newton Abbot	Liberal Democrats	Conservative gain
North Down	UUP	Independent gain
Northampton North	Labour	Conservative gain
Northampton South	Labour	Conservative gain
Norwich North	Labour	Conservative gain
Norwich South	Labour	Liberal Democrats gain
Nuneaton	Labour	Conservative gain
Oxford West and Abingdon	Liberal Democrats	Conservative gain
Pendle	Labour	Conservative gain
Plymouth Sutton and Devonport	Labour	Conservative gain
Portsmouth North	Labour	Conservative gain
Pudsey	Labour	Conservative gain
Reading West	Labour	Conservative gain
Redcar	Labour	Liberal Democrats gain
Redditch	Labour	Conservative gain
Rochdale (notional gain)	Liberal Democrats	Labour gain
Richmond Park	Liberal Democrats	Conservative gain
Romsey and Southampton North	Liberal Democrats	Conservative gain
Rossendale and Darwen	Labour	Conservative gain
Rugby	Labour	Conservative gain
Sherwood	Labour	Conservative gain
Solihull (notional gain)	Conservative	Liberal Democrats gain
South Basildon and East Thurrock	Labour	Conservative gain
South Ribble	Labour	Conservative gain
Stafford	Labour	Conservative gain
Stevenage	Labour	Conservative gain
Stockton South	Labour	Conservative gain
Stourbridge	Labour	Conservative gain
Stroud	Labour	Conservative gain
Swindon North	Labour	Conservative gain
Swindon South	Labour	Conservative gain
Tamworth	Labour	Conservative gain
Thurrock	Labour	Conservative gain
Truro and Falmouth	Liberal Democrats	Conservative gain
Vale of Glamorgan	Labour	Conservative gain
Warrington South	Labour	Conservative gain
Warwick and Leamington	Labour	Conservative gain
Warwickshire North	Labour	Conservative gain
Watford	Labour	Conservative gain
Waveney	Labour	Conservative gain
Weaver Vale	Labour	Conservative gain
Wells	Conservative	Liberal Democrats gain
Winchester	Liberal Democrats	Conservative gain
Wolverhampton South West	Labour	Conservative gain
Worcester	Labour	Conservative gain
Wyre Forest	Health Concern	Conservative gain
York Outer	Liberal Democrats	Conservative gain

- Due to Boundary Changes this seat was notionally Conservative, even though it was previously held by the Liberal Democrats, making it a Liberal Democrat gain.

== England ==
Of the 533 seats in England, 532 were contested on the day of the general election. Polling in Thirsk and Malton was delayed until 27 May due to the death of the UKIP candidate. The Conservatives won an absolute majority of seats in England with 61 seats more than all other parties combined, and securing an average swing of 5.6% from Labour.

Geographical representations of seats coloured by winning party can be misleading to the eye. Boundaries are drawn by number of electors not geography. This results in rural seats having a large area due to lower population density, while urban seats, with a high density of voters, are geographically quite small. A pure geographical representation of seats coloured by party can make parties with rural seats seem far more popular than urban ones. To counter this bias, the BBC published a map where each seat was an equal size hexagon.

Party	Seats	Seats change	Votes	%	% change
Conservative	297	+92	9,908,169	39.5	+3.8
Labour	191	−87	7,042,398	28.1	−7.4
Liberal Democrats	43	−4	6,076,189	24.2	+1.3
Green	1	+1	258,954	1.0	−0.1
Speaker	1	0	22,860	0.09	
Turnout:			25,047,355	65.5	

Details of results are given below:

Northumberland

Tyne and Wear

Durham

Cleveland

Cumbria

Lancashire

North Yorkshire

West Yorkshire

South Yorkshire

Humberside

Merseyside

Greater Manchester

Cheshire

Derbyshire

Nottinghamshire

Lincolnshire

Shropshire

Staffordshire

West Midlands

Warwickshire

Leicestershire and Rutland

Northamptonshire

Herefordshire

Worcestershire

Gloucestershire

Oxfordshire

Buckinghamshire

Bedfordshire

Cambridgeshire

Norfolk

Suffolk

Essex

Hertfordshire

Berkshire

London

Cornwall

Devon

Somerset

Dorset

Avon

Wiltshire

Hampshire

Surrey

West Sussex

East Sussex

Kent

== Wales ==
There were 40 seats contested in Wales. The number of Conservative seats rose from three to eight – the party gained one seat from the Liberal Democrats and four from Labour. Welsh nationalist party Plaid Cymru retained three MPs, including Arfon which the boundary changes had notionally given to Labour. Overall, Labour lost four seats but held on to its remaining 26.

Party	Seats	Seats change	Votes	%	% change
Labour	26	−4	531,601	36.2	−6.5
Conservative	8	+5	382,730	26.1	+4.7
Liberal Democrats	3	−1	295,164	20.1	+1.7
Plaid Cymru	3	0	165,394	11.3	−1.3
Turnout:			1,446,690	64.9	

== Scotland ==
There were 59 seats contested in Scotland. Every constituency in Scotland was won by the party that had won it at the 2005 election, with Labour regaining the two seats they lost in by-elections since 2005. There was a swing to Labour from the Conservatives of 0.8% (with Labour increasing its share of the vote by 2.5% and the Conservatives increasing by just 0.9%), this left the Conservatives with just a single MP representing a Scottish constituency.

For Scottish results in full, see 2010 United Kingdom general election results in Scotland

Party	Seats	Seats change	Votes	%	% change
Labour	41	0	1,035,528	42.0	+2.5
Liberal Democrats	11	0	465,471	18.9	−3.7
SNP	6	0	491,386	19.9	+2.3
Conservative	1	0	412,855	16.7	+0.9
Turnout:			2,465,722	63.8	

== Northern Ireland ==
There were 18 seats contested in Northern Ireland. Both Irish nationalist parties, Sinn Féin and SDLP, held their seats. The unionist parties, DUP and UUP (the latter contested the election as UCUNF—an electoral pact with the Conservatives), lost one seat each. The DUP lost Belfast East to the Alliance and in North Down the UUP's Sylvia Hermon left the party over the alliance with the Conservatives and retained her seat as an independent. This left the nationalist parties with eight seats, the unionist parties with eight seats (all DUP), the Alliance with one seat and an independent with one seat. It is the first time since the Partition of Ireland that unionist parties failed to secure a majority of Northern Ireland's Westminster seats in a general election. It was also the first time since Partition that a Nationalist party, Sinn Féin, topped the popular vote at a Westminster election, though winning three fewer seats than the DUP.

Sinn Féin, as an Irish republican party, refuse to take their seats at Westminster (see abstentionism). This leaves 645 MPs to take their seats at Westminster (after the Thirsk and Malton poll), reducing the effective threshold for a parliamentary majority from 326 to 323.

Party	Seats	Seats change	Votes	%	% change
DUP	8	−1	168,216	25.0	−8.7
Sinn Féin	5	0	171,942	25.5	+1.2
SDLP	3	0	110,970	16.5	−1.0
Alliance	1	+1	42,762	6.3	+2.4
Independent - Sylvia Hermon	1	+1	21,181	3.1	—
UCU-NF	0	−1	102,361	15.2	−2.6
Turnout:			673,871	57.6	−7.8
