= 2005 United Kingdom general election in Edinburgh =

2005 United Kingdom general election
- 5 May 2005

All 5 Edinburgh seats to the House of Commons
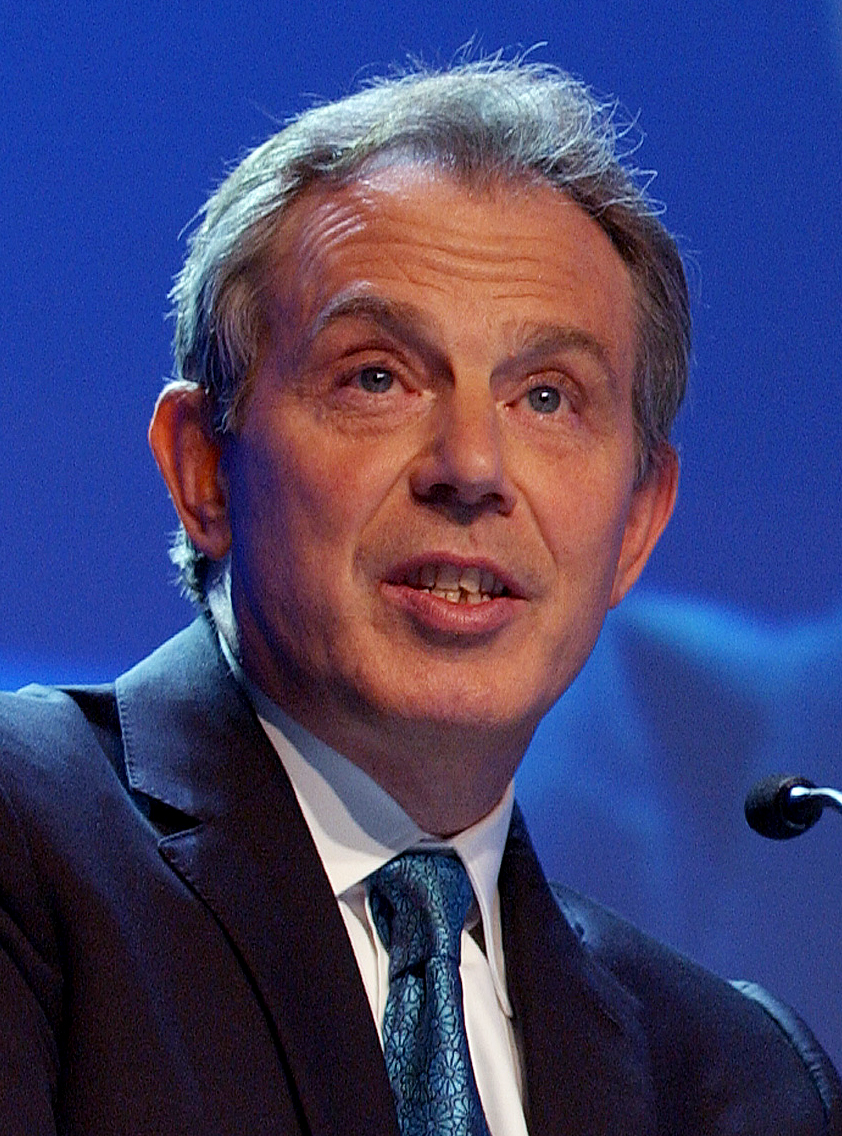

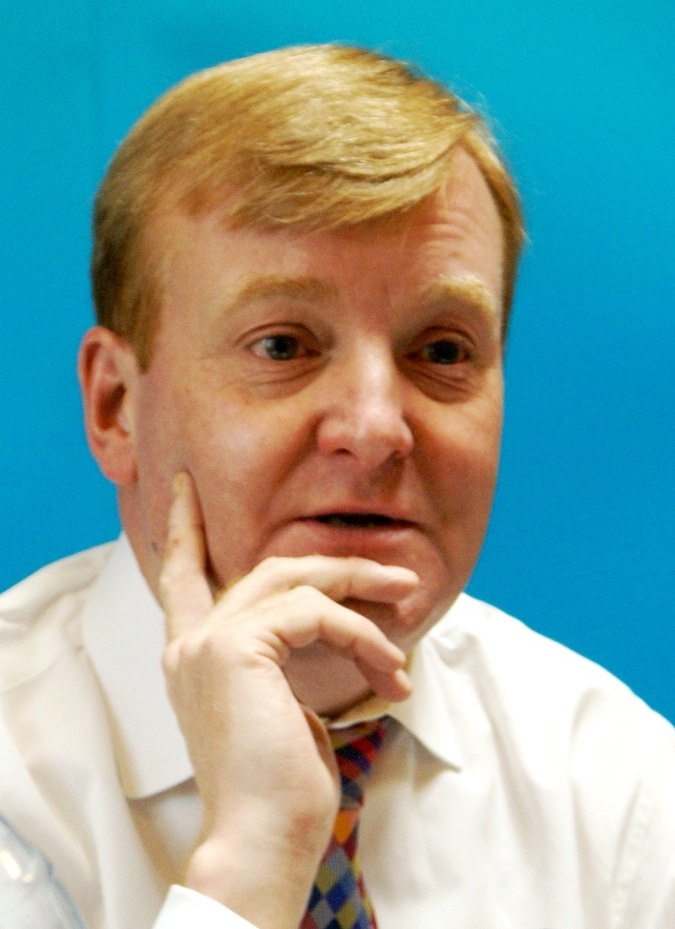

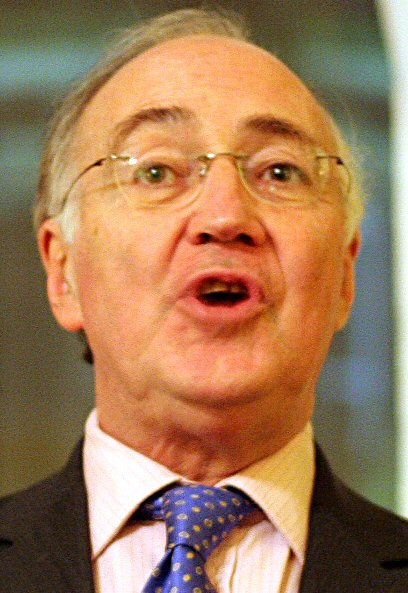

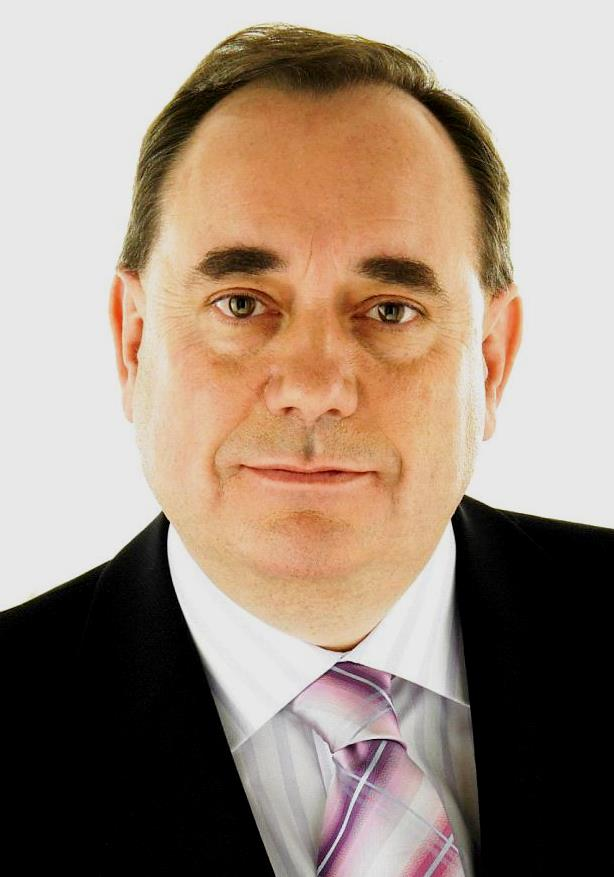
	First party	Second party	Third party
Leader	Tony Blair	Charles Kennedy	Michael Howard
Party	Labour	Liberal Democrats	Conservative
Leader since	21 July 1994	18 December 2007	6 December 2005
Last election	4 Seats	1 Seats	0 Seats
Seats before	4	1	0
Seats won	4	1	0
Seat change	Steady	Steady	Steady
Popular vote	70,593	67,593	41,404
Percentage	33.0%	31.6%	19.3%
	Fourth party
Leader	Alex Salmond
Party	SNP
Leader since	2004
Last election	0 Seats
Seats before	0
Seats won	0
Seat change	Steady
Popular vote	22,517
Percentage	10.5%
Prime Minister before election
Tony Blair
Labour
Subsequent Prime Minister
Tony Blair
Labour

These are the results of the 2005 United Kingdom general election in the city of Edinburgh in Scotland. The 2005 general election was held on 5 May 2005 and four constituencies returned Labour Party MPs, with one returning a Liberal Democrat MP.

For individual results see results of the 2005 United Kingdom general election.

== Overall result ==
Party	MPs	+/-	Seats Contested	Votes	%	+/- %
Labour Party	4	Steady	5	70,593	33.0	
Liberal Democrats	1	Steady	5	67,593	31.6	
Conservative Party	0	Steady	5	41,404	19.3	
Scottish National Party	0	Steady	5	22,517	10.5	
Scottish Green Party	0	Steady	5	8,619	4.0	
Scottish Socialist Party	0	Steady	5	3,181	1.5	
UKIP	0	Steady	1	205	0.1	
Death, Dungeons and Taxes Party	0	Steady	1	89	0.0	
Communist League	0	Steady	1	37	0.0	
Total	5	Steady		214,238	100.0	

== Results in Full ==
Constituency	Labour Party (UK)	Liberal Democrats	Scottish National Party	Conservative Party (UK)
Edinburgh East	15,899 (40.0%)	9,697 (24.4%)	6,760 (17.0%)	4,093 (10.3%)
Edinburgh North and Leith	14,597 (34.2%)	12,444 (29.2%)	4,344 (10.2%)	7,969 (18.7%)
Edinburgh South	14,188 (33.2%)	13,783 (32.3%)	2,635 (6.2%)	10,291 (24.1%)
Edinburgh South West	17,476 (39.8%)	9,252 (21.1%)	4,654 (10.6%)	10,234 (23.3%)
Edinburgh West	8,433 (18.6%)	22,417 (49.5%)	4,124 (9.1%)	8,817 (19.5%)
