= 2010 United Kingdom general election in Wales =

- 6 May 2010

All 40 Welsh seats to the House of Commons
- Turnout: 64.8% (▲2.2 pp)
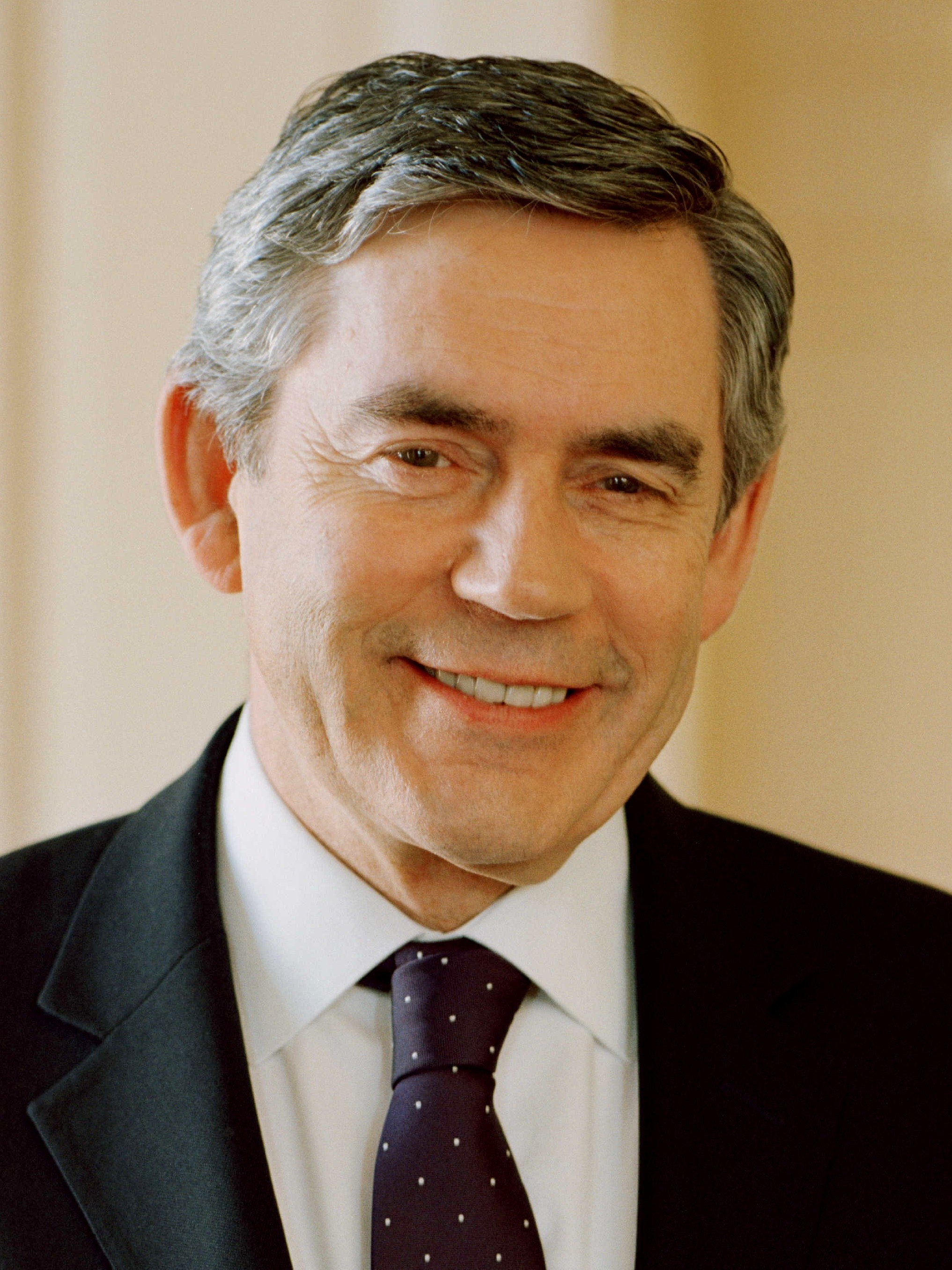

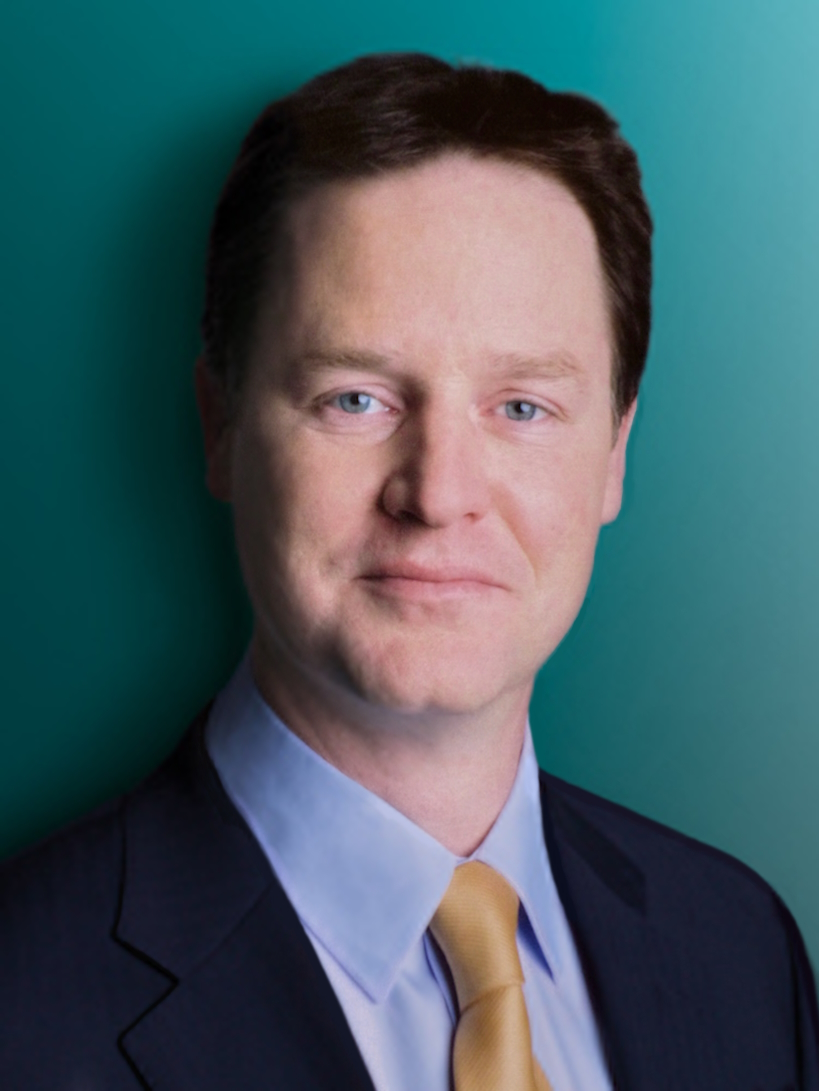

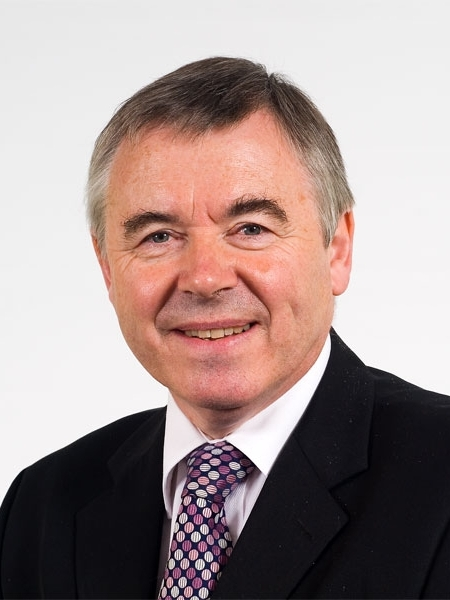
| | First party | Second party |
|---|---|---|
| Leader | Gordon Brown | David Cameron |
| Party | Labour | Conservative |
| Leader since | 24 June 2007 | 6 December 2005 |
| Leader's seat | Cowdenbeath and Kirkcaldy | Witney |
| Last election | 29 seats, 42.7% | 3 seats, 21.4% |
| Seats before | 30^{†} | 3^{†} |
| Seats won | 26 | 8 |
| Seat change | ▼4* | ▲5* |
| Popular vote | 531,602 | 382,730 |
| Percentage | 36.2% | 26.1% |
| Swing | ▼6.5 pp | ▲4.7 pp |
| | Third party | Fourth party |
| Leader | Nick Clegg | Ieuan Wyn Jones |
| Party | Liberal Democrats | Plaid Cymru |
| Leader since | 18 December 2007 | 3 August 2000 |
| Leader's seat | Sheffield Hallam | Did not stand |
| Last election | 4 seats, 18.4% | 3 seats, 12.6% |
| Seats before | 4^{†} | 2^{†} |
| Seats won | 3 | 3 |
| Seat change | ▼1* | ▲1* |
| Popular vote | 295,164 | 165,394 |
| Percentage | 20.1% | 11.3% |
| Swing | ▲1.7 pp | ▼1.3 pp |
- Colours on map indicate winning party for each constituency^{†}Notional 2005 results on new boundaries. *Owing to electoral boundaries changing, this figure is notional.

On Thursday 6 May 2010, the 2010 United Kingdom general election was held in Wales, to elect all 650 members of the House of Commons, with 40 constituencies being in Wales.

The Labour Party remained the party with the most seats in Wales, however it suffered a net loss of 4 seats and its share of the vote dropped by 6.5%. The Conservatives increased their number of seats by 5 and the Liberal Democrats and Plaid Cymru saw little change both in the number of seats and share of the vote.

Despite the Labour party winning the most votes in Wales, the Conservatives won across the UK. Also, by the share of the vote, the Labour Party got their worst result since the 1918 general election (in 1918 election the Labour Party didn't have candidates in all Welsh constituencies). Conversely, the Conservative Party had is best result by seats since the 1987 general election at 8 seats.

== Candidates ==
Below is a table summarising the candidates of the 2010 general election in Wales.

| Affiliation | Candidates |
|---|---|
| Labour Party | 40 |
| Conservative and Unionist Party | 40 |
| Liberal Democrats | 40 |
| Plaid Cymru | 40 |
| UK Independence Party | 40 |
| British National Party | 19 |
| Independent | 15 |
| Green Party of England and Wales | 13 |
| Christian Party | 8 |
| Socialist Labour Party | 4 |
| Trade Unionist and Socialist Coalition | 2 |
| Official Monster Raving Loony Party | 2 |
| National Front | 1 |
| Blaenau Gwent People's Voice | 1 |
| Communist Party of Britain | 1 |
| New Millennium Bean Party | 1 |
| Alliance for Green Socialism | 1 |
| Total | 268 |

== Results ==
| Party | Seats | | | | | Aggregate votes | | |
| Party | Total | Gains | Losses | Net | Of all (%) | Total | Of all (%) | Change (%) |
|---|---|---|---|---|---|---|---|---|
| Labour | 26 | 1 | 5 | ▼4 | 65.0 | 531,602 | 36.2 | ▼6.5 |
| Conservative | 8 | 5 | 0 | ▲5 | 20.0 | 382,730 | 26.1 | ▲4.7 |
| Liberal Democrats | 3 | 0 | 1 | ▼1 | 7.5 | 295,164 | 20.1 | ▲1.7 |
| Plaid Cymru | 3 | 1 | 0 | ▲1 | 7.5 | 165,394 | 11.3 | ▼1.3 |
| UKIP | 0 | 0 | 0 | Steady | — | 35,684 | 2.4 | ▲1.0 |
| BNP | 0 | 0 | 0 | Steady | — | 23,088 | 1.6 | ▲1.5 |
| Independent | 0 | 0 | 1 | ▼1 | — | 15,212 | 1.0 | ▼1.1 |
| Blaenau Gwent PV | 0 | New | | | — | 6,458 | 0.4 | New |
| Green | 0 | 0 | 0 | Steady | — | 6,293 | 0.4 | ▼0.1 |
| Christian | 0 | New | | | — | 1,947 | 0.1 | New |
| Socialist Labour | 0 | 0 | 0 | Steady | — | 1,155 | 0.1 | Steady |
| New Millennium Bean | 0 | 0 | 0 | Steady | — | 558 | 0.0 | Steady |
| National Front | 0 | Did not stand in 2005 | | | — | 384 | 0.0 | —N/a |
| Monster Raving Loony | 0 | 0 | 0 | Steady | — | 352 | 0.0 | Steady |
| TUSC | 0 | New | | | — | 341 | 0.0 | New |
| Communist | 0 | 0 | 0 | Steady | — | 196 | 0.0 | Steady |
| Alliance for Green Socialism | 0 | 0 | 0 | Steady | — | 127 | 0.0 | Steady |
| Total | 40 | | | 0 | 100.0 | 1,466,685 | 100.0 | 0.0 |
| Registered voters, and turnout | | | | | | | 64.8 | ▲2.2 |

Popular vote
| Labour | 36.2% |
| Conservative | 26.1% |
| Liberal Democrats | 20.1% |
| Plaid Cymru | 11.3% |
| UKIP | 2.4% |
| BNP | 1.6% |
| Green | 0.4% |
| Other | 1.9% |

Parliament seats
| Labour | 65.0% |
| Conservative | 20.0% |
| Liberal Democrats | 7.5% |
| Plaid Cymru | 7.5% |

== See also ==
- 2010 United Kingdom general election in England
- 2010 United Kingdom general election in Scotland
- 2010 United Kingdom general election in Northern Ireland
- List of MPs for constituencies in Wales (2010–2015)
