= 2010 United Kingdom general election in England =

- 6 May 2010

All 533 English seats to the House of Commons
- Turnout: 65.5% (▲4.2 pp)

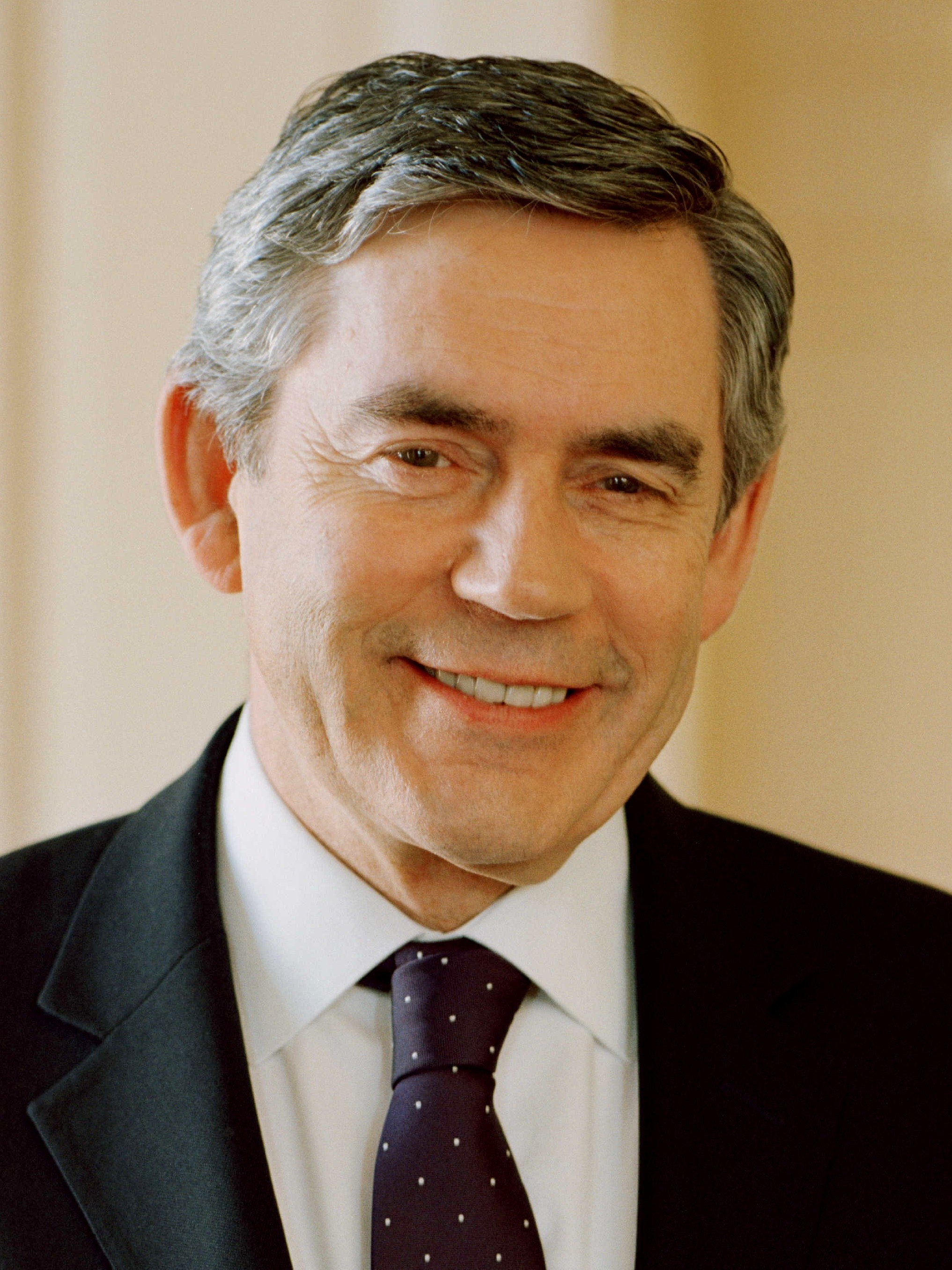

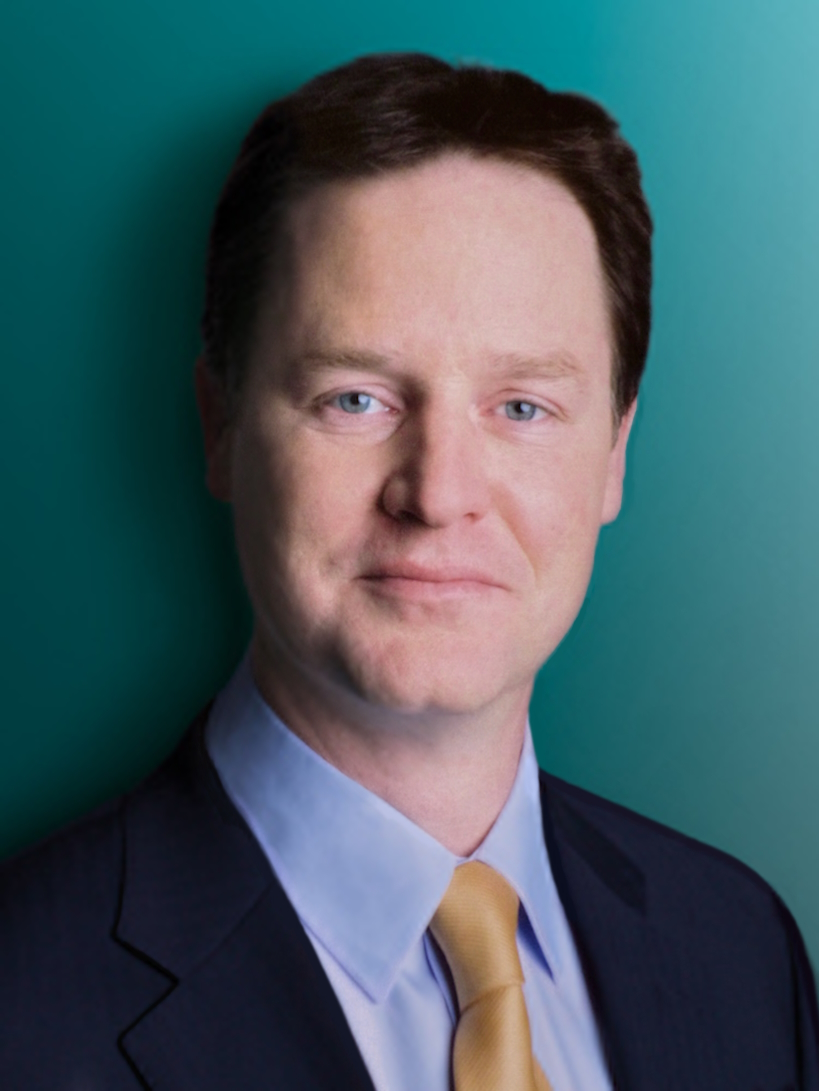

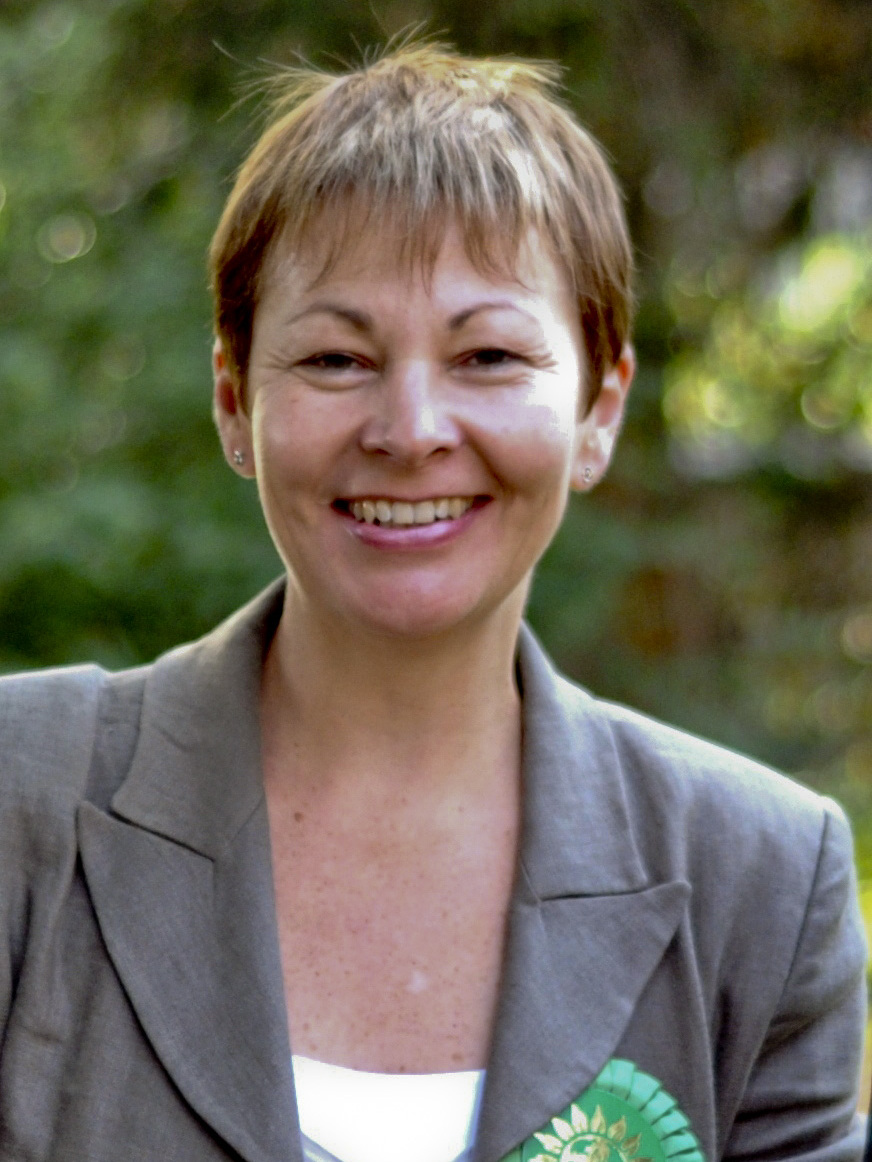
	First party	Second party
Leader	David Cameron	Gordon Brown
Party	Conservative	Labour
Leader since	6 December 2005	24 June 2007
Leader's seat	Witney	Kirkcaldy and Cowdenbeath
Last election	198 seats, 35.7%	285 seats, 35.5%
Seats before	206^{†}	278^{†}
Seats won	297*	191
Seat change	▲91^{†}	▼87^{†}
Popular vote	9,908,019	7,039,387
Percentage	39.5%	28.1%
Swing	▲3.8 pp	▼7.4 pp
	Third party	Fourth party
Leader	Nick Clegg	Caroline Lucas
Party	Liberal Democrats	Green
Leader since	18 December 2007	September 2008
Leader's seat	Sheffield Hallam	Ran in Brighton Pavilion (won)
Last election	47 seats, 22.9%	0 seats, 1.1%
Seats before	47^{†}	0^{†}
Seats won	43	1
Seat change	▼4^{†}	▲1^{†}
Popular vote	6,075,613	258,950
Percentage	24.2%	1.0%
Swing	▲1.3 pp	▼0.1 pp
- A map of English parliamentary constituencies *Seat figure does not include the Speaker of the House of Commons, John Bercow, who was included in the Conservative seat total by some media outlets. †Owing to electoral boundaries changing, this figure is notional.

On Thursday 6 May 2010, the 2010 United Kingdom general election was held in England, to elect all 650 members of the House of Commons, with 533 constituencies being in England.

The Conservative Party achieved a complete majority of English seats, but fared less well in Scotland and Wales, so a coalition government was subsequently formed between the Conservatives and the Liberal Democrats.

== Candidates ==
Below is a table summarising the candidates of the 2010 general election in England, showing parties that stood 10 or more candidates each.

Affiliation	Candidates
Conservative and Unionist Party	532
Labour Party	532
Liberal Democrats	532
UK Independence Party	490
British National Party	306
Green Party of England and Wales	298
English Democrats	107
Christian Party	62
Trade Unionist and Socialist Coalition	25
Official Monster Raving Loony Party	25
Christian Peoples Alliance	17
National Front	16
Socialist Labour Party	14
Respect Party	11
Others	458
Total	3,425

== Results ==
Below is a table summarising the results of the 2010 general election in England, showing all parties above 500 votes.

Party	Seats					Aggregate Votes		
Party	Total	Gains	Losses	Net	Of all (%)	Total	Of all (%)	Change (%)
Conservative	297	95	4	▲91	55.7	9,908,019	39.5	▲3.8
Labour	191	2	89	▼87	35.8	7,039,387	28.1	▼7.4
Liberal Democrats	43	8	12	▼4	8.1	6,075,613	24.2	▲1.3
UKIP	0	0	0	Steady	—	866,564	3.5	▲0.9
BNP	0	0	0	Steady	—	532,323	2.1	▲1.3
Green	1	1	0	▲1	0.2	258,950	1.0	▼0.1
English Democrat	0	0	0	Steady	—	64,826	0.3	▲0.2
Respect	0	0	1	▼1	—	33,251	0.1	▼0.2
Speaker	1	1	0	▲1	0.2	22,860	0.1	Steady
Health Concern	0	0	1	▼1	—	16,150	0.1	Steady
Christian	0	0	0	Steady	—	15,840	0.1	▲0.1
National Front	0	0	0	Steady	—	10,400	0.0	Steady
TUSC	0	New			—	8,042	0.0	New
Monster Raving Loony	0	0	0	Steady	—	7,158	0.0	Steady
Liberal	0	0	0	Steady	—	6,392	0.0	Steady
CPA	0	0	0	Steady	—	6,276	0.0	Steady
Mebyon Kernow	0	0	0	Steady	—	5,379	0.0	Steady
Lincolnshire Independent	0	New			—	5,311	0.0	New
Socialist Labour	0	0	0	Steady	—	4,368	0.0	▼0.1
Mansfield Ind.	0	0	0	Steady	—	4,339	0.0	Steady
Socialist	0	0	0	Steady	—	3,298	0.0	Steady
Trust	0	New			—	2,699	0.0	New
Macclesfield Independents	0	New			—	2,590	0.0	New
Bromsgrove Conservative	0	New			—	2,182	0.0	New
People Before Politics	0	New			—	1,964	0.0	New
SDP	0	Did not stand in 2005			—	1,551	0.0	—N/a
Alliance for Green Socialism	0	0	0	Steady	—	1,454	0.0	Steady
Pirate	0	New			—	1,220	0.0	New
Staffordshire Independent Group	0	New			—	1,208	0.0	New
Common Sense	0	New			—	1,173	0.0	New
Tendring First	0	New			—	1,078	0.0	New
Solihull and Meriden Residents	0	New			—	977	0.0	New
Democratic Labour	0	0	0	Steady	—	842	0.0	Steady
English Independence	0	New			—	803	0.0	New
Democratic Nationalists	0	New			—	753	0.0	New
Save King George Hospital	0	New			—	746	0.0	New
Workers Revolutionary	0	0	0	Steady	—	738	0.0	Steady
Peace	0	0	0	Steady	—	737	0.0	Steady
Independent Voice (Halifax)	0	New			—	722	0.0	New
Animal Protection	0	New			—	675	0.0	New
Middle England	0	New			—	616	0.0	New
Christian Movement	0	New			—	598	0.0	New
Communist	0	0	0	Steady	—	572	0.0	Steady
Islam Zinda Baad	0	New			—	545	0.0	New
Others and Independents	0	—N/a			—	160,079	0.9	—N/a
Total	533			0	100.0	25,081,268	100.0	0.0
Registered voters, and turnout							65.5	▲4.2

Popular vote
Conservative	39.5%
Labour	28.1%
Liberal Democrats	24.2%
UKIP	3.5%
BNP	2.1%
Green	1.0%
Other	1.5%

Parliament seats
Conservative	55.7%
Labour	35.8%
Liberal Democrats	8.1%
Green	0.2%
Speaker	0.2%

== By region ==
Regional vote shares and changes are sourced from the BBC.

=== East Midlands ===
Party	Seats					Aggregate Votes		
Party	Total	Gains	Losses	Net	Of all (%)	Total	Of all (%)	Change (%)
Conservative	31	12	0	▲12	67.4	915,933	41.2	▲4.1
Labour	15	1	12	▼11	32.6	661,813	29.8	▼9.2
Liberal Democrats	0	0	1	▼1	0.0	462,988	20.8	▲2.4
UKIP	0	0	0	Steady	0.0	72,659	3.3	▲0.6
BNP	0	0	0	Steady	0.0	69,706	3.1	▲2.6
Green	0	0	0	Steady	0.0	11,667	0.5	▲0.2
Others	0	0	0	Steady	0.0	29,377	1.3	▼0.5
Total	46			▲2		2,224,143	66.5	▲4.2

=== East of England ===
Party	Seats					Aggregate Votes		
Party	Total	Gains	Losses	Net	Of all (%)	Total	Of all (%)	Change (%)
Conservative	52	10	0	▲10	89.7	1,356,739	47.1	▲3.8
Liberal Democrats	4	1	0	▲1	6.9	692,932	24.1	▲2.2
Labour	2	0	11	▼11	3.4	564,581	19.6	▼10.2
UKIP	0	0	0	Steady	0.0	123,237	4.3	▲1.1
BNP	0	0	0	Steady	0.0	59,505	2.1	▲1.7
Green	0	0	0	Steady	0.0	42,677	1.5	▲0.5
Others	0	0	0	Steady	0.0	39,456	1.4	▲0.8
Total	58			▲2		2,879,117	67.3	▲3.8

=== Greater London ===
Party	Seats					Aggregate Votes		
Party	Total	Gains	Losses	Net	Of all (%)	Total	Of all (%)	Change (%)
Labour	38	1	7	▼6	52.0	1,245,637	36.6	▼2.3
Conservative	28	7	0	▲7	38.4	1,174,568	34.5	▲2.6
Liberal Democrats	7	1	1	Steady	9.6	751,561	22.1	▲0.2
UKIP	0	0	0	Steady	0.0	59,452	1.7	▲0.3
Green	0	0	0	Steady	0.0	54,316	1.6	▲1.1
BNP	0	0	0	Steady	0.0	52,095	1.5	▲0.9
Respect	0	0	1	▼1	0.0	17,368	0.5	▼0.9
Others	0	0	0	Steady	0.0	46,320	1.3	Steady
Total	73			▼1		3,401,317	64.6	▲7.2

Greater London

=== North East England ===
Party	Seats					Aggregate Votes		
Party	Total	Gains	Losses	Net	Of all (%)	Total	Of all (%)	Change (%)
Labour	25	0	2	▼2	86.2	518,261	43.6	▼9.3
Conservative	2	1	0	▲1	6.9	282,347	23.7	▲4.2
Liberal Democrats	2	1	0	▲1	6.9	280,468	23.6	▲0.2
BNP	0	0	0	Steady	0.0	51,940	4.4	▲3.5
UKIP	0	0	0	Steady	0.0	32,196	2.7	▲1.6
Green	0	0	0	Steady	0.0	3,787	0.3	▲0.1
Others	0	0	0	Steady	0.0	20,924	1.8	▼0.3
Total	29			▼1		1,189,923	60.9	▲3.7

=== North West England ===
Party	Seats					Aggregate Votes		
Party	Total	Gains	Losses	Net	Of all (%)	Total	Of all (%)	Change (%)
Labour	47	0	13	▼13	62.7	1,292,978	39.5	▼5.6
Conservative	22	12	0	▲12	29.3	1,038,967	31.7	▲3.0
Liberal Democrats	6	1	0	▲1	8.0	707,770	21.6	▲0.2
UKIP	0	0	0	Steady	0.0	103,782	3.2	▲1.2
BNP	0	0	0	Steady	0.0	70,032	2.1	▲1.1
Green	0	0	0	Steady	0.0	17,046	0.5	▲0.2
Others	0	0	0	Steady	0.0	45,655	1.4	▼0.1
Total	75			▲1		3,276,230	63.6	▲5.5

=== South East England ===
Party	Seats					Aggregate Votes		
Party	Total	Gains	Losses	Net	Of all (%)	Total	Of all (%)	Change (%)
Conservative	75	15	1	▲14	89.3	2,140,895	49.9	▲4.9
Liberal Democrats	4	1	3	▼2	4.8	1,124,786	26.2	▲0.8
Labour	4	0	13	▼13	4.8	697,567	16.2	▼8.1
Green	1	1	0	▲1	1.2	62,124	1.4	▲0.1
UKIP	0	0	0	Steady	0.0	177,269	4.1	▲1.0
BNP	0	0	0	Steady	0.0	30,618	0.7	▲0.6
Others	0	0	0	Steady	0.0	60,981	1.4	▲0.7
Total	84			▲1		4,294,240	68.0	▲3.7

=== South West England ===
Party	Seats					Aggregate Votes		
Party	Total	Gains	Losses	Net	Of all (%)	Total	Of all (%)	Change (%)
Conservative	36	12	1	▲11	65.5	1,187,637	42.8	▲4.2
Liberal Democrats	15	1	4	▼3	27.3	962,954	34.7	▲2.2
Labour	4	0	8	▼8	7.3	426,910	15.4	▼7.4
UKIP	0	0	0	Steady	0.0	123,975	4.5	▲0.7
Green	0	0	0	Steady	0.0	31,517	1.1	▼0.2
BNP	0	0	0	Steady	0.0	20,866	0.8	▲0.7
Others	0	0	0	Steady	0.0	19,584	0.7	▼0.2
Total	55			▲4		2,773,443	69.1	▲2.9

=== West Midlands ===
Party	Seats					Aggregate Votes		
Party	Total	Gains	Losses	Net	Of all (%)	Total	Of all (%)	Change (%)
Conservative	33	16	1	▲15	55.9	1,044,081	39.5	▲4.5
Labour	24	0	14	▼14	40.7	808,114	30.6	▼8.1
Liberal Democrats	2	1	1	Steady	3.4	540,160	20.5	▲1.9
UKIP	0	0	0	Steady	0.0	105,685	4.0	▲0.8
BNP	0	0	0	Steady	0.0	73,394	2.8	▲1.0
Health Concern	0	0	1	▼1	0.0	16,150	0.6	▼0.2
Green	0	0	0	Steady	0.0	14,996	0.6	▼0.1
Others	0	0	0	Steady	0.0	37,885	1.4	Steady
Total	59			Steady		2,640,465	64.6	▲4.2

=== Yorkshire and the Humber ===
Party	Seats					Aggregate Votes		
Party	Total	Gains	Losses	Net	Of all (%)	Total	Of all (%)	Change (%)
Labour	32	0	9	▼9	60.4	821,368	34.7	▼9.3
Conservative	18	10	0	▲10	33.9	769,895	32.5	▲3.9
Liberal Democrats	3	1	2	▼1	5.7	543,684	23.0	▲2.2
BNP	0	0	0	Steady	0.0	104,177	4.4	▲1.6
UKIP	0	0	0	Steady	0.0	65,876	2.8	▲1.4
Green	0	0	0	Steady	0.0	20,824	0.9	▼0.3
Others	0	0	0	Steady	0.0	42,453	1.8	▲0.5
Total	53			▼3		2,368,277	63.2	▲4.5

== See also ==
- 2010 United Kingdom general election in Northern Ireland
- 2010 United Kingdom general election in Scotland
- 2010 United Kingdom general election in Wales
