= 2010 United Kingdom general election in Scotland =

- 6 May 2010

All 59 Scottish seats to the House of Commons
- Turnout: 63.8%, ▲3.2%
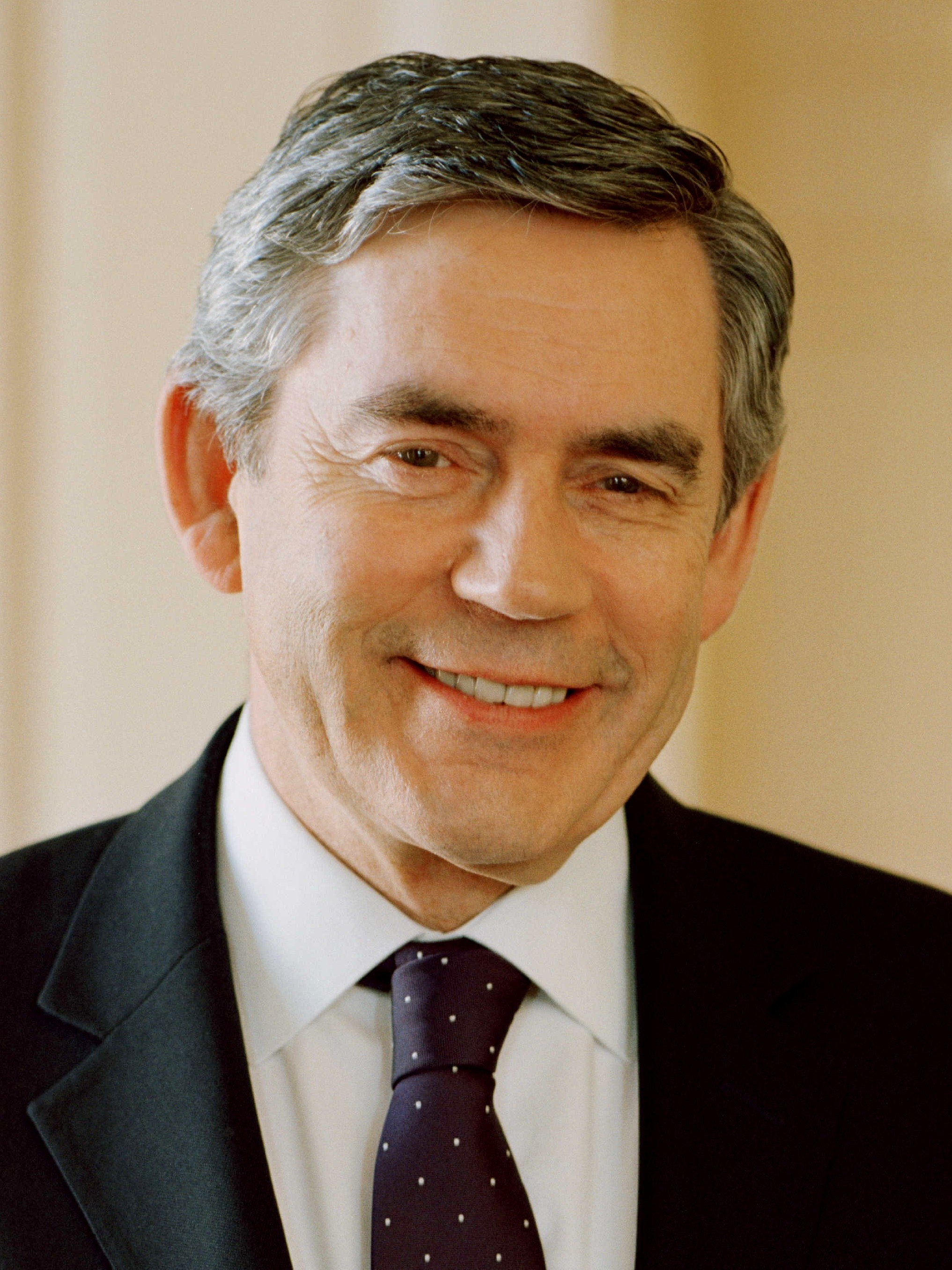

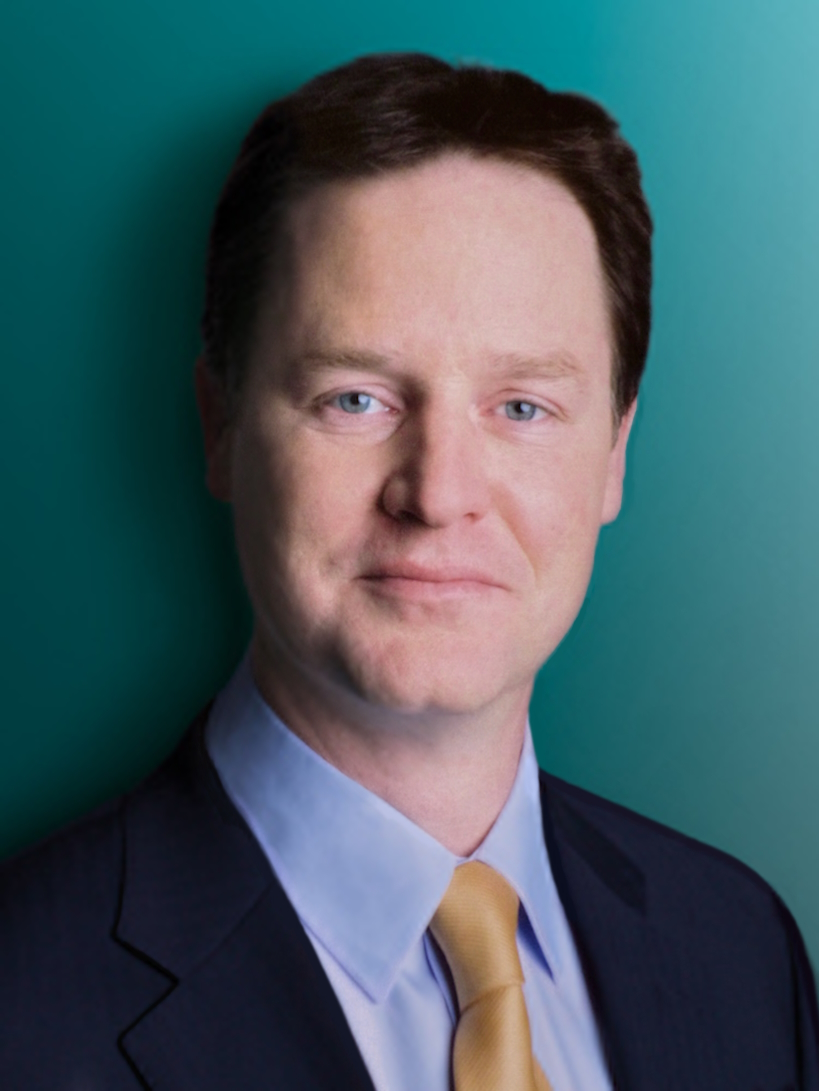

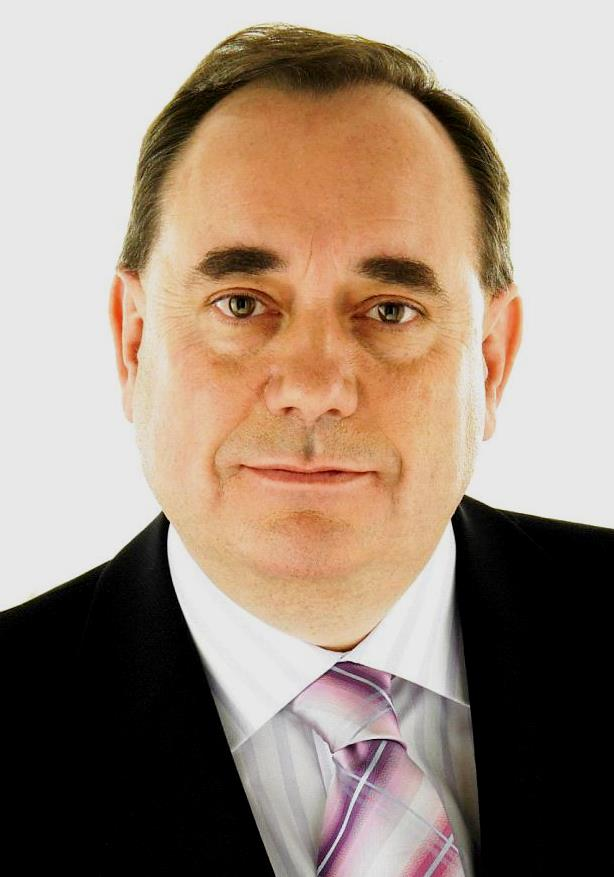

	First party	Second party
Leader	Gordon Brown	Nick Clegg
Party	Labour	Liberal Democrats
Leader since	24 June 2007	18 December 2007
Leader's seat	Kirkcaldy and Cowdenbeath	Sheffield Hallam
Last election	41 seats, 39.5%	11 seats, 22.6%
Seats before	41	11
Seats won	41	11
Seat change	Steady	Steady
Popular vote	1,035,528	465,471
Percentage	42.0%	18.9%
Swing	▲2.5 pp	▼3.7 pp
UK seats	258	57
	Third party	Fourth party
Leader	Alex Salmond	David Cameron
Party	SNP	Conservative
Leader since	3 September 2004	6 December 2005
Leader's seat	Banff and Buchan (stood down)	Witney
Last election	6 seats, 17.7%	1 seat, 15.8%
Seats before	6	1
Seats won	6	1
Seat change	Steady	Steady
Popular vote	491,386	412,855
Percentage	19.9%	16.7%
Swing	▲2.2 pp	▲0.9 pp
UK seats	6	306
- Coloured according to the winning party's vote share in each constituency

A general election was held in the United Kingdom on Thursday, 6 May 2010 and all 59 seats in Scotland were contested. The election result in Scotland was unusual in that there wasn't any change of seats from the previous general election in 2005, although the Labour Party took back two seats that it had lost at by-elections. This was the last general election at which the Labour Party won a majority of seats and plurality of votes in Scotland until 2024.

== Contesting parties ==
Since the 2005 general election, the Scottish National Party had won the 2007 Scottish Parliament election as well as the 2009 European election. They had also won the Glasgow East by-election in 2008, which was previously one of the safest Labour seats in the UK. This boosted the party's confidence and the party's leader Alex Salmond set the ambitious target of 20 seats at the general election. Salmond himself was standing down as an MP because he wanted to focus more on his role as First Minister of Scotland. At the election, the party only increased their share of the vote by 2.3% and had their number of seats reduced to six after losing Glasgow East to Labour.

The Scottish Labour Party had held the majority of seats in Scotland at every general election since 1959, and many prominent government officials were representing Scottish constituencies, such as the Prime Minister Gordon Brown and the Chancellor Alistair Darling. At the election, the Labour Party in Scotland increased its share of the vote by 2.5% and regained the Glasgow East and Dunfermline and West Fife constituencies after having lost them at by-elections over the course of the preceding term, giving them 41 out of 59 seats in Scotland.

The Scottish Conservative Party had not held the majority of Scottish seats in a general election since 1955 and it lost all eleven of its seats in the election of 1997. Since 2001, the party had only held one Westminster seat in Scotland. In 2005, following the re-organisation of Scottish constituencies, that seat was Dumfriesshire, Clydesdale and Tweeddale, a mostly rural constituency near the Scottish Borders. However, the party had 11 target seats within Scotland for the election and officials such as former party leader William Hague had predicted a 'Tory breakthrough' for Scotland. Following the election, the Conservative vote in Scotland increased by roughly 1% but with only the solitary seat being retained.

At the 2005 general election, the Scottish Liberal Democrats gained 11 Scottish seats in Westminster and saw this tally increased to 12 following the Dunfermline and West Fife by-election in 2006. Two former Liberal Democrat leaders, Charles Kennedy and Sir Menzies Campbell represented Scottish constituencies. At the election, the Liberal Democrat vote share fell in Scotland and no gains were made. The party was once again left with 11 seats.

Minor parties such as the UK Independence Party, the British National Party and the Scottish Green Party all contested more Scottish seats than they did in the 2005 election. The Socialist Workers Party and Solidarity (a splinter group of the Scottish Socialists) took part in the Trade Unionist and Socialist Coalition for the election. The Scottish Socialist Party had contested all of the Scottish constituencies in 2005 but because of party splits, it fielded only 10 candidates for the 2010 election.

== Campaign events ==
- 9 April – The Labour Party candidate for Moray, Stuart Maclennan, was sacked after making offensive comments on his Twitter page. These included insulting politicians such as David Cameron, Nick Clegg, John Bercow and Diane Abbott and also referring to the elderly as 'coffin dodgers' and voters in the North of Scotland as teuchters.
- 12 April – Prime Minister Gordon Brown asks the Queen to dissolve parliament, thus triggering the election.
- 20 April – The first of three televised Scottish Leader's debates takes place.
- 27 April – The Conservative candidate for North Ayrshire and Arran, Philip Lardner was expelled from his party and relieved from his job as a primary school teacher after making comments on his blog that homosexuality was 'not normal'. This occurred on 27 April 2010, which was too late to remove his name from the ballot paper and subsequently he still read as the Conservative & Unionist candidate.
- 28 April – The SNP failed to sue the BBC for excluding them from the televised leader's debates, claiming that the BBC had breached its rules on impartiality by excluding the SNP.
- 6 May – Polling day across the United Kingdom of Great Britain and Northern Ireland. The following day, a hung parliament is declared, where no party holds an overall majority in the House of Commons.

== Scottish Leaders' debates ==
In correspondence with the main leaders' debates, featuring David Cameron, Gordon Brown and Nick Clegg, three televised debates were broadcast, with representatives from the four main parties in Scotland. The first debate was broadcast on STV on 20 April, the second on Sky News on 25 April and the third on BBC One Scotland on 2 May.

The representatives from each of the main parties were:

- Scottish Labour Party – Jim Murphy, Secretary of State for Scotland, MP for East Renfrewshire
- Scottish Conservative Party – David Mundell, Shadow Secretary of State for Scotland, MP for Dumfriesshire, Clydesdale and Tweeddale
- Scottish Liberal Democrats – Alistair Carmichael, Liberal Democrat Spokesman on Northern Ireland and Scotland, MP for Orkney and Shetland
- Scottish National Party – Angus Robertson, SNP leader at Westminster, MP for Moray

== Target seats ==
=== Labour Party ===
Rank	Constituency	Winning party 2005	Swing Required	Labour's place 2005	Result
1	Dundee East	SNP	0.49%	2nd	SNP hold
2	Dumfriesshire, Clydesdale and Tweeddale	Conservative	1.95%	2nd	CON hold
3	East Dunbartonshire	Liberal Democrats	4.35%	2nd	LD hold
4	Inverness, Nairn, Badenoch and Strathspey	Liberal Democrats	4.69%	2nd	LD hold

=== Scottish National Party ===
Rank	Constituency	Winning party 2005	Swing Required	SNP's place 2005	Result
1	Ochil and South Perthshire	Labour	0.74%	2nd	LAB hold
2	Dundee West	Labour	7.28%	2nd	LAB hold
3	Kilmarnock and Loudoun	Labour	9.81%	2nd	LAB hold
4	Aberdeen North	Labour	9.28%	3rd	LAB hold

=== Liberal Democrats ===
Rank	Constituency	Winning party 2005	Swing Required	Liberal Democrat's place 2005	Result
1	Edinburgh South	Labour	0.48%	2nd	LAB hold
2	Aberdeen South	Labour	1.62%	2nd	LAB hold
3	Edinburgh North and Leith	Labour	2.53%	2nd	LAB hold

=== Conservative Party ===
Rank	Constituency	Winning party 2005	Swing Required	Conservative's place 2005	Result
1	Perth and North Perthshire	SNP	1.66%	2nd	SNP hold
2	Angus	SNP	2.1%	2nd	SNP hold
3	Dumfries and Galloway	Labour	2.87%	2nd	LAB hold
4	Stirling	Labour	5.46%	2nd	LAB hold

== Overall results ==
Party	Seats					Aggregate votes		
Party	Total	Gains	Losses	Net	Of all (%)	Total	Of all (%)	Difference
Labour	41	0	0	Steady	69.5	1,035,528	42.0	▲2.5
Liberal Democrats	11	0	0	Steady	18.6	465,471	18.9	▼3.7
SNP	6	0	0	Steady	10.2	491,386	19.9	▲2.2
Conservative	1	0	0	Steady	1.7	412,855	16.7	▲0.9
UKIP	0	0	0	Steady	—	17,223	0.7	▲0.3
Green	0	0	0	Steady	—	16,827	0.7	▼0.3
BNP	0	0	0	Steady	—	8,910	0.4	▲0.3
TUSC	0	New			—	3,530	0.1	New
Scottish Socialist	0	0	0	Steady	—	3,157	0.1	▼1.7
Socialist Labour	0	0	0	Steady	—	1,673	0.0	Steady
Christian	0	0	0	Steady	—	835	0.0	▼0.2
Trust	0	New			—	534	0.0	New
Liberal	0	0	0	Steady	—	389	0.0	Steady
Scottish Jacobite	0	New			—	290	0.0	New
Communist	0	0	0	Steady	—	237	0.0	Steady
Others	0	0	0	Steady	—	6,877	0.3	Steady
Total	59					2,465,722	63.8	▲3.2

2010 map of Scottish Constituencies - Results

=== Votes and seats summary ===
Popular vote
Labour	42.00%
SNP	19.93%
Liberal Democrats	18.88%
Conservative	16.74%
UKIP	0.70%
Greens	0.68%
Other	1.07%

Parliament seats
Labour	69.49%
Liberal Democrats	18.64%
SNP	10.17%
Conservative	1.69%

== Results by constituency ==
Winning party in each constituency is marked in bold.

Constituency	Labour	%	Lib Dems	%	SNP	%	Conservative	%	Others	%	Notes
Aberdeen North	**16,746**	**44.4%**	7,001	18.6%	8,385	22.2%	4,666	12.4%	903	2.4%	SNP target #4
Aberdeen South	**15,722**	**36.5%**	12,216	28.4%	5,102	11.9%	8,914	20.7%	1,080	2.5%	Lib Dem target #1
Airdrie and Shotts	**20,849**	**58.2%**	2,898	8.1%	8,441	23.5%	3,133	8.7%	528	1.5%	
Angus	6,535	17.2%	4,090	10.8%	**15,020**	**39.6%**	11,738	30.9%	577	1.5%	Conservative target #2
Argyll and Bute	10,274	22.7%	**14,292**	**31.6%**	8,563	18.9%	10,861	24.0%	945	2.0%	
Ayr, Carrick and Cumnock	**21,632**	**47.1%**	4,264	9.3%	8,276	18.0%	11,721	25.5%	N/A		
Banff and Buchan	5,382	14.0%	4,365	11.3%	**15,868**	**43.3%**	11,841	30.8%	1,010	2.6%	Largest swing recorded in Scotland (10.6 SNP to CON)
Berwickshire, Roxburgh and Selkirk	5,003	10.2%	**22,230**	**45.4%**	4,497	9.2%	16,555	33.8%	729	1.5%	Michael Moore's Seat
Caithness, Sutherland and Easter Ross	7,081	24.6%	**11,907**	**41.4%**	5,516	19.2%	3,744	13.0%	520	1.8%	
Central Ayrshire	**20,950**	**47.7%**	5,236	11.9%	8,364	19.0%	8,943	20.4%	422	1.0%	
Coatbridge, Chryston and Bellshill	**27,728**	**66.6%**	3,519	8.5%	7,014	16.9%	3,374	8.1%	N/A		
Cumbernauld, Kilsyth and Kirkintilloch East	**23,549**	**57.2%**	3,924	9.5%	9,794	23.8%	3,407	8.3%	476	1.2%	
Dumfries and Galloway	**23,950**	**45.9%**	4,608	8.8%	6,419	12.3%	16,501	31.6%	695	1.3%	Conservative target #3
Dumfriesshire, Clydesdale and Tweeddale	13,263	28.9%	9,080	19.8%	4,945	10.8%	**17,457**	**38.0%**	1,147	2.5%	Conservative's only Scottish seat, Labour target #2
Dundee East	13,529	33.3%	4,285	10.6%	**15,350**	**37.8%**	6,177	15.2%	796	1.9%	Labour target #1
Dundee West	**17,994**	**48.5%**	4,233	11.4%	10,716	28.9%	3,461	9.3%	722	2.0%	SNP target #2
Dunfermline and West Fife	**22,639**	**46.3%**	17,169	35.1%	5,201	10.6%	3,305	6.8%	633	1.3%	Regained by Labour after by-election loss to Lib Dems
East Dunbartonshire	16,367	34.1%	**18,551**	**38.7%**	5,054	10.5%	7,431	15.5%	545	1.1%	Labour target #3
East Kilbride, Strathaven and Lesmahagow	**26,241**	**51.1%**	5,052	9.9%	11,738	23.0%	6,613	13.0%	1,302	2.6%	
East Lothian	**21,919**	**44.6%**	8,228	16.9%	7,883	16.0%	9,661	19.7%	1,410	2.9%	
East Renfrewshire	**25,987**	**50.8%**	4,720	9.2%	4,535	8.9%	15,567	30.4%	372	0.7%	Jim Murphy's seat
Edinburgh East	**17,314**	**43.4%**	7,751	19.4%	8,133	20.4%	4,358	10.9%	2,309	5.8%	
Edinburgh North and Leith	**17,740**	**37.5%**	16,016	33.8%	4,568	9.6%	7,079	14.9%	1,825	3.8%	Lib Dem target #2
Edinburgh South	**15,215**	**34.7%**	14,899	34.0%	3,354	7.7%	9,452	21.6%	880	2.0%	
Edinburgh South West	**19,473**	**42.8%**	8,194	18.0%	5,530	12.2%	11,026	24.3%	1,239	2.7%	Alistair Darling's seat
Edinburgh West	12,881	27.7%	**16,684**	**35.9%**	6,115	13.2%	10,767	23.2%	N/A		
Falkirk	**23,207**	**45.7%**	5,225	10.3%	15,364	30.3%	5,698	11.2%	1,283	2.5%	
Glasgow Central	**15,908**	**52.0%**	5,010	16.4%	5,357	17.5%	2,158	7.1%	2,139	7.0%	
Glasgow East	**19,797**	**61.6%**	1,617	5.0%	7,957	24.7%	1,453	4.5%	1,340	4.1%	Regained by Labour after by-election loss to SNP
Glasgow North	**13,181**	**44.5%**	9,283	31.3%	3,530	11.9%	2,039	7.1%	1,530	5.2%	
Glasgow North East	**20,100**	**68.3%**	2,262	7.7%	4,158	14.1%	1,569	5.3%	1,320	4.4%	
Glasgow North West	**19,233**	**54.1%**	5,622	15.8%	5,430	15.3%	3,537	9.9%	1,760	5.0%	
Glasgow South	**20,736**	**51.7%**	4,739	11.8%	8,078	20.1%	4,592	11.5%	1,949	4.9%	
Glasgow South West	**19,863**	**62.5%**	2,870	9.0%	5,192	16.3%	2,084	6.6%	1,772	4.9%	
Glenrothes	**25,247**	**62.3%**	3,108	7.7%	8,799	21.7%	2,922	7.2%	425	1.0%	
Gordon	9,811	20.1%	**17,575**	**36.0%**	10,827	22.2%	9,111	18.7%	1,451	2.9%	
Inverclyde	**20,933**	**56.0%**	5,007	13.3%	6,577	17.5%	4,502	12.0%	433	1.2%	
Inverness, Nairn, Badenoch and Strathspey	10,407	22.1%	**19,172**	**40.7%**	8,803	18.7%	6,278	13.3%	2,426	5.2%	Danny Alexander's seat, Labour target #4
Kilmarnock and Loudoun	**24,460**	**52.5%**	3,419	7.3%	12,082	26.0%	6,592	14.2%	N/A		SNP target #3
Kirkcaldy and Cowdenbeath	**29,559**	**64.5%**	4,269	9.3%	6,550	14.3%	4,258	9.3%	1,166	2.6%	Gordon Brown's seat, largest majority of any Scottish seat
Lanark and Hamilton East	**23,258**	**50.0%**	5,249	11.3%	9,780	21.0%	6,981	15.0%	1,286	2.7%	
Linlithgow and East Falkirk	**25,634**	**49.8%**	6,589	12.8%	13,081	25.4%	6,146	11.9%	N/A		
Livingston	**23,215**	**48.5%**	5,316	11.1%	12,424	25.9%	5,158	10.8%	1,794	3.7%	
Midlothian	**18,449**	**47.0%**	6,711	17.1%	8,100	20.6%	4,661	11.9%	1,321	3.3%	
Moray	7,007	17.1%	5,965	14.5%	**16,273**	**39.7%**	10,683	26.1%	1,085	2.6%	
Motherwell and Wishaw	**23,910**	**61.1%**	3,840	9.8%	7,104	18.2%	3,660	9.4%	609	1.6%	
Na h-Eileanan an Iar	4,838	32.9%	1,097	7.5%	**6,723**	**45.7%**	647	4.4%	1,412	9.6%	
North Ayrshire and Arran	**21,860**	**47.4%**	4,630	10.0%	11,965	25.9%	7,212	15.6%	449	1.0%	
North East Fife	6,869	17.1%	**17,763**	**44.3%**	5,685	14.2%	8,715	21.8%	1,032	2.6%	Menzies Campbell's seat
Ochil and South Perthshire	**19,131**	**37.9%**	5,754	11.4%	13,944	27.6%	10,342	20.5%	1,298	2.6%	SNP target #1
Orkney and Shetland	2,061	10.7%	**11,989**	**62.0%**	2,042	10.6%	2,032	10.5%	1,222	6.3%	Safest Lib Dem seat in the UK
Paisley and Renfrewshire North	**23,613**	**54.0%**	4,597	10.5%	8,333	19.1%	6,381	14.6%	783	1.8%	
Paisley and Renfrewshire South	**23,842**	**59.6%**	3,812	9.5%	7,228	18.1%	3,979	9.9%	1,137	2.8%	Douglas Alexander's seat
Perth and North Perthshire	7,923	16.4%	5,954	12.3%	**19,118**	**39.6%**	14,739	30.5%	534	1.1%	Conservative target #1
Ross, Skye and Lochaber	5,265	15.1%	**18,335**	**52.6%**	5,263	15.1%	4,260	12.2%	1,715	4.9%	Charles Kennedy's seat
Rutherglen and Hamilton West	**28,566**	**60.8%**	5,636	12.0%	7,564	16.1%	4,540	9.7%	675	1.4%	
Stirling	**19,558**	**41.8%**	6,797	14.5%	8,091	17.3%	11,204	23.9%	1,141	2.4%	Conservative target #4
West Aberdeenshire and Kincardine	6,159	13.6%	**17,362**	**38.4%**	7,086	15.7%	13,678	30.3%	910	2.0%	
West Dunbartonshire	**25,905**	**61.3%**	3,434	8.1%	8,497	20.1%	3,242	7.7%	1,188	2.8%	

== Superlatives ==
=== Labour Party ===
- Highest share of vote – Glasgow North East, 68.3% of vote
- Lowest share of vote – Berwickshire, Roxburgh and Selkirk, 10.2% of vote

=== Scottish National Party ===
- Highest share of vote – Na h-Eileanan an Iar, 45.7% of vote
- Lowest share of vote – Edinburgh South, 7.7% of vote

=== Liberal Democrats ===
- Highest share of vote – Orkney and Shetland, 62.0% of vote
- Lowest share of vote – Glasgow East, 5.0% of vote

=== Conservative Party ===
- Highest share of vote – Dumfriesshire, Clydesdale and Tweeddale, 38.0% of vote
- Lowest share of vote – Na h-Eileanan an Iar, 4.4% of vote

=== Minor parties' highest shares ===
- UK Independence Party – Orkney and Shetland, 6.3% of vote
- Scottish Green Party – Edinburgh East, 5.1% of vote
- British National Party – Banff and Buchan, 2.6% of vote

== See also ==
- 2010 United Kingdom general election in England
- 2010 United Kingdom general election in Northern Ireland
- 2010 United Kingdom general election in Wales
