= 2007 Liberal Democrats leadership election =

UK political party leadership election

- 17 October – 18 December 2007
- Turnout: 64.1% (▼8.1%)
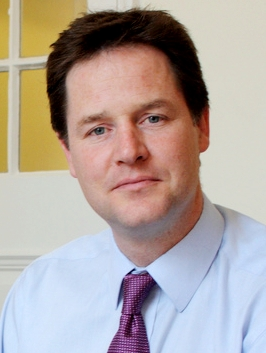

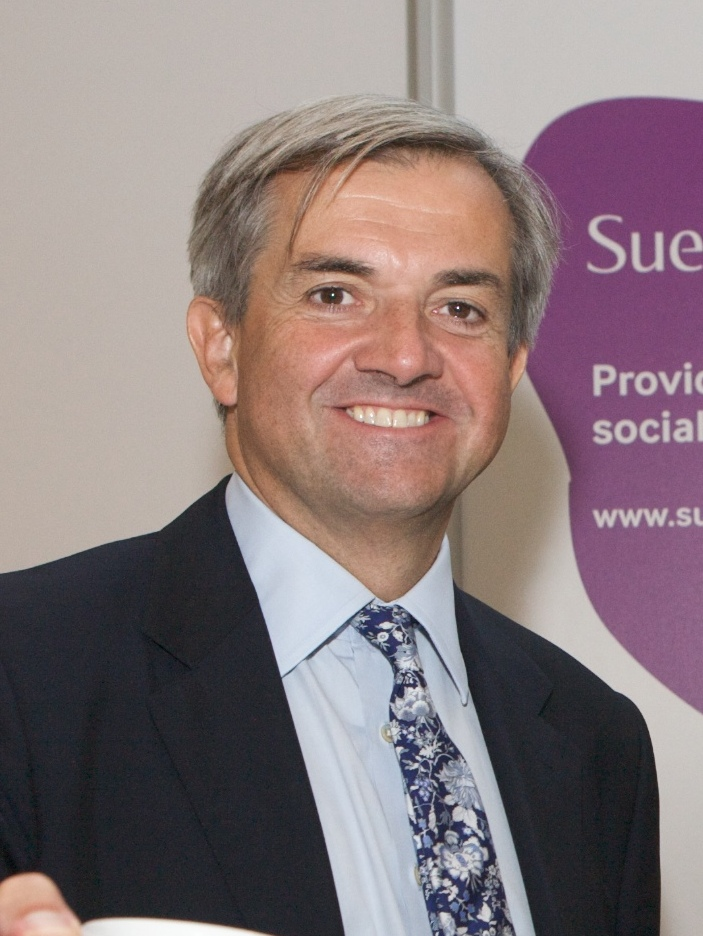
Candidate	Nick Clegg	Chris Huhne
Popular vote	20,988	20,477
Percentage	50.6%	49.4%
Leader before election
Vince Cable (interim)
Menzies Campbell
Elected Leader
Nick Clegg

The 2007 Liberal Democrats leadership election was held following the resignation of Sir Menzies Campbell as leader on 15 October 2007, after 19 months as leader of the Liberal Democrats, the third-largest political party in the United Kingdom. Vince Cable, the deputy leader of the parliamentary party, was acting leader until the conclusion of the leadership election. The result was announced on 18 December 2007 with Nick Clegg winning by a narrow margin of 1.2%.

== Background ==
The resignation of Menzies Campbell came after a period of speculation about his future as party leader. This was seen as due to media-inspired concerns over his age and poor poll ratings for the party. This speculation mounted after Prime Minister Gordon Brown announced he would not be calling a General Election in 2007. The resignation was announced by the party president Simon Hughes and the deputy leader of the parliamentary party Vince Cable.

== Election rules ==
The timetable for the election was announced on 16 October 2007 with the new leader to be announced on 18 December. Liberal Democrat leadership elections use the Alternative Vote system, the single-winner version of the Single Transferable Vote, although, since only two candidates contested this election the contest effectively became a simple plurality vote.

Nominations for candidates opened on 16 October 2007 and closed at 16:00 (UTC+0) on 31 October: each candidate needed the support of at least 10% of Liberal Democrat MPs (i.e. 7 MPs) and at least 200 party members from at least 20 different local parties. MPs could only nominate one candidate, unlike the previous election.

A series of online and offline hustings meetings were held around the country, and were listed on the party's official news page for the contest.

Balloting of members commenced on 21 November with the distribution of ballots to party members, the deadline for their return being 15 December and the victor to be announced at around 2:30 p.m. on 18 December 2007.

== Campaign ==
=== Opening ===
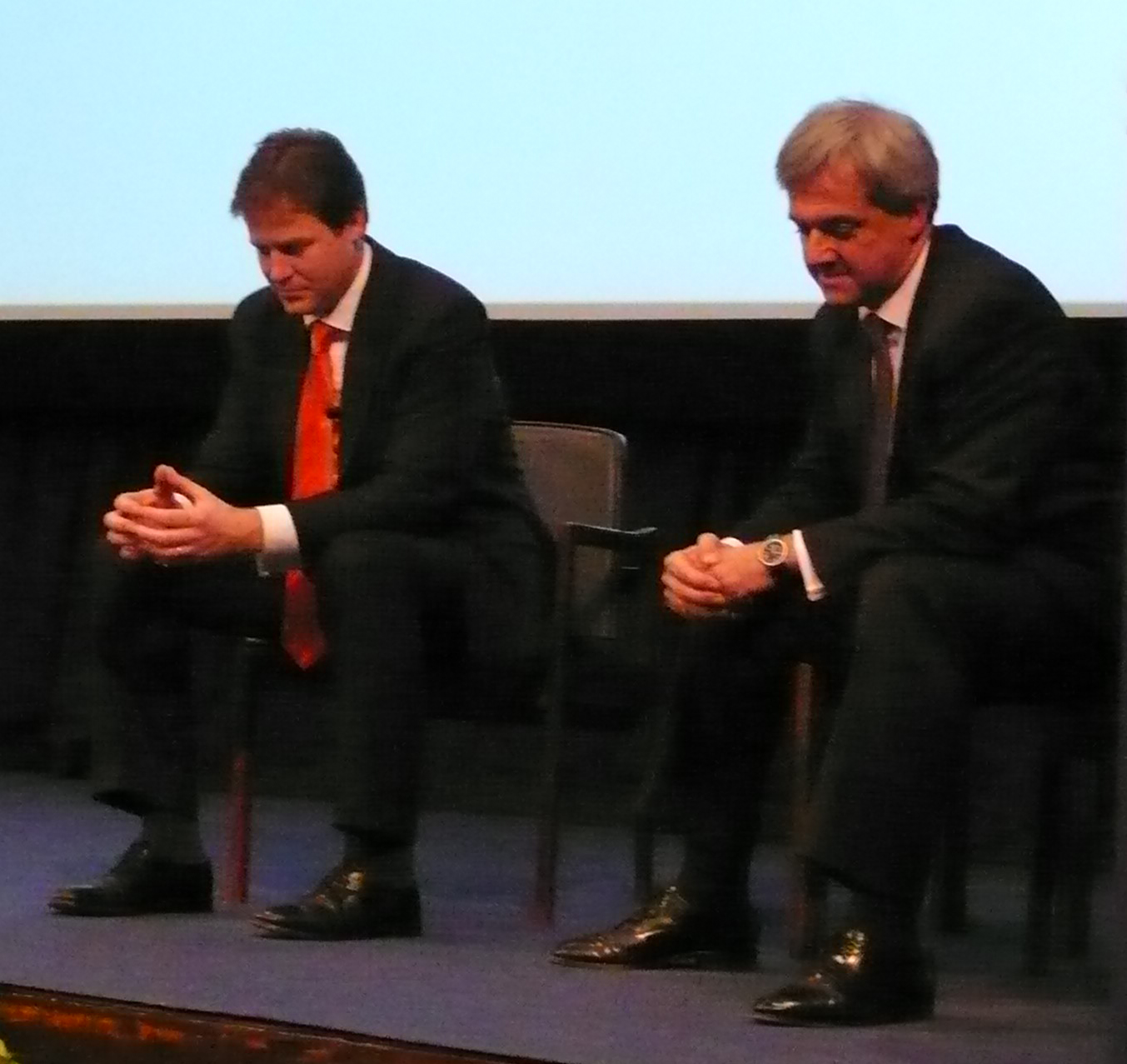
Nick Clegg and Chris Huhne

In media reports and the betting markets, the front-runners were friends Nick Clegg (Home Affairs spokesperson) and Chris Huhne (Environment spokesperson). Huhne ran in the 2006 leadership election, coming second to Campbell, whom Clegg had supported.

Following Campbell's surprise resignation, there was speculation as to who would run. Various contenders ruled themselves out early on (including notably Vince Cable, Ed Davey, Lynne Featherstone, Julia Goldsworthy, Simon Hughes, Susan Kramer, David Laws, Sarah Teather and Steve Webb), leading to the possibility of only two candidates achieving sufficient nominations. Huhne launched his campaign first on Wednesday 17 October, with Clegg launching his on Friday 19 October.

John Hemming announced on his blog that he wished to stand, and that he was taking soundings from colleagues, but he went on to acknowledge that it would be too difficult for him to obtain sufficient MP nominators. Former leader Charles Kennedy initially said he was "highly unlikely" to run again, and that it is not part of his "game plan", but did not completely rule out the possibility. He later more clearly rejected the idea.

Huhne and then Clegg submitted their formal nomination paperwork. Clegg attracted most support from fellow MPs, although both candidates had high-profile supporters, including former Liberal Democrat leader Paddy Ashdown for Clegg and former Liberal leader David Steel for Huhne.

Nominations closed at 16:00 (UTC+0) on 31 October 2007.

=== Policy differences ===
Nick Clegg took a more multilateralist line than Chris Huhne, who was opposed to the Trident ballistic missile system. Nick Clegg favoured retaining half of Trident's arsenal to use as a bargaining chip in 2010 negotiations; Chris Huhne saw saving money on the nuclear deterrent as being a viable means of raising money to fund greater spending on army equipment and conventional weaponry with the possibility of a smaller deterrent system.

Chris Huhne emphasised his opposition to voucher systems in the provision of public services. Nick Clegg denied supporting voucher systems, and has gone on record as ruling such systems out.

Nick Clegg stated that he saw the Liberal Democrats' role in a hung parliament scenario as being to support whichever party is most likely to be able to form a government; however, he said that the other two main party leaders and their parties were both conservative and that he was neither an heir to Blair nor a Cameron clone. Clegg also stated that he saw liberalism as being more important than ever, and accused Chris Huhne of entering "an unholy alliance" with the SNP and Conservatives over the environment and his supporting the principle of elements of the Conservative Party's plans to have English only voting for English only matters.

On most issues the two candidates shared common positions on the environment, identity cards, counter-terrorism and the war in Iraq.

=== Hustings ===
Both candidates appeared at several hustings organised by the party. There were also joint appearances on the BBC's TV shows Question Time, Newsnight and The Politics Show, the latter of which saw a spat between the candidates after Huhne's campaign team had delivered a press briefing document to the show mistitled "Calamity Clegg", leading to a formal complaint from the Clegg team.

Huhne was generally acknowledged to have "edged" the televised debate - the candidates clashed on issues including Trident and presentation - and a straw poll following the Cambridge hustings placed Huhne as much as 2-1 ahead. However, given the unreliability of such polls, and Clegg's continued position as the bookies' favourite, the consensus in the party and media was that the two were running neck and neck. Some columnists have been critical of Clegg's debate performances.

A YouGov poll of party members gave Clegg a 56% to 44% lead in late November, although about half of respondents had yet to vote. On 3 December 2007, on the basis of another poll, Clegg claimed to be well ahead with 60% of votes cast so far in his favour.

=== Voting issues ===
About 1,300 postal votes were caught up in the Christmas post and missed the election deadline. An unofficial check of the late papers showed Huhne had enough votes among them to hand him victory. Huhne stood by the result, saying "Nick Clegg won fair and square on the rules counting the ballot papers that arrived in by the deadline. There is no question of any re-run."

== Candidates ==
At the close of nominations, the following had been successfully nominated.

=== Nick Clegg ===
Supporters included:

- MPs: Danny Alexander, Norman Baker, John Barrett, Alan Beith, Colin Breed, Jeremy Browne, Malcolm Bruce, Alistair Carmichael, Ed Davey, Tim Farron, Don Foster, Julia Goldsworthy, Mike Hancock, Nick Harvey, David Heath, John Hemming, Simon Hughes, Mark Hunter, Paul Keetch, Norman Lamb, David Laws, Michael Moore, Greg Mulholland, Mark Oaten, Lembit Öpik, John Pugh, Alan Reid, Willie Rennie, Dan Rogerson, Paul Rowen, Sir Robert Smith, Jo Swinson, Sarah Teather, John Thurso, Steve Webb, Stephen Williams, Phil Willis, Richard Younger-Ross
- Lords: Lord Addington, former Lib Dem leader Lord Ashdown of Norton-sub-Hamdon, Baroness Barker, Baroness Bonham-Carter of Yarnbury, Lord Bradshaw, Lord Clement-Jones, Baroness Falkner of Margravine, Lord Fearn, Earl of Glasgow DL, Lord Holme of Cheltenham, Lord Jones of Cheltenham, Lord Lester of Herne Hill, Baroness Linklater of Butterstone, Baroness Ludford (also an MEP), Baroness Nicholson of Winterbourne (also an MEP), Lord Phillips, Lord Razzall, Lord Roberts of Llandudno, Lord Russell-Johnston, Baroness Scott of Needham Market, Lord Smith of Clifton, Lord Thomas of Gresford, Baroness Tonge, Lord Tyler, Lord Wallace of Tankerness, Baroness Walmsley, Baroness Williams of Crosby
- MEPs: Chris Davies, Sarah Ludford (see above), Bill Newton Dunn, Emma Nicholson (see above), Diana Wallis, Graham Watson
- MSPs: Liam McArthur, Tavish Scott, Jim Tolson
- AMs: Peter Black, Michael German, Kirsty Williams
- Other notable supporters: former MP Richard Allan, former MP Sir Cyril Smith, François Bayrou (President of the French political party Mouvement Démocrate)
- Newspapers/Magazines: The Independent, The Guardian

=== Chris Huhne ===
Supporters included:

- MPs: Lynne Featherstone (campaign chairwoman) — Tom Brake, Annette Brooke, Sandra Gidley, Evan Harris, Paul Holmes, Martin Horwood, David Howarth, Susan Kramer, John Leech, Matthew Taylor, Mark Williams, Roger Williams
- Lords: Lord Dholakia, Lord Ezra, Viscount Falkland, Lord Greaves, Baroness Harris of Richmond, Lord Livsey of Talgarth, former Social Democratic Party leader Lord Maclennan of Rogart, Baroness Miller of Chilthorne Domer, Lord Newby, Baroness Northover, Lord Oakeshott of Seagrove Bay, Lord Redesdale, Lord Rodgers of Quarry Bank, Lord Sharman, former Liberal Party leader Lord Steel of Aikwood, Baroness Thomas of Walliswood, Lord Thomson of Monifieth
- MEPs: Elspeth Attwooll, Sharon Bowles, Andrew Duff, Liz Lynne
- MSPs: Robert Brown, Ross Finnie, Jim Hume, John Farquhar Munro, Alison McInnes, Hugh O'Donnell, Mike Pringle, Jeremy Purvis, Mike Rumbles, Margaret Smith, Jamie Stone
- AMs: Mick Bates, Eleanor Burnham, Jenny Randerson
- Other notable supporters: parliamentary candidate Sal Brinton, Anna Werrin (campaign manager; former Head of the Leader's Office to Charles Kennedy), Candy Piercy (on the party's Federal Executive, President of the Liberal Democrats Agents Association), Duncan Brack (Chair of the Federal Conference Committee), Polly Toynbee (newspaper columnist)
- Newspapers/Magazines: New Statesman

== Result ==
Candidate	Votes	%
Nick Clegg ✓	20,988	50.6
Chris Huhne	20,477	49.4
Turnout	41,465	64.1
Sources: result, turnout

The turnout at this leadership election was over 10,000 fewer than in the 2006 election. A total of 64,727 ballot papers were issued, compared with 72,064 for the 2006 contest.
