= 2015 United Kingdom general election in England =

- 7 May 2015

All 533 English seats to the House of Commons 267 seats needed for English majority
- Turnout: 66.0% (▲0.5 pp)

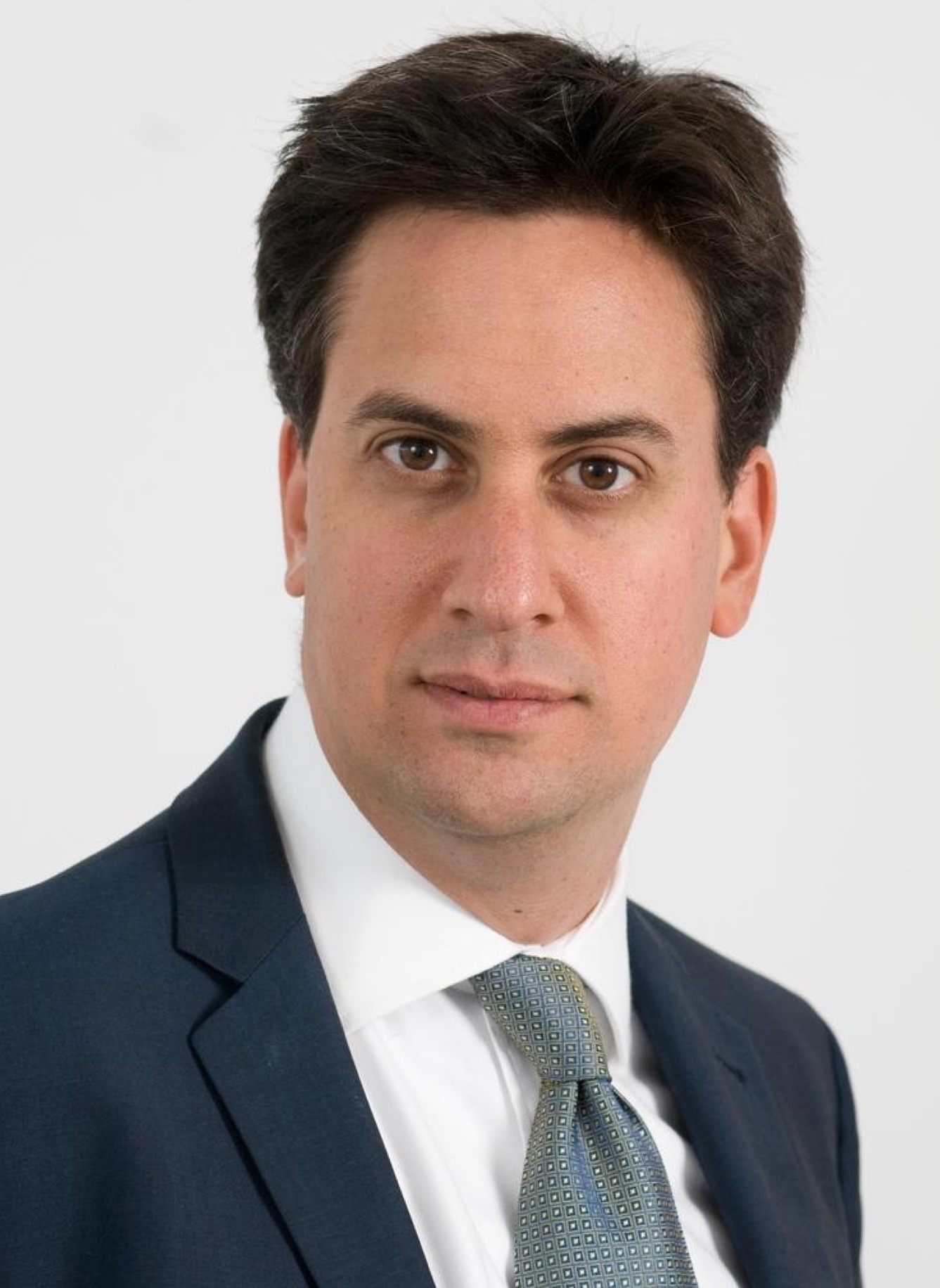

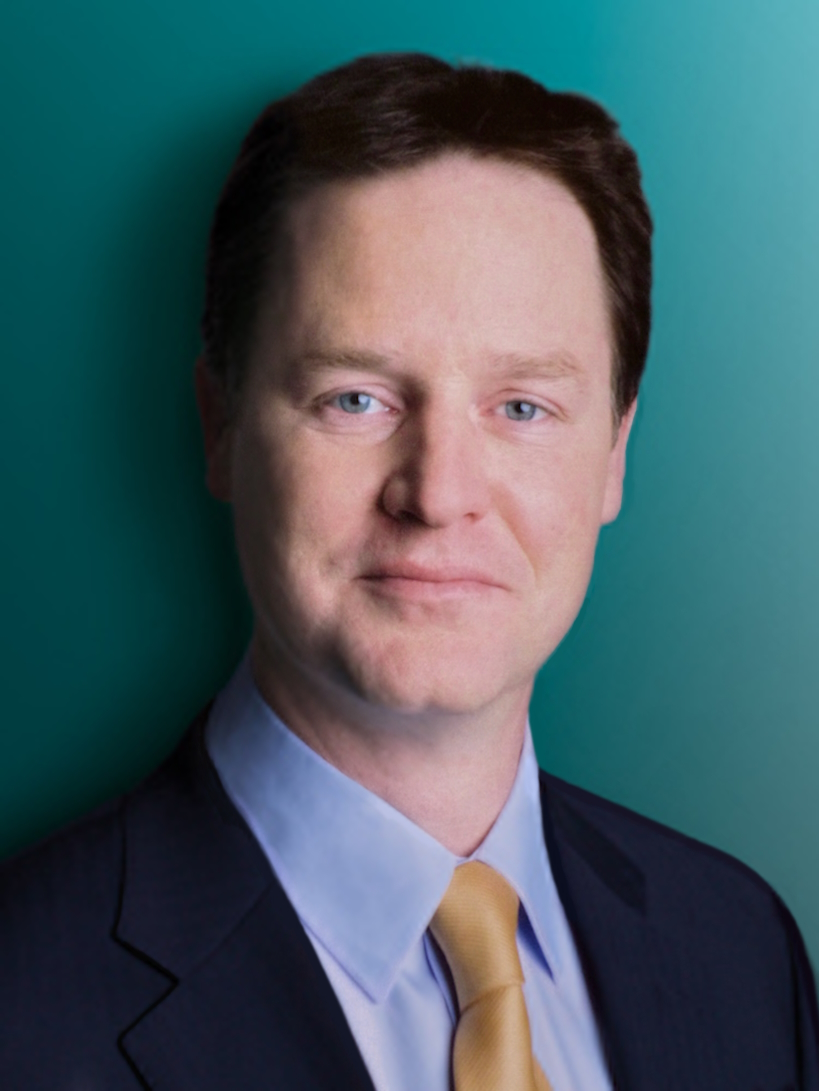

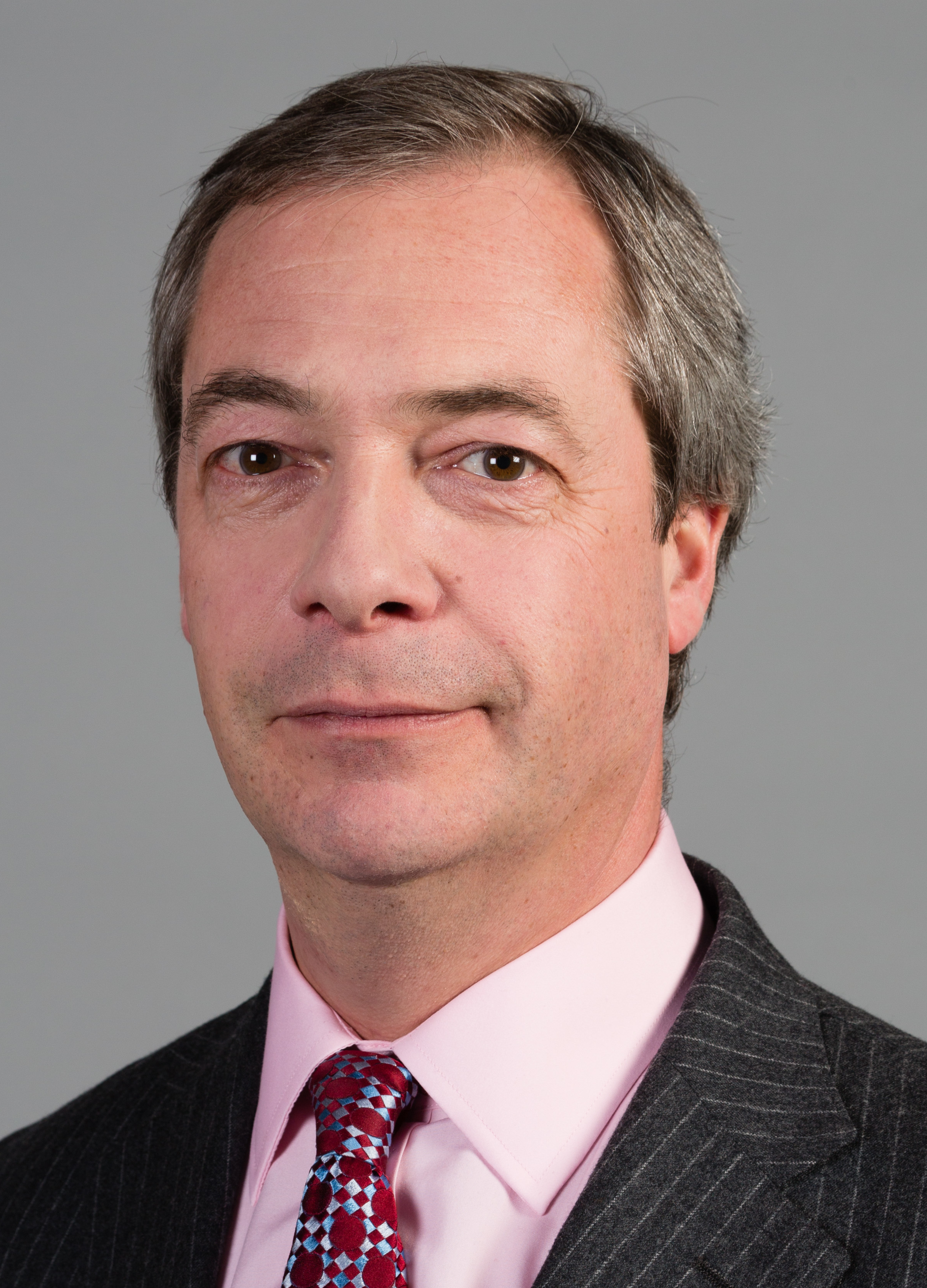

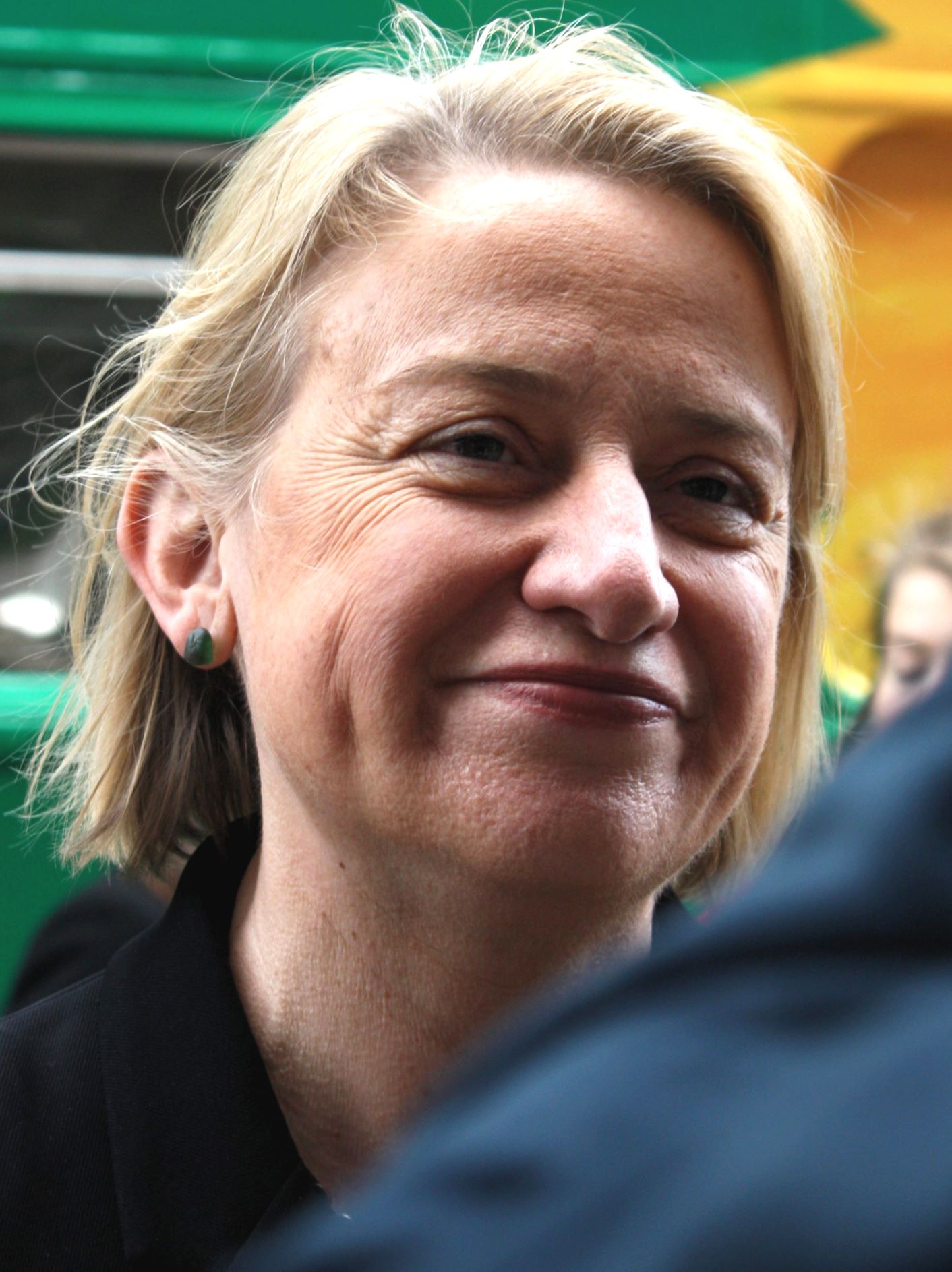
	First party	Second party	Third party
Leader	David Cameron	Ed Miliband	Nick Clegg
Party	Conservative	Labour	Liberal Democrats
Leader since	6 December 2005	25 September 2010	18 December 2007
Leader's seat	Witney	Doncaster North	Sheffield Hallam
Last election	297 seats, 39.5%	191 seats, 28.1%	43 seats, 24.2%
Seats won	318*	206	6
Seat change	▲21	▲15	▼37
Popular vote	10,448,644	8,087,653	2,098,458
Percentage	40.9%	31.6%	8.2%
Swing	▲1.4 pp	▲3.6 pp	▼16.0 pp
	Fourth party	Fifth party
Leader	Nigel Farage	Natalie Bennett
Party	UKIP	Green
Leader since	5 November 2010	3 September 2012
Leader's seat	Ran in South Thanet (defeated)	Ran in Holborn and St Pancras (lost)
Last election	1 seat, 3.5%	1 seat, 1.0%
Seats before	0	1
Seats won	1	1
Seat change	▲1	Steady
Popular vote	3,611,367	1,073,259
Percentage	14.1%	4.2%
Swing	▲10.7 pp	▲3.2 pp
- A map of English parliamentary constituencies *Seat figure does not include the Speaker of the House of Commons, John Bercow, who was included in the Conservative seat total by some media outlets.

On Thursday 7 May 2015, the 2015 United Kingdom general election was held in England, to elect all 650 members of the House of Commons, with 533 constituencies being in England. The Conservatives won a majority of seats in England for the second time since 1992.

Both major parties made gains at the expense of the Liberal Democrats, whose support collapsed to its lowest level since 1970. Their vote share declined by 16 percentage points, and the party lost 37 of its 43 seats. The party won 6 seats and 8% of the vote overall. This was the worst result for the Lib Dems or the Liberals in 45 years, while the 16-point drop in vote share was the biggest decline in Lib Dem or Liberal support since 1931.

Although Labour increased their share of the vote by 4% and gained 15 seats, the Conservatives made 21 gains for a total of 318, including winning 6 seats directly from Labour. Together with seats from Scotland and Wales, this allowed the Conservatives to form a majority government with 330 seats, leading to the first majority Conservative government since 1992.

== Political context ==
The general election was fought with the Conservatives and the Liberal Democrats having been in coalition since 2010, with Labour being the main opposition, though with the Conservatives holding the majority of English seats. It was also fought following the victory of the UK Independence Party at the European Parliament Elections and in two by-elections the year before, along with George Galloway of the Respect Party having won the 2012 Bradford West by-election from Labour.

== Candidates ==
Below is a table summarising the candidates of the 2015 general election in England, showing parties that stood 10 or more candidates each.

Affiliation	Candidates
UK Independence Party	533
Conservative and Unionist Party	532
Labour Party	532
Liberal Democrats	532
Green Party of England and Wales	502
Trade Unionist and Socialist Coalition	107
English Democrats	31
Cannabis Is Safer Than Alcohol	19
Christian Peoples Alliance	17
Yorkshire Party	14
Official Monster Raving Loony Party	14
National Health Action Party	11
Others	365
Total	3,209

== Analysis ==
The Conservatives emerged as the largest party, increasing both their seats and votes. They took seats both from the Liberal Democrats and from the Labour Party, as well as holding on to many of their key marginal seats.

Labour increased its numbers both in number of votes and seats after making gains against the Liberal Democrats, along with limited gains against the Conservatives, but failed to become the largest party. Shadow Chancellor Ed Balls lost his seat in Morley and Outwood to the Conservative candidate Andrea Jenkyns, whilst Ed Miliband resigned as Labour leader.

The Liberal Democrats lost the vast majority of their seats, going from 43 seats down to just 6. Leader Nick Clegg, who saw his nearly 30-point majority in Sheffield Hallam massively reduced to 4.2%, resigned on the morning of the election results.

UKIP made large gains in the percentage of votes, but failed to retain Rochester and Strood or take any other seats, leading to the resignation of party leader Nigel Farage. His resignation was rejected, however, and he subsequently stayed on.

The Green Party increased their share of the vote and held Brighton Pavilion, but failed to gain any new seats.

== Results ==
Below is a table summarising the results of the 2015 general election in England, showing all parties above 500 votes.

Party	Seats					Aggregate Votes		
Party	Total	Gains	Losses	Net	Of all (%)	Total	Of all (%)	Change (%)
Conservative	318	32	11	▲21	59.7	10,448,644	40.9	▲1.4
Labour	206	21	6	▲15	38.6	8,087,653	31.6	▲3.6
UKIP	1	1	0	▲1	0.2	3,611,367	14.1	▲10.7
Liberal Democrats	6	0	37	▼37	1.1	2,098,458	8.2	▼16.0
Green	1	0	0	Steady	0.2	1,073,259	4.2	▲3.2
Speaker	1	0	0	Steady	0.2	34,617	0.1	Steady
TUSC	0	0	0	Steady	—	30,561	0.1	▲0.1
NHA	0	New			—	12,999	0.1	New
Respect	0	0	0	Steady	—	9,989	0.0	▼0.1
Health Concern	0	0	0	Steady	—	7,211	0.0	▼0.1
Yorkshire	0	New			—	6,811	0.0	New
English Democrat	0	0	0	Steady	—	6,431	0.0	▼0.3
Mebyon Kernow	0	0	0	Steady	—	5,675	0.0	Steady
Lincolnshire Independent	0	0	0	Steady	—	5,407	0.0	Steady
CISTA	0	New			—	4,569	0.0	New
Liberal	0	0	0	Steady	—	4,480	0.0	Steady
Monster Raving Loony	0	0	0	Steady	—	3,432	0.0	Steady
CPA	0	0	0	Steady	—	3,260	0.0	Steady
Left Unity	0	New			—	2,762	0.0	New
North East	0	New			—	2,138	0.0	New
Poole People	0	New			—	1,766	0.0	New
BNP	0	0	0	Steady	—	1,667	0.0	▼2.1
R4U	0	New			—	1,658	0.0	New
Rochdale First	0	New			—	1,535	0.0	New
Christian	0	0	0	Steady	—	1,407	0.0	▼0.1
Communities United	0	New			—	1,102	0.0	New
People Before Profit	0	New			—	1,056	0.0	New
We Are The Reality	0	New			—	1,029	0.0	New
Pirate	0	0	0	Steady	—	1,024	0.0	Steady
Southport Party	0	New			—	992	0.0	New
All People's Party	0	New			—	981	0.0	New
Peace	0	0	0	Steady	—	957	0.0	Steady
Bournemouth Independent	0	New			—	903	0.0	New
Alliance for Green Socialism	0	0	0	Steady	—	852	0.0	Steady
Socialist (GB)	0	0	0	Steady	—	850	0.0	Steady
Save Hartlepool Hospital	0	New			—	849	0.0	New
Communist	0	0	0	Steady	—	763	0.0	Steady
National Front	0	0	0	Steady	—	759	0.0	Steady
Animal Welfare	0	0	0	Steady	—	736	0.0	Steady
Something New	0	New			—	695	0.0	New
Consensus	0	New			—	637	0.0	New
National Liberal	0	New			—	627	0.0	New
Independence from Europe	0	New			—	578	0.0	New
Whig	0	New			—	561	0.0	New
GGG	0	New			—	538	0.0	New
Class War	0	New			—	526	0.0	New
Others and Independents	0	—N/a			—	86,084	0.3	—N/a
Total	533			0	100.0	25,570,900	100.0	0.0
Registered voters, and turnout						38,736,649	66.0	▲0.5

Popular vote
Conservative	40.9%
Labour	31.6%
UKIP	14.1%
Liberal Democrats	8.2%
Green	4.2%
Other	0.9%

Parliament seats
Conservative	59.7%
Labour	38.6%
Liberal Democrats	1.1%
UKIP	0.2%
Green	0.2%
Speaker	0.2%

== By region ==
Regional vote shares and changes are sourced from the House of Commons Library.

=== East Midlands ===
Party	Seats					Aggregate Votes		
Party	Total	Gains	Losses	Net	Of all (%)	Total	Of all (%)	Change (%)
Conservative	32	1	0	▲1	69.6	969,379	43.5	▲2.3
Labour	14	0	1	▼1	30.4	705,767	31.6	▲1.9
UKIP	0	0	0	Steady	0.0	351,777	15.8	▲12.5
Liberal Democrats	0	0	0	Steady	0.0	124,039	5.6	▼15.3
Green	0	0	0	Steady	0.0	66,239	3.0	▲2.4
Others	0	0	0	Steady	0.0	13,201	0.6	—
Total	46					2,230,402	65.5	▼1.0

=== East of England ===
Party	Seats					Aggregate Votes		
Party	Total	Gains	Losses	Net	Of all (%)	Total	Of all (%)	Change (%)
Conservative	52	1	1	Steady	89.7	1,445,946	49.0	▲1.9
Labour	4	2	0	▲2	6.9	649,321	22.0	▲2.4
UKIP	1	1	0	▲1	1.7	478,517	16.2	▲12.0
Liberal Democrats	1	0	3	▼3	1.7	243,191	8.2	▼15.8
Green	0	0	0	Steady	0.0	116,274	3.9	▲2.5
Others	0	0	0	Steady	0.0	15,374	0.5	—
Total	58					2,948,623	67.5	▲0.2

=== Greater London ===
Party	Seats					Aggregate Votes		
Party	Total	Gains	Losses	Net	Of all (%)	Total	Of all (%)	Change (%)
Labour	45	7	0	▲7	61.6	1,545,048	43.7	▲7.3
Conservative	27	3	4	▼1	37.0	1,233,386	34.9	▲0.3
UKIP	0	0	0	Steady	0.0	286,981	8.1	▲6.4
Liberal Democrats	1	0	6	▼6	1.4	272,544	7.7	▼14.4
Green	0	0	0	Steady	0.0	171,670	4.9	▲3.3
Others	0	0	0	Steady	0.0	26,622	0.8	—
Total	73					3,536,251	65.4	▲0.8

Greater London

=== North East England ===
Party	Seats					Aggregate Votes		
Party	Total	Gains	Losses	Net	Of all (%)	Total	Of all (%)	Change (%)
Labour	26	1	0	▲1	89.7	557,100	46.9	▲3.3
Conservative	3	1	0	▲1	10.3	300,883	25.3	▲1.6
UKIP	0	0	0	Steady	0.0	198,823	16.7	▲14.0
Liberal Democrats	0	0	2	▼2	0.0	77,095	6.5	▼17.1
Green	0	0	0	Steady	0.0	43,051	3.6	▲3.3
Others	0	0	0	Steady	0.0	11,201	0.9	—
Total	29					1,188,153	61.8	▲0.9

=== North West England ===
Party	Seats					Aggregate Votes		
Party	Total	Gains	Losses	Net	Of all (%)	Total	Of all (%)	Change (%)
Labour	51	5	1	▲4	68.0	1,502,047	44.6	▲5.2
Conservative	22	3	3	Steady	29.3	1,050,124	31.2	▼0.5
UKIP	0	0	0	Steady	0.0	459,071	13.6	▲10.5
Liberal Democrats	2	0	4	▼4	2.7	219,998	6.5	▼15.1
Green	0	0	0	Steady	0.0	107,889	3.2	▲2.7
Others	0	0	0	Steady	0.0	24,926	0.7	—
Total	75					3,364,055	64.3	▲0.7

=== South East England ===
Party	Seats					Aggregate Votes		
Party	Total	Gains	Losses	Net	Of all (%)	Total	Of all (%)	Change (%)
Conservative	78	5	1	▲4	92.9	2,234,360	50.8	▲1.5
Labour	4	1	1	Steady	4.8	804,774	18.3	▼0.5
UKIP	0	0	0	Steady	0.0	646,959	14.7	▲10.6
Liberal Democrats	0	0	4	▼4	0.0	413,586	9.4	▼16.8
Green	1	0	0	Steady	1.2	227,882	5.2	▲3.7
Speaker	1	0	0	Steady	1.2	34,617	0.8	—
Others	0	0	0	Steady	0.0	32,315	0.7	—
Total	84					4,394,493	68.6	▲0.6

=== South West England ===
Party	Seats					Aggregate Votes		
Party	Total	Gains	Losses	Net	Of all (%)	Total	Of all (%)	Change (%)
Conservative	51	15	0	▲15	92.7	1,319,994	46.5	▲3.7
Labour	4	1	1	Steady	7.3	501,684	17.7	▲2.3
Liberal Democrats	0	0	15	▼15	0.0	428,927	15.1	▼19.6
UKIP	0	0	0	Steady	0.0	384,546	13.6	▲9.1
Green	0	0	0	Steady	0.0	168,130	5.9	▲4.8
Others	0	0	0	Steady	0.0	33,013	1.2	—
Total	55					2,836,294	69.5	▲0.4

=== West Midlands ===
Party	Seats					Aggregate Votes		
Party	Total	Gains	Losses	Net	Of all (%)	Total	Of all (%)	Change (%)
Conservative	34	2	1	▲1	57.6	1,097,750	41.8	▲2.2
Labour	25	2	1	▲1	42.4	865,075	32.9	▲2.3
UKIP	0	0	0	Steady	0.0	412,770	15.7	▲11.7
Liberal Democrats	0	0	2	▼2	0.0	145,009	5.5	▼14.9
Green	0	0	0	Steady	0.0	85,653	3.3	▲2.7
Others	0	0	0	Steady	0.0	22,322	0.8	—
Total	59					2,628,579	64.1	▼0.5

=== Yorkshire and the Humber ===
Party	Seats					Aggregate Votes		
Party	Total	Gains	Losses	Net	Of all (%)	Total	Of all (%)	Change (%)
Labour	33	2	1	▲1	61.1	956,837	39.1	▲4.8
Conservative	19	1	1	Steady	35.2	796,822	32.6	▼0.2
UKIP	0	0	0	Steady	0.0	391,923	16.0	▲13.2
Liberal Democrats	2	0	1	▼1	3.7	174,069	7.1	▼15.8
Green	0	0	0	Steady	0.0	86,471	3.5	▲2.7
Others	0	0	0	Steady	0.0	38,055	1.6	—
Total	54					2,444,177	63.1	▼0.1

== Campaign events ==
- 31 March: First official day of the general election campaign
- 13 April: The Labour Party launches its manifesto
- 14 April: The Conservative Party and the Green Party launch their manifestos
- 15 April: UKIP and the Liberal Democrats launch their manifestos
- 7 May: BBC Exit poll shows the Conservatives as the largest single party
- 8 May: The Conservatives emerge as the largest party in England, gaining a majority of MPs in the House of Commons and forming the next Government of the United Kingdom as a majority, contrary to predictions made at the start of the election campaign.

== Target seats ==
The recorded swing in each case is calculated as two-way swing from the party that won in 2010 to the party targeting the seat. Negative swing implies that the targeting party lost votes to the incumbent party.

=== Conservative Party ===
Rank	Constituency	Region	Winning party 2010	Swing required (%)	Result	Swing to CON (±%)
1	Hampstead and Kilburn	London	Labour	0.10	Labour hold	-1.0
2	Bolton West	North West England	Labour	0.10	Conservative gain	+0.9
3	Solihull	West Midlands	Liberal Democrats	0.16	Conservative gain	+11.9
4	Southampton Itchen	South East England	Labour	0.22	Conservative gain	+2.8
5	Mid Dorset and North Poole	South West England	Liberal Democrats	0.29	Conservative gain	+11.6
6	Wirral South	North West England	Labour	0.66	Labour hold	-4.8
7	Derby North	East Midlands	Labour	0.68	Conservative gain	+0.8
8	Wells	South West England	Liberal Democrats	0.72	Conservative gain	+7.4
9	Dudley North	West Midlands	Labour	0.84	Labour hold	-4.7
10	Great Grimsby	Yorkshire and the Humber	Labour	1.08	Labour hold	-5.7

=== Labour Party ===
Rank	Constituency	Region	Winning party 2010	Swing required (%)	Result	Swing to LAB (±%)
1	North Warwickshire	West Midlands	Conservative	0.06	Conservative hold	−3.1
2	Thurrock	South East England	Conservative	0.10	Conservative hold	−0.5
3	Hendon	London	Conservative	0.11	Conservative hold	−3.7
4	Sherwood	East Midlands	Conservative	0.22	Conservative hold	−4.4
5	Norwich South	East of England	Liberal Democrats	0.33	Labour gain	+13.2
6	Stockton South	North East England	Conservative	0.33	Conservative hold	−4.6
7	Broxtowe	East Midlands	Conservative	0.37	Conservative hold	−3.7
8	Lancaster and Fleetwood	North West England	Conservative	0.39	Labour gain	+1.9
9	Bradford East	Yorkshire and the Humber	Liberal Democrats	0.45	Labour gain	+9.0
10	Amber Valley	East Midlands	Conservative	0.58	Conservative hold	−4.1

=== Liberal Democrats ===
Rank	Constituency	Region	Winning party 2010	Swing required (%)	Result	Swing to LD (±%)
1	Camborne and Redruth	South West England	Conservative	0.08	Conservative hold	−13.8
2	Oxford West and Abingdon	South East England	Conservative	0.16	Conservative hold	−8.3
3	Sheffield Central	Yorkshire and the Humber	Labour	0.20	Labour hold	−22.5
4	Ashfield	East Midlands	Labour	0.20	Labour hold	−12.9
5	Truro and Falmouth	South West England	Conservative	0.45	Conservative hold	−13.2

=== UKIP ===
Rank	Constituency	Region	Winning party 2010	Swing required (%)	Result	Swing to UKIP (±%)
1	Thanet South	South East England	Conservative	21.2	Conservative hold	+18.4
2	Thurrock	East of England	Conservative	14.7	Conservative hold	+13.7
3	Castle Point	East of England	Conservative	(No candidate in 2010)	Conservative hold	(Vote share: 31.2%)
4	Boston and Skegness	East of England	Conservative	20.0	Conservative hold	+15.0
5	Great Grimsby	Yorkshire and the Humber	Labour	13.3	Labour hold	+5.9

=== Green Party ===
Swing for the Greens is measured as one-party swing, i.e. the change in the party's share of the vote.

Rank	Constituency	Region	Winning party 2010	Result	Swing to GRN (±%)
1	Norwich South	East of England	Liberal Democrats	Labour gain	−1.0
2	Bristol West	South East England	Liberal Democrats	Labour gain	+23.0
3	St Ives	South West England	Liberal Democrats	Conservative gain	+3.5
4	Sheffield Central	Yorkshire and the Humber	Labour	Labour hold	+12.1
5	Liverpool Riverside	North West England	Labour	Labour hold	+8.6

== Opinion polling ==
Date(s) conducted	Polling organisation/client	Sample size	Con	Lab	LD	UKIP	Green	Others	Lead
7 May 2015	General Election 2015 Results	25,571,204	41.0%	31.6%	8.2%	14.1%	4.2%	0.9%	9.4%
30 Apr–1 May 2015	Survation/Daily Mirror	978	36%	34%	10%	17%	4%	<0.5%	2%
30 Apr 2015	Question Time featuring David Cameron, Nick Clegg and Ed Miliband broadcast on BBC One; Ask Nicola Sturgeon, Ask Leanne Wood and Ask Nigel Farage programmes also shown								
27–28 Apr 2015	ComRes/ITV News, Daily Mail	872	36%	36%	8%	12%	6%	2%	Tied
25–27 Apr 2015	BMG/May2015.com	877	39%	31%	11%	15%	4%	<0.5%	8%
24–26 Apr 2015	Lord Ashcroft	870	37%	32%	9%	12%	8%	1%	5%
24–26 Apr 2015	ICM/The Guardian	863	39%	32%	7%	15%	6%	<0.5%	7%
24–25 Apr 2015	Survation/Mail on Sunday	879	36%	31%	9%	20%	4%	<0.5%	5%
21–24 Apr 2015	Opinium/The Observer	1,668	36%	33%	9%	15%	7%	1%	3%
22–23 Apr 2015	Survation/Daily Mirror	1,072	36%	29%	10%	20%	5%	<0.5%	7%
21–22 Apr 2015	ComRes/ITV News, Daily Mail	890	39%	34%	8%	11%	5%	3%	5%
17–19 Apr 2015	Lord Ashcroft	863	36%	33%	9%	14%	5%	2%	3%
17–19 Apr 2015	ICM/The Guardian	863	38%	35%	9%	12%	5%	1%	3%
16–17 Apr 2015	Opinium/The Observer	1,655	38%	32%	9%	14%	6%	1%	6%
16–17 Apr 2015	Survation/Daily Mirror	986	35%	34%	8%	18%	3%	1%	1%
16 Apr 2015	Five-way Opposition Leaders' Debate held on BBC One								
12–15 Apr 2015	Ipsos MORI/Evening Standard	600	35%	37%	8%	11%	8%	1%	2%
10–12 Apr 2015	Lord Ashcroft	870	34%	36%	9%	14%	6%	1%	2%
10–12 Apr 2015	ICM/The Guardian	900	41%	35%	7%	8%	8%	1%	6%
8–9 Apr 2015	Opinium/The Observer	1,626	39%	35%	8%	12%	6%	1%	4%
8–9 Apr 2015	Survation/Daily Mirror	838	33%	36%	9%	16%	5%	1%	3%
7–8 Apr 2015	ComRes/ITV News, Daily Mail	718	36%	35%	11%	13%	4%	1%	1%
2–3 Apr 2015	Survation/Daily Mirror	856	34%	33%	9%	21%	3%	<0.5%	1%
2–3 Apr 2015	Opinium/The Observer	1,710	35%	34%	7%	15%	7%	1%	1%
2 Apr 2015	Seven-way Leaders' Debate on ITV								
30 Mar 2015	Dissolution of Parliament and the official start of the election campaign								
28–29 Mar 2015	ComRes/ITV News, Daily Mail	864	38%	32%	9%	13%	6%	2%	6%
27–29 Mar 2015	Lord Ashcroft	865	40%	34%	7%	11%	7%	1%	6%
26 Mar 2015	First TV election interview by Jeremy Paxman with David Cameron and Ed Miliband on Sky and Channel 4								
24–25 Mar 2015	Opinium/The Observer	1,690	35%	34%	9%	13%	7%	<0.5%	1%
24–25 Mar 2015	Survation/Daily Mirror	851	34%	34%	8%	20%	4%	<0.5%	Tied
20–22 Mar 2015	ComRes/ITV News, Daily Mail	864	38%	35%	8%	11%	7%	1%	3%
20–22 Mar 2015	Lord Ashcroft	860	36%	33%	8%	14%	6%	2%	3%
20–21 Mar 2015	Survation/Mail on Sunday	861	31%	35%	10%	19%	3%	1%	4%
18–19 Mar 2015	Opinium/The Observer	1,702	37%	33%	7%	14%	7%	1%	4%
13–15 Mar 2015	Lord Ashcroft	863	34%	29%	8%	18%	9%	3%	5%
13–15 Mar 2015	ICM/The Guardian	910	38%	37%	6%	11%	5%	3%	1%
10–12 Mar 2015	Opinium/The Observer	1,654	35%	35%	7%	15%	7%	<0.5%	Tied
8–11 Mar 2015	Ipsos MORI/Evening Standard	863	34%	37%	8%	14%	6%	1%	3%
6–8 Mar 2015	Lord Ashcroft	859	36%	31%	5%	18%	9%	1%	5%
3–6 Mar 2015	Opinium/The Observer	1,626	36%	33%	7%	15%	7%	3%	3%
27 Feb–1 Mar 2015	Lord Ashcroft	860	36%	32%	8%	14%	7%	2%	4%
24–26 Feb 2015	Opinium/The Observer	1,679	35%	36%	7%	14%	6%	1%	1%
23 Feb 2015	Survation/Daily Mirror	921	30%	34%	10%	21%	3%	2%	4%
20–23 Feb 2015	ComRes/Daily Mail	865	36%	32%	7%	14%	9%	2%	4%
20–22 Feb 2015	Lord Ashcroft	867	32%	38%	6%	13%	8%	2%	6%
17–20 Feb 2015	Opinium/The Observer	1,704	36%	33%	7%	16%	7%	1%	3%
13–15 Feb 2015	Lord Ashcroft	863	31%	31%	9%	18%	9%	3%	Tied
13–15 Feb 2015	ICM/The Guardian	860	38%	34%	7%	10%	8%	2%	4%
10–12 Feb 2015	Opinium/The Observer	1,713	35%	35%	8%	15%	5%	1%	Tied
8–10 Feb 2015	Ipsos MORI/Evening Standard	844	38%	37%	7%	10%	8%	0%	1%
6–8 Feb 2015	Lord Ashcroft	860	36%	31%	9%	16%	7%	1%	5%
3–6 Feb 2015	Opinium/The Observer	1,947	33%	35%	7%	15%	8%	2%	2%
30 Jan–1 Feb 2015	Lord Ashcroft	857	34%	30%	8%	17%	10%	1%	4%
25 Jan 2015	Survation/Daily Mirror	890	34%	30%	7%	25%	4%	<0.5%	4%
23–25 Jan 2015	ComRes/The Independent	852	33%	29%	9%	20%	8%	1%	4%
22–25 Jan 2015	Lord Ashcroft	859	33%	34%	5%	17%	9%	2%	1%
16–19 Jan 2015	ICM/The Guardian	863	32%	35%	8%	14%	10%	1%	3%
16–18 Jan 2015	Lord Ashcroft	871	31%	27%	9%	17%	12%	4%	4%
11–13 Jan 2015	Ipsos MORI/Evening Standard	854	35%	35%	8%	12%	8%	2%	Tied
9–11 Jan 2015	Lord Ashcroft	858	37%	29%	7%	17%	8%	2%	8%
12–16 Dec 2014	ICM/The Guardian	861	31%	33%	11%	17%	5%	3%	2%
13–15 Dec 2014	Ipsos MORI/Evening Standard	840	36%	31%	9%	14%	10%	0%	5%
12–14 Dec 2014	ComRes/The Independent	897	29%	34%	12%	17%	6%	2%	5%
5–7 Dec 2014	Lord Ashcroft	860	31%	31%	7%	23%	6%	2%	Tied
6 May 2010	General Election Results	25,085,097	39.6%	28.1%	24.2%	3.5%	1.0%	3.6%	11.5%

== Donations ==
Electoral commission data shows that in 2015 Q2, total donations for each major political party, over £7,500, are as follows:

Party	Donations
Conservative	£9,159,884
Labour	£8,783,492
Liberal Democrats	£2,434,159
UKIP	£2,203,921
Green	£55,152

== See also ==
- 2015 United Kingdom general election in Northern Ireland
- 2015 United Kingdom general election in Scotland
- 2015 United Kingdom general election in Wales
