= 2015 United Kingdom general election in Scotland =

- 7 May 2015

All 59 Scottish seats to the House of Commons
- Turnout: 71.1% (▲7.3%)
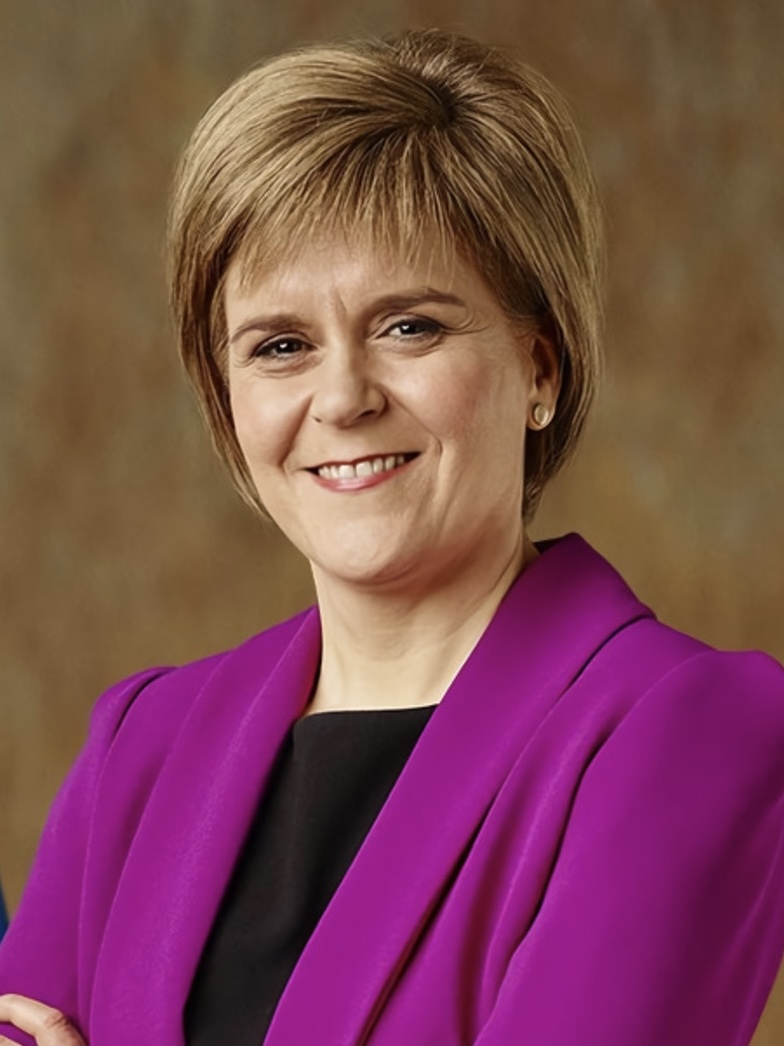

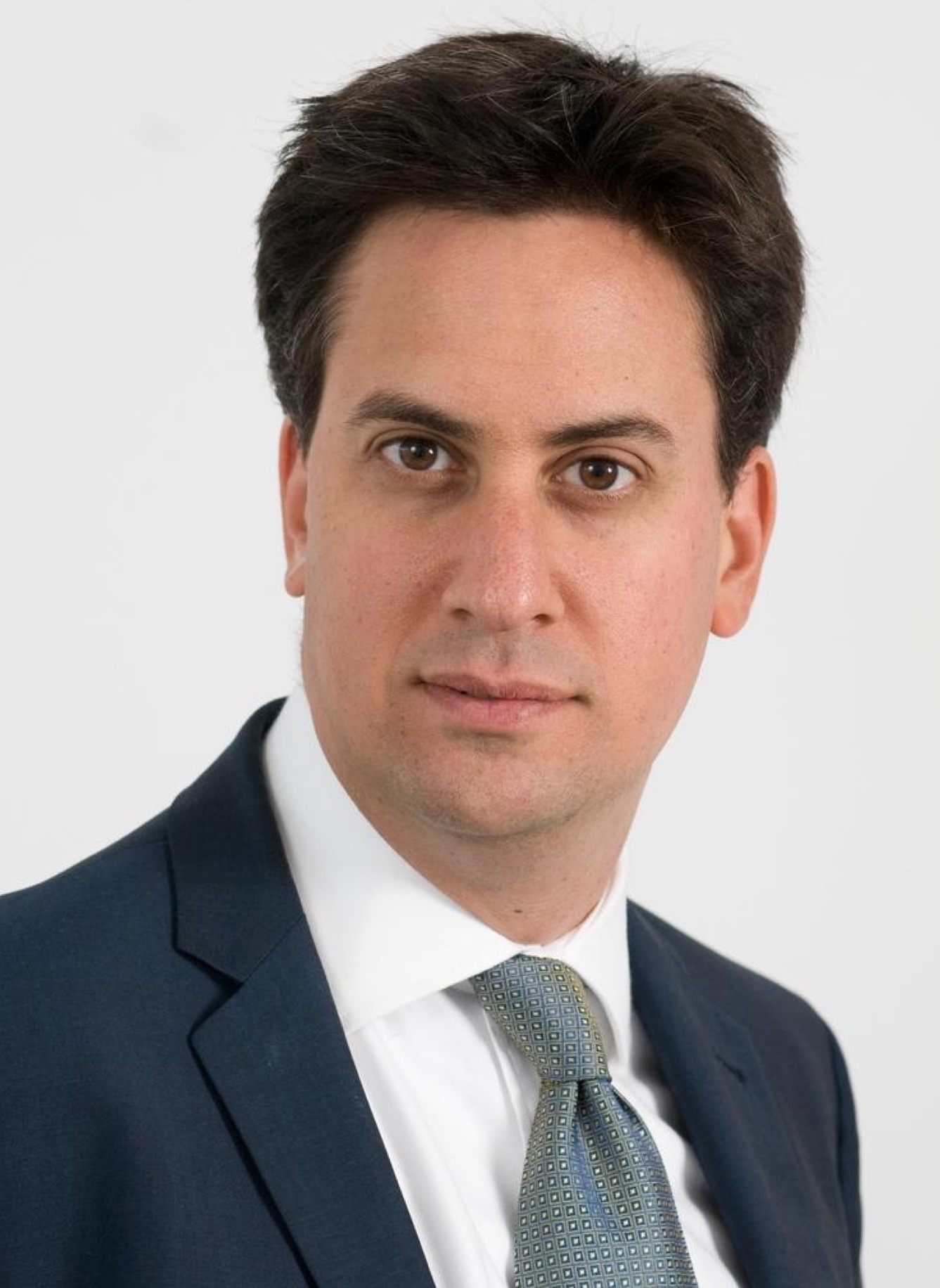

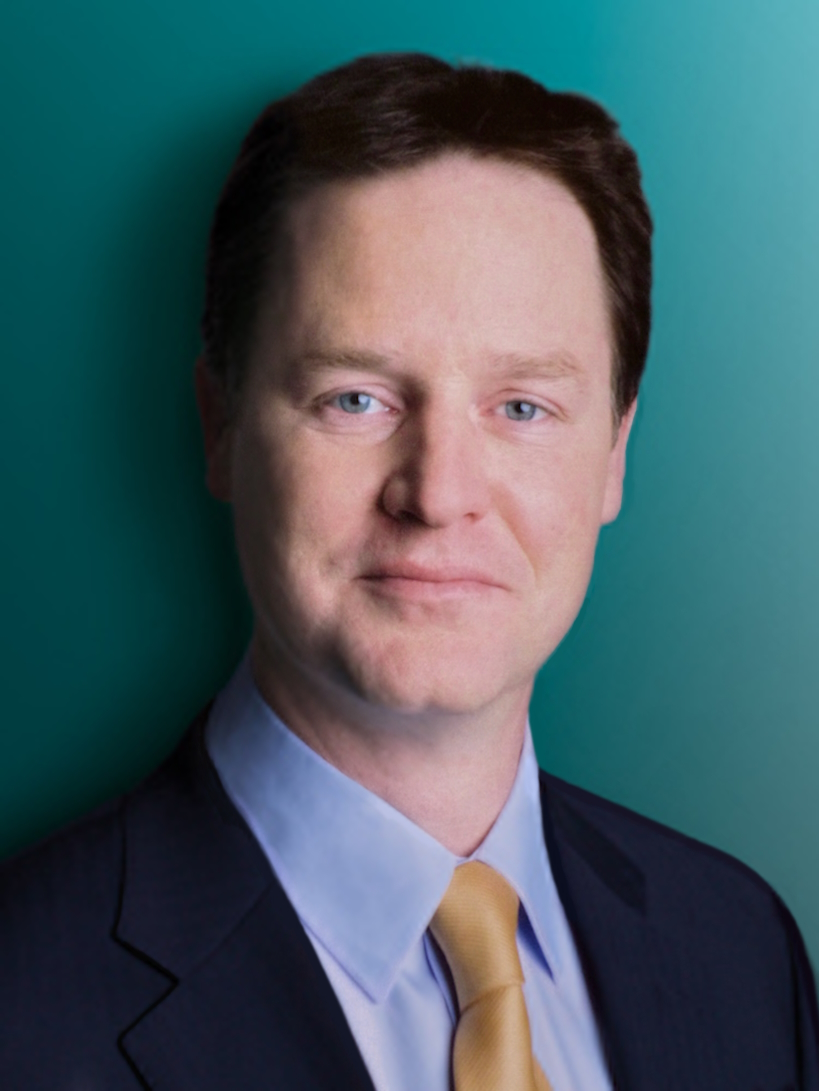
	First party	Second party
Leader	Nicola Sturgeon	Ed Miliband
Party	SNP	Labour
Leader since	14 November 2014	25 September 2010
Leader's seat	Did not stand	Doncaster North
Last election	6 seats, 19.9%	41 seats, 42.0%
Seats won	56	1
Seat change	▲50	▼40
Popular vote	1,454,436	707,147
Percentage	50.0%	24.3%
Swing	▲30.1 pp	▼17.7 pp
	Third party	Fourth party
Leader	David Cameron	Nick Clegg
Party	Conservative	Liberal Democrats
Leader since	6 December 2005	18 December 2007
Leader's seat	Witney	Sheffield Hallam
Last election	1 seat, 16.7%	11 seats, 18.9%
Seats won	1	1
Seat change	Steady	▼10
Popular vote	434,097	219,675
Percentage	14.9%	7.6%
Swing	▼1.8 pp	▼11.4 pp
- Coloured according to the winning party's vote share in each constituency

A general election was held in the United Kingdom on 7 May 2015 and all 59 seats in Scotland were contested under the first-past-the-post, single-member district electoral system. Unlike the 2010 general election, where no seats changed party, the Scottish National Party (SNP) won all but three seats in Scotland, gaining a total of 56 seats. The SNP received what remains the largest number of votes gained by a single political party in a United Kingdom general election in Scotland in British history, breaking the previous record set by the Labour Party in 1964 and taking the largest share of the Scottish vote in sixty years, at approximately 50 per cent.

The Labour Party suffered its worst ever election defeat in Scotland, losing 40 of the 41 seats it was defending, including the seats of Scottish Labour leader Jim Murphy and the then Shadow Foreign Secretary Douglas Alexander. The Liberal Democrats lost ten of the eleven seats they were defending, with the then Chief Secretary to the Treasury Danny Alexander and former leader Charles Kennedy losing their seats. The election also saw the worst performance by the Scottish Conservative Party, which received its lowest share of the vote since its creation in 1965, although it retained the one seat that it previously held. In all, 50 of the 59 seats changed party, 49 of them being won by first-time MPs.

The general election in Scotland was fought in the aftermath of the 2014 Scottish independence referendum, in which 1,617,989 voters (44.7%) backed independence while 2,001,926 (55.3%) did not. The referendum saw a record turnout of 84.59%, the "highest turnout in any nationwide ballot in Scotland since the advent of the mass franchise after the First World War". There was speculation as to whether this would significantly affect the turnout in the general election. An immediate consequence of the referendum was a massive rise in the membership of the pro-independence parties, with the SNP in particular adding 60,000 to its membership to reach over 85,000 within two months of the referendum.

== Political context ==
Since 2005, the Scottish National Party had come first in the 2007 Scottish Parliament election as well as the 2009 European Parliament election. In Westminster, however, it was a different story: although in 2008 the party won the Glasgow East by-election, in what was one of the safest Labour seats in the UK, by the time of the 2010 general election and even with an increase of 2.3% in the vote, it only managed to retain the seats it had won in the 2005 general election. A year later, in the 2011 Scottish Parliament election, the SNP became the first majority government since the opening of Holyrood – a remarkable feat, for the mixed-member proportional representation system used to elect MSPs makes the acquisition of a single-party majority challenging. The SNP gained 32 constituencies, 22 of which came from Scottish Labour, nine from the Scottish Liberal Democrats and one from the Scottish Conservatives. Such was the scale of their gains that, of the 73 constituencies in Scotland, only 20 were represented by MSPs of other political parties in 2011.

The SNP's majority in the Scottish Parliament allowed it to legislate for a referendum on Scottish independence. This was held in 2014, and the proposal for independence was defeated by 10.6 percentage points. In spite of this, the campaign in favour of independence made a set of significant inroads across the Central Belt of Scotland, a region which has traditionally had a strong affiliation with the Labour Party. The Yes campaign took 44.7% of the vote in Scotland on a high turnout of 84.6%: well beyond the SNP's 19.9% vote share at the 2010 UK general election. This took form at the 2015 UK general election with a saturation of the SNP vote in areas which had a higher "Yes" vote at the 2014 Scottish independence referendum.

Scottish Labour had held the majority of seats in Scotland in every general election since the 1960s, and many prominent government officials represented Scottish constituencies, such as the Prime Minister Gordon Brown and the Chancellor Alistair Darling. In the 2010 election, the Labour Party in Scotland increased its share of the vote by 2.5% and re-gained the Glasgow East and Dunfermline and West Fife constituencies giving them 41 out of 59 seats in Scotland. At the 2011 Scottish Parliament election, Labour lost out to the SNP across much of the central belt of Scotland, holding on to 15 out of 73 constituency seats in Scotland.

In 2015 Labour lost 40 of its 41 Scottish constituencies at the UK Parliament, with Edinburgh South becoming the only constituency in Scotland to have a Labour MP after the election. The party lost out heavily to the SNP in working-class areas around central Scotland, with Scottish Labour's safest constituency (Glasgow North East) returning the largest swing in the election at 39.3% from Labour to SNP. The party performed best in its more affluent constituencies, with Scottish Labour's leader Jim Murphy missing out in his former constituency of East Renfrewshire by just 6.6% of the vote. Labour's next closest constituency result came in Edinburgh North and Leith, where they missed out to the SNP by 9.6% of the vote, and in East Lothian, where the SNP polled ahead of Labour by 11.5% of the vote.

In the context of a broader collapse in the party's support across Great Britain at the end five years as part of a coalition UK Government with the conservatives, the Scottish Liberal Democrats lost 10 of its 11 Westminster constituencies from 2010, with its safest constituency in Great Britain - Orkney and Shetland - becoming the only Liberal Democrat constituency in Scotland. They marginally lost out to the SNP in East Dunbartonshire, where former Lib Dem MP Jo Swinson lost out to the SNP by 4% of the vote. Among those to lose their constituency at the election were former Liberal Democrat leader Charles Kennedy and the Chief Secretary to the Treasury, Danny Alexander. The Liberal Democrats came third in Berwickshire, Roxburgh and Selkirk and West Aberdeenshire and Kincardine, constituencies which they had held in the previous election.

The Scottish Conservatives have not held a majority of Scottish seats in a general election since 1955 and it lost all eleven of its seats in the election of 1997. From 2001 until 2017, the party only held one Westminster seat in Scotland. In 2005, following the re-organisation of Scottish constituencies, that seat was Dumfriesshire, Clydesdale and Tweeddale, a mostly rural constituency near the Scottish borders. In 2010 its share of the vote in Scotland increased by roughly 0.9% and it retained the Dumfriesshire, Clydesdale and Tweeddale, as its only Scottish constituency. It had been reported the party could gain Berwickshire, Roxburgh and Selkirk, a seat which they lost out on to the SNP by 0.6% of the vote.

Minor parties such as the UKIP and the Scottish Greens announced that they would contest more Scottish seats than they did in the 2010 election. UKIP targeted the sole Conservative seat in Scotland, as well as standing candidates in several others. The British National Party also announced its intention to contest more seats than in 2010, though in the event did not stand a single candidate in a Scottish constituency. The Scottish Socialist Party stood in four constituencies.

The prospect of an electoral alliance between pro-independence parties—specifically the SNP, the Greens, and the Scottish Socialist Party—was raised after the referendum and supported by elected SNP politicians, but played down by Green co-convenor Patrick Harvie, who said party members did not want their "distinctive Green perspective" to be lost. The SSP supported negotiations for a formal alliance until late in 2014.

== Campaign events ==
- 31 March – The first official day of the election campaign got under way, with the Scottish Greens becoming the first party to launch their manifesto.
- 7 April – First TV debate was broadcast on STV
- 8 April – Second TV debate was broadcast on BBC Scotland, with UKIP and the Scottish Greens included.
- 10 April – Ed Miliband visits Edinburgh, claiming the SNP's aim to have full control of tax in Scotland would create a £7.6bn financial "black hole".
- 12 April – Third TV debate was broadcast on BBC Scotland, between the four main parties. The debate was criticised, with many of the public claiming it was a "Rammy".
- 21 April – John Major entered into the row, and repeated claims by David Cameron that an Labour-SNP government would be a "recipe for mayhem" and entering blackmail. A number of former Conservative ministers entered into the debate claiming deep unease about the rhetoric. Lord Tebbit described Cameron's repeated warnings about the SNP as "puzzling" and "pointless", and might even push Scots to vote tactically for Labour. Lord Forsyth claimed it was playing a "short term and dangerous game" which could further threaten the union. Ed Miliband rejected the claims, while Nicola Sturgeon labelled Sir John's comments as "Silly over the top and an affront to democracy".
- 4 May – Scottish Labour leader Jim Murphy and comedian Eddie Izzard were heckled by opponents while campaigning in Glasgow city centre, with the scene descending into scuffles. SNP leader Nicola Sturgeon condemned the scenes but said they had "nothing to do with the SNP". The following day the SNP placed two members under "administrative suspension".

=== Television debates ===
As in 2010, there were televised debates ahead of the election, featuring the leaders of the four main Scottish parties. The first debate was broadcast on STV on 7 April. The second debate was held on BBC One Scotland on 8 April with additional representatives from the Scottish Greens and UKIP. A follow-up date a few days later took place on Sunday Politics Scotland, The debate was criticised, with many of the public claiming it was a "shambles". The last debate took place on 3 May.

Date	Organisers	Venue	Viewing figures	P Present S Standing-in NI Not invited A Absent I Invited					
Date	Organisers	Venue	Viewing figures	Con	Lab	SNP	LD	Green	UKIP
7 April	STV	Edinburgh		P Davidson	P Murphy	P Sturgeon	P Rennie	NI	NI
8 April	BBC Scotland	Aberdeen		P Davidson	P Murphy	P Sturgeon	P Rennie	P Harvie	P Coburn
12 April	BBC (Sunday Politics Scotland)	Glasgow		P Davidson	P Murphy	P Sturgeon	P Rennie	NI	NI
3 May	BBC Scotland	Edinburgh		P Davidson	P Murphy	P Sturgeon	P Rennie	NI	NI

The leaders from each of the main parties are:

- Scottish Labour – Jim Murphy
- Scottish Conservative and Unionist Party – Ruth Davidson
- Scottish Liberal Democrats – Willie Rennie
- Scottish National Party – Nicola Sturgeon

== Results ==
Party	Seats					Aggregate votes		
Party	Total	Gains	Losses	Net	Of all (%)	Total	Of all (%)	Difference
SNP	56	50	0	▲50	94.9	1,454,436	50.0	▲30.1
Labour	1	0	40	▼40	1.7	707,147	24.3	▼17.7
Conservative	1	0	0	Steady	1.7	434,097	14.9	▼1.8
Liberal Democrats	1	0	10	▼10	1.7	219,675	7.5	▼11.3
UKIP	0	0	0	Steady	—	47,078	1.6	▲0.9
Green	0	0	0	Steady	—	39,205	1.3	▲0.7
Independent	0	0	0	Steady	—	2,455	0.1	—N/a
CISTA	0	New			—	1,807	0.1	New
TUSC	0	0	0	Steady	—	1,720	0.1	Steady
Scottish Christian	0	0	0	Steady	—	1,467	0.1	Steady
Others	0	0	0	Steady	—	1,378	0.5	—N/a
Total	59					2,910,465	71.1	▲7.3

2015 map of Scottish Constituencies - Results

=== Votes summary ===
Popular vote
SNP	49.97%
Labour	24.30%
Conservative	14.92%
Liberal Democrats	7.55%
UKIP	1.62%
Greens	1.35%
Other	0.40%

Parliament seats
SNP	94.92%
Labour	1.69%
Conservative	1.69%
Liberal Democrats	1.69%

== List of constituencies by party ==
2015 UK General Election (Scottish Westminster Constituencies)
Party	Constituency
Labour	Edinburgh South
Liberal Democrats	Orkney and Shetland
SNP	Aberdeen North; Aberdeen South; Airdrie and Shotts; Angus; Argyll and Bute; Ayr, Carrick and Cumnock; Banff and Buchan; Berwickshire, Roxburgh and Selkirk; Caithness, Sutherland and Easter Ross; Central Ayrshire; Coatbridge, Chryston and Bellshill; Cumbernauld, Kilsyth and Kirkintilloch East; Dumfries and Galloway; Dundee East; Dundee West; Dunfermline and West Fife; East Dunbartonshire; East Kilbride, Strathaven and Lesmahagow; East Lothian; East Renfrewshire; Edinburgh East; Edinburgh North and Leith; Edinburgh South West; Edinburgh West; Falkirk; Glasgow Central; Glasgow East; Glasgow North; Glasgow North East; Glasgow North West; Glasgow South; Glasgow South West; Glenrothes; Gordon; Inverclyde; Inverness, Nairn, Badenoch and Strathspey; Kilmarnock and Loudoun; Kirkcaldy and Cowdenbeath; Lanark and Hamilton East; Linlithgow and East Falkirk; Livingston; Midlothian; Moray; Motherwell and Wishaw; Na h-Eileanan an Iar; North Ayrshire and Arran; North East Fife; Ochil and South Perthshire; Paisley and Renfrewshire North; Paisley and Renfrewshire South; Perth and North Perthshire; Ross, Skye and Lochaber; Rutherglen and Hamilton West; Stirling; West Aberdeenshire and Kincardine; West Dunbartonshire
Conservative	Dumfriesshire, Clydesdale and Tweeddale

== Target seats ==
=== Labour Party ===
Rank	Constituency	Winning party 2010	Swing Required	Labour's place 2010	Result
1	Dundee East	SNP	2.27%	2nd	SNP hold
2	East Dunbartonshire	Liberal Democrats	2.28%	2nd	SNP gain
3	Edinburgh West	Liberal Democrats	4.09%	2nd	SNP gain
4	Argyll and Bute	Liberal Democrats	4.47%	3rd	SNP gain
5	Dumfriesshire, Clydesdale and Tweeddale	Conservative	4.57%	2nd	Con. hold

=== Liberal Democrats ===
Rank	Constituency	Winning party 2010	Swing Required	Liberal Democrat's place 2010	Result
1	Edinburgh South	Labour	0.36%	2nd	Lab. hold
2	Edinburgh North and Leith	Labour	1.82%	2nd	SNP gain
3	Aberdeen South	Labour	4.07%	2nd	SNP gain
4	Dunfermline and West Fife	Labour	5.58%	2nd	SNP gain
5	Glasgow North	Labour	6.58%	2nd	SNP gain

=== Scottish National Party ===
Rank	Constituency	Winning party 2010	Swing Required	SNP's place 2010	Result
1	Ochil and South Perthshire	Labour	5.14%	2nd	SNP gain
2	Argyll and Bute	Liberal Democrats	6.37%	4th	SNP gain
3	Gordon	Liberal Democrats	6.92%	2nd	SNP gain
4	Falkirk	Labour	4.53%	2nd	SNP gain
5	Dundee West	Labour	9.80%	2nd	SNP gain

=== Conservative Party ===
Rank	Constituency	Winning party 2010	Swing Required	Conservative's place 2010	Result
1	Argyll and Bute	Liberal Democrats	3.79%	2nd	SNP gain
2	West Aberdeenshire and Kincardine	Liberal Democrats	4.07%	2nd	SNP gain
3	Angus	SNP	4.32%	2nd	SNP hold
4	Perth and North Perthshire	SNP	4.53%	2nd	SNP hold
5	Banff and Buchan	SNP	5.23%	2nd	SNP hold

== Individual MPs ==
=== Re-elected MPs ===
Of the 59 sitting MPs from Scotland at the dissolution of Parliament, 52 stood for re-election, but only 9 were successful:

- Alistair Carmichael (Liberal Democrat), Orkney and Shetland
- Stewart Hosie (SNP), Dundee East
- Angus MacNeil (SNP), Na h-Eileanan an Iar
- David Mundell (Conservative), Dumfriesshire, Clydesdale and Tweeddale
- Ian Murray (Labour), Edinburgh South
- Angus Robertson (SNP), Moray
- Mike Weir (SNP), Angus
- Eilidh Whiteford (SNP), Banff and Buchan
- Pete Wishart (SNP), Perth and North Perthshire

=== Other notable MPs ===
- Alex Salmond (SNP) won Gordon, making him the only former Scottish MP in this election to return to Parliament following a break. He previously served as MP for Banff and Buchan from 1987 to 2010, and therefore had the longest total service of any Scottish MP returned at the 2015 election.
- Mhairi Black (SNP) won Paisley and Renfrewshire South at the age of 20, making her the youngest MP since the Reform Act 1832.

== See also ==
- 2015 United Kingdom general election in England
- 2015 United Kingdom general election in Northern Ireland
- 2015 United Kingdom general election in Wales
