= 2015 United Kingdom general election in Wales =

- 7 May 2015

All 40 Welsh seats to the House of Commons
- Turnout: 65.7% (▲0.9 pp)
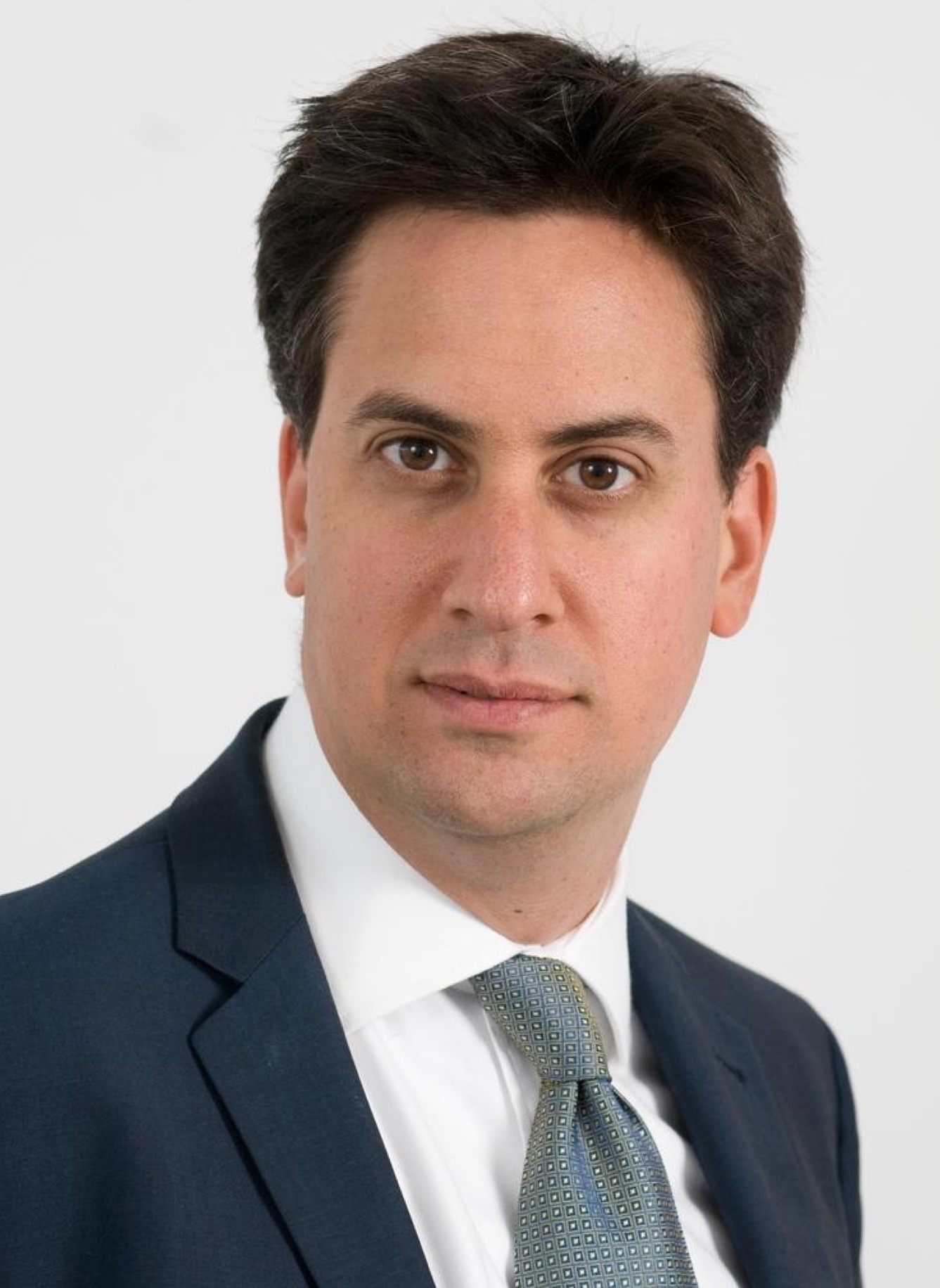

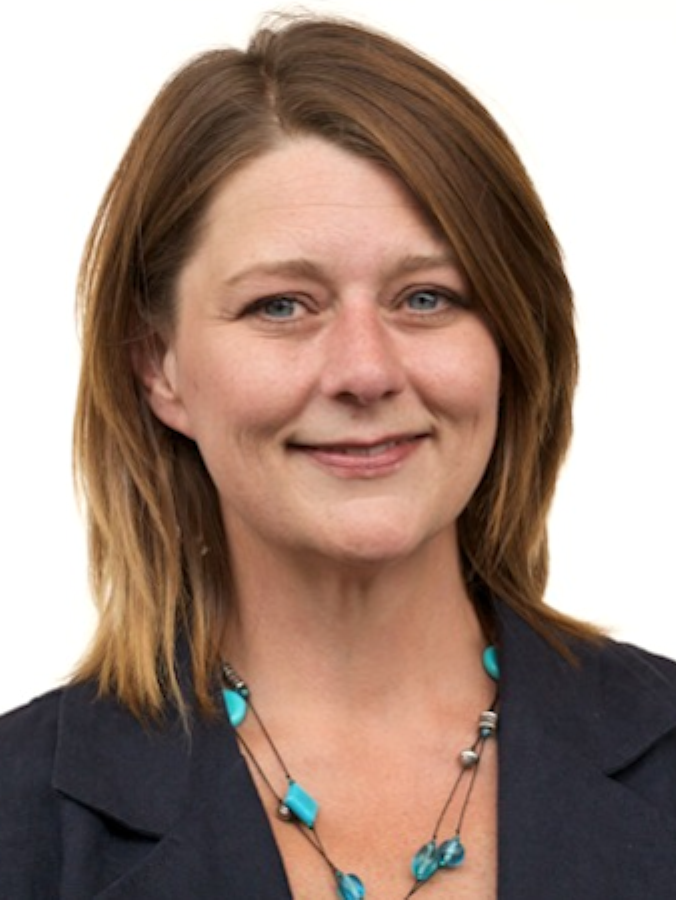

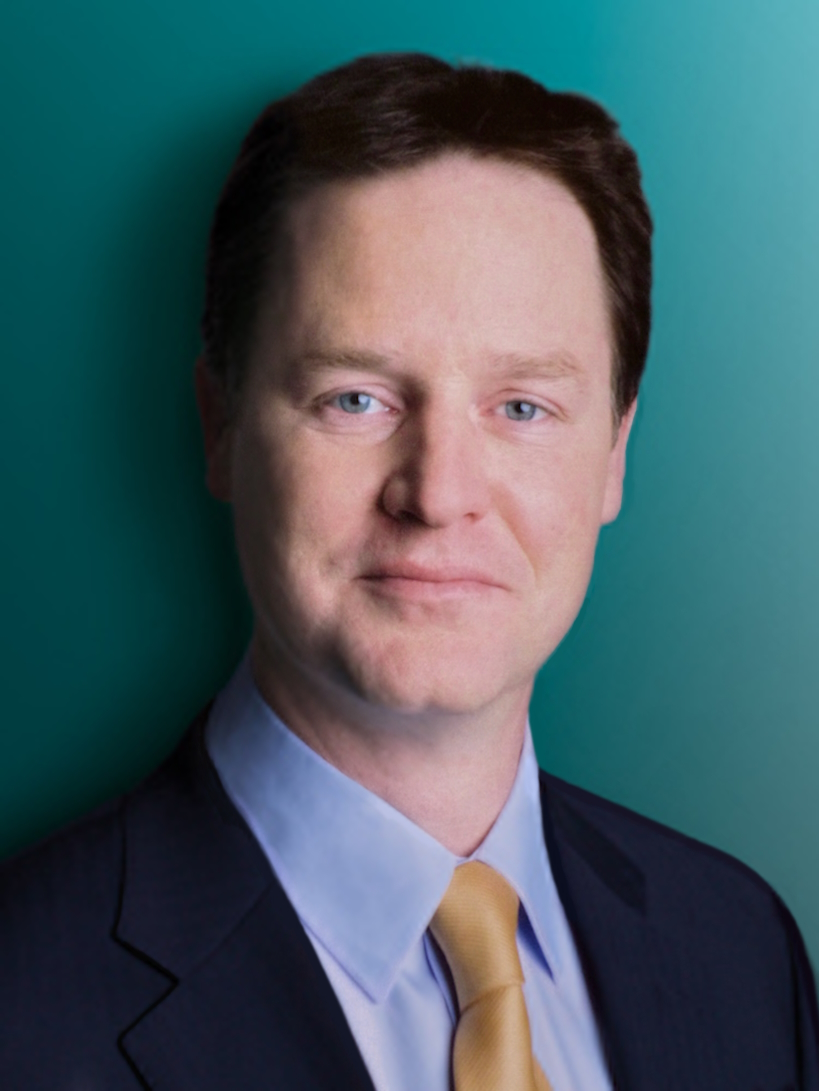

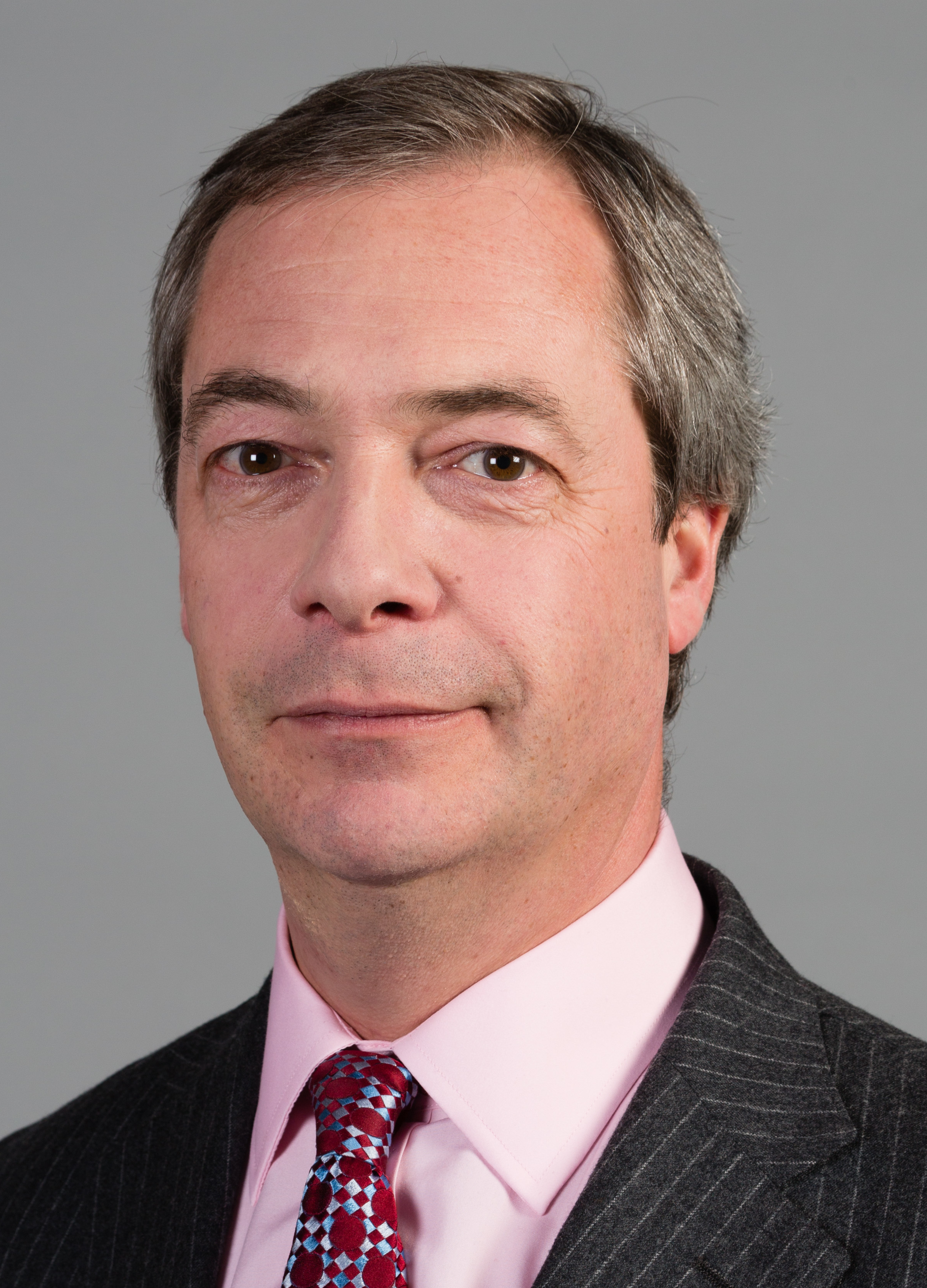
	First party	Second party	Third party
Leader	Ed Miliband	David Cameron	Leanne Wood
Party	Labour	Conservative	Plaid Cymru
Leader since	25 September 2010	6 December 2005	16 March 2012
Leader's seat	Doncaster North	Witney	Did not stand
Last election	26 seats, 36.2%	8 seats, 26.1%	3 seats, 11.3%
Seats won	25	11	3
Seat change	▼1	▲3	Steady
Popular vote	552,473	408,213	181,704
Percentage	36.9%	27.2%	12.1%
Swing	▲0.6 pp	▲1.1 pp	▲0.8 pp
	Fourth party	Fifth party
Leader	Nick Clegg	Nigel Farage
Party	Liberal Democrats	UKIP
Leader since	18 December 2007	5 November 2010
Leader's seat	Sheffield Hallam	Ran in South Thanet (defeated)
Last election	3 seats, 20.1%	0 seats, 2.4%
Seats before		0
Seats won	1	0
Seat change	▼2	Steady
Popular vote	97,783	204,330
Percentage	6.5%	13.6%
Swing	▼13.6 pp	▲11.2 pp

On Thursday 7 May 2015, the 2015 United Kingdom general election was held in Wales, to elect all 650 members of the House of Commons, with 40 constituencies being in Wales. The election for each seat was conducted on the basis of first-past-the-post.

Despite the Labour party winning the most votes in Wales, the Conservatives won across the UK.

== Candidates ==
Below is a table summarising the candidates of the 2015 general election in Wales.

Affiliation	Candidates
Labour Party	40
Conservative and Unionist Party	40
Liberal Democrats	40
Plaid Cymru	40
UK Independence Party	40
Green Party of England and Wales	35
Trade Unionist and Socialist Coalition	12
Independent	9
Socialist Labour Party	8
Official Monster Raving Loony Party	2
Christian Party	1
Save Whithybush Save Lives	1
People First	1
Communist Party of Britain	1
Cannabis Is Safer Than Alcohol	1
Above and Beyond Party	1
Pirate Party	1
English Democrats	1
Alter Change	1
National Front	1
Socialist Party of Great Britain	1
The New Society of Worth	1
Total	278

== Results ==
Party	Seats					Aggregate votes		
Party	Total	Gains	Losses	Net	Of all (%)	Total	Of all (%)	Change (%)
Labour	25	1	2	▼1	62.5	552,473	36.9	▲0.6
Conservative	11	3	0	▲3	27.5	407,813	27.2	▲1.1
UKIP	0	0	0	Steady	—	204,330	13.6	▲11.2
Plaid Cymru	3	0	0	Steady	7.5	181,704	12.1	▲0.8
Liberal Democrats	1	0	2	▼2	2.5	97,783	6.5	▼13.6
Green	0	0	0	Steady	—	38,344	2.6	▲2.1
Independent	0	0	0	Steady	—	4,275	0.3	▼0.7
Save Whithybush Save Lives	0	New			—	3,729	0.2	New
Socialist Labour	0	0	0	Steady	—	3,481	0.2	▲0.1
TUSC	0	0	0	Steady	—	1,780	0.1	▲0.1
Monster Raving Loony	0	0	0	Steady	—	466	0.0	Steady
People First	0	New			—	407	0.0	New
Christian	0	0	0	Steady	—	331	0.0	▼0.1
Communist	0	0	0	Steady	—	330	0.0	Steady
CISTA	0	New			—	238	0.0	New
Above and Beyond	0	New			—	194	0.0	New
Pirate	0	New			—	106	0.0	New
English Democrat	0	New			—	100	0.0	New
Alter Change	0	New			—	78	0.0	New
National Front	0	0	0	Steady	—	66	0.0	Steady
Socialist (GB)	0	Did not stand in 2010			—	49	0.0	—N/a
New Society of Worth	0	New			—	23	0.0	New
Total	40			0	100.0	1,498,100	100.0	0.0
Registered voters, and turnout						2,282,297	65.7	▲0.9

Popular vote
Labour	36.87%
Conservative	27.22%
UKIP	13.64%
Plaid Cymru	12.13%
Liberal Democrats	6.53%
Greens	2.56%
Other	1.05%

Parliament seats
Labour	62.50%
Conservative	27.50%
Plaid Cymru	7.50%
Liberal Democrats	2.50%

== Turnout statistics ==
Election turnout statistics		source and comment
Estimated total population of Wales	3.1M	data for 30 June 2015
Total eligible electorate	2.281M	^{1}
electorate as proportion of total population	74%	
Total valid votes	1.498M	^{1}
Mean turnout based on total valid votes	65.67%	
Mean as average of constituency results	65.64%	
Mean as above but based on ballot box turnout	65.77%	^{1} ballot box turnout includes rejected ballots
Median valid vote turnout	65.0%	turnout midway between 20th and 21st constituency
UK median valid vote turnout	66.7%	for comparison with above

^{1} valid vote, count of rejected ballots and total electorate come from the source(s) given in 'Table of results by constituency' below.

== Results by constituency ==
Table of results by constituency
Constituency ^{1}	Total electorate ^{2}	Winning party	Majority	Source(s)
Aberavon	49,821	Labour hold	10,445	
Aberconwy	45,525	Conservative hold	3,999	
Alyn and Deeside	62,016	Labour hold	3,343	
Arfon	40,492	Plaid Cymru hold	3,668	
Blaenau Gwent	51,335	Labour hold	12,703	
Brecon and Radnorshire	54,441	Conservative gain	5,102	
Bridgend	59,998	Labour hold	1,927	
Caerphilly	63,603	Labour hold	10,073	
Cardiff Central	57,456	Labour gain	4,981	
Cardiff North	67,196	Conservative hold	2,137	
Cardiff South and Penarth	76,006	Labour Co-operative Party hold	7,453	
Cardiff West	66,762	Labour hold	6,789	
Carmarthen East and Dinefwr	55,605	Plaid Cymru hold	5,599	
Carmarthen West and South Pembrokeshire	57,777	Conservative hold	6,054	
Ceredigion	54,243	Liberal Democrats hold	3,067	
Clwyd South	54,996	Labour hold	2,402	
Clwyd West	58,644	Conservative hold	6,730	
Cynon Valley	51,422	Labour hold	9,406	
Delyn	53,639	Labour hold	2,930	
Dwyfor Meirionnydd	44,394	Plaid Cymru hold	5,261	
Gower	61,820	Conservative gain	27	
Islwyn	55,697	Labour Co-operative Party hold	10,404	
Llanelli	59,796	Labour hold	7,095	
Merthyr Tydfil and Rhymney	61,716	Labour hold	11,513	
Monmouth	62,248	Conservative hold	10,982	
Montgomeryshire	48,690	Conservative hold	5,325	
Neath	56,097	Labour hold	9,546	
Newport East	56,015	Labour hold	4,705	
Newport West	62,137	Labour hold	3,510	
Ogmore	55,320	Labour hold	13,043	
Pontypridd	58,940	Labour hold	8,985	
Preseli Pembrokeshire	57,371	Conservative hold	4,969	
Rhondda	51,811	Labour hold	7,455	
Swansea East	58,011	Labour hold	12,028	
Swansea West	58,776	Labour ^{3} hold	7,036	
Torfaen	61,896	Labour hold	8,169	
Vale of Clwyd	56,505	Conservative gain	237	
Vale of Glamorgan	72,187	Conservative hold	6,880	
Wrexham	50,992	Labour hold	1,831	
Ynys Môn	49,939	Labour hold	229	

^{1} The information on the winning party and the majority come from the source(s) indicated.
^{2} The total electorate comes from unless another reference is given.
^{3} The MP is a Labour Co-op Party member but he was nominated as 'Welsh Labour'.

== Target seats ==
=== Labour ===
- Gower, Conservative, 0.1%
- Vale of Clwyd, Conservative, 0.7%
- Cardiff North, Conservative, 4.2%

=== Conservative ===
- Bridgend, Labour, 4.9%
- Wrexham, Labour, 5.6%
- Clwyd South, Labour, 6.9%
- Delyn, Labour, 7.8%
- Alyn and Deeside, Labour, 8.1%
- Newport West, Labour, 8.7%

=== Plaid Cymru ===
- Ynys Môn, Labour, 0.7%
- Ceredigion, Liberal Democrats, 8.2%

== Opinion polling ==
Date(s) conducted	Polling organisation/client	Sample size	Plaid	Lab	Con	LD	UKIP	Green	Others	Lead
16 April 2015	Five-way Opposition Leaders' Debate held on BBC One									
13–15 April 2015	YouGov/ITV/Cardiff University	1,143	12%	40%	26%	6%	13%	4%	<0.5%	14%
2 April 2015	Seven-way Leaders' Debate on ITV									
26–31 Mar 2015	YouGov/The Sun	1,035	9%	40%	27%	6%	13%	5%	1%	13%
30 March 2015	Dissolution of Parliament and the official start of the election campaign									
24–27 Mar 2015	YouGov/ITV Wales	1,189	11%	40%	25%	5%	14%	5%	1%	15%
26 March 2015	First TV election interview by Jeremy Paxman with David Cameron and Ed Miliband on Sky and Channel 4									
5–9 Mar 2015	YouGov/ITV Wales	1,279	10%	39%	25%	5%	14%	6%	1%	14%
19–21 Jan 2015	YouGov/ITV Wales	1,036	10%	37%	23%	6%	16%	8%	1%	14%
8–13 Jan 2015	ICM/BBC Wales	1,004	12%	38%	21%	7%	13%	6%	2%	17%
2–3 Dec 2014	YouGov/ITV Wales	1,131	11%	36%	23%	5%	18%	5%	2%	13%
19–22 Sep 2014	ICM/BBC Wales	1,006	13%	39%	23%	5%	16%	2%	1%	16%
8–11 Sep 2014	YouGov/ITV Wales	1,025	11%	38%	23%	6%	17%	5%	1%	15%
26 Jun–1 Jul 2014	YouGov/ITV Wales	1,035	11%	41%	25%	5%	14%	3%	2%	16%
22 May 2014	2014 European Parliament elections									
12–14 May 2014	YouGov/ITV Wales	1,092	11%	43%	22%	7%	13%	3%	2%	21%
11–22 Apr 2014	YouGov/University of Cardiff	1,027	11%	45%	24%	7%	10%	1%	2%	21%
21–24 Feb 2014	ICM/BBC Wales	1,000	15%	45%	24%	6%	8%	2%	1%	21%
10–12 Feb 2014	YouGov/ITV Wales	1,250	11%	47%	22%	7%	9%	2%	2%	25%
2–4 Dec 2013	YouGov/ITV Wales	1,001	12%	46%	21%	8%	10%	2%	2%	25%
18–22 Jul 2013	YouGov	1,012	9%	48%	23%	8%	8%	2%	2%	25%
18–20 Feb 2013	YouGov/ITV Wales	1,007	10%	51%	22%	9%	7%	1%	1%	29%
2–4 Jul 2012	YouGov/ITV Wales	1,000	10%	54%	23%	4%	9%			21%
3 May 2012	2012 Welsh local elections									
12–16 Apr 2012	YouGov	1,039	12%	50%	23%	7%	9%			27%
30 Jan–1 Feb 2012	YouGov/ITV Wales	1,008	11%	50%	25%	6%	5%	3%	2%	25%
5 May 2011	2011 Welsh Assembly election									
2–4 May 2011	YouGov/ITV Wales	1,010	10%	50%	24%	8%	4%	2%	2%	25%
6 May 2010	General election results	1,466,690	11.3%	36.2%	26.1%	20.1%	2.4%	0.4%	3.4%	10%

== See also ==
- 2015 United Kingdom general election in England
- 2015 United Kingdom general election in Scotland
- 2015 United Kingdom general election in Northern Ireland
- List of MPs for constituencies in Wales (2015–2017)
