= 2015 United Kingdom general election in Northern Ireland =

- 7 May 2015

All 18 seats in Northern Ireland to the House of Commons
- Turnout: 58.1% (▲0.5 pp)
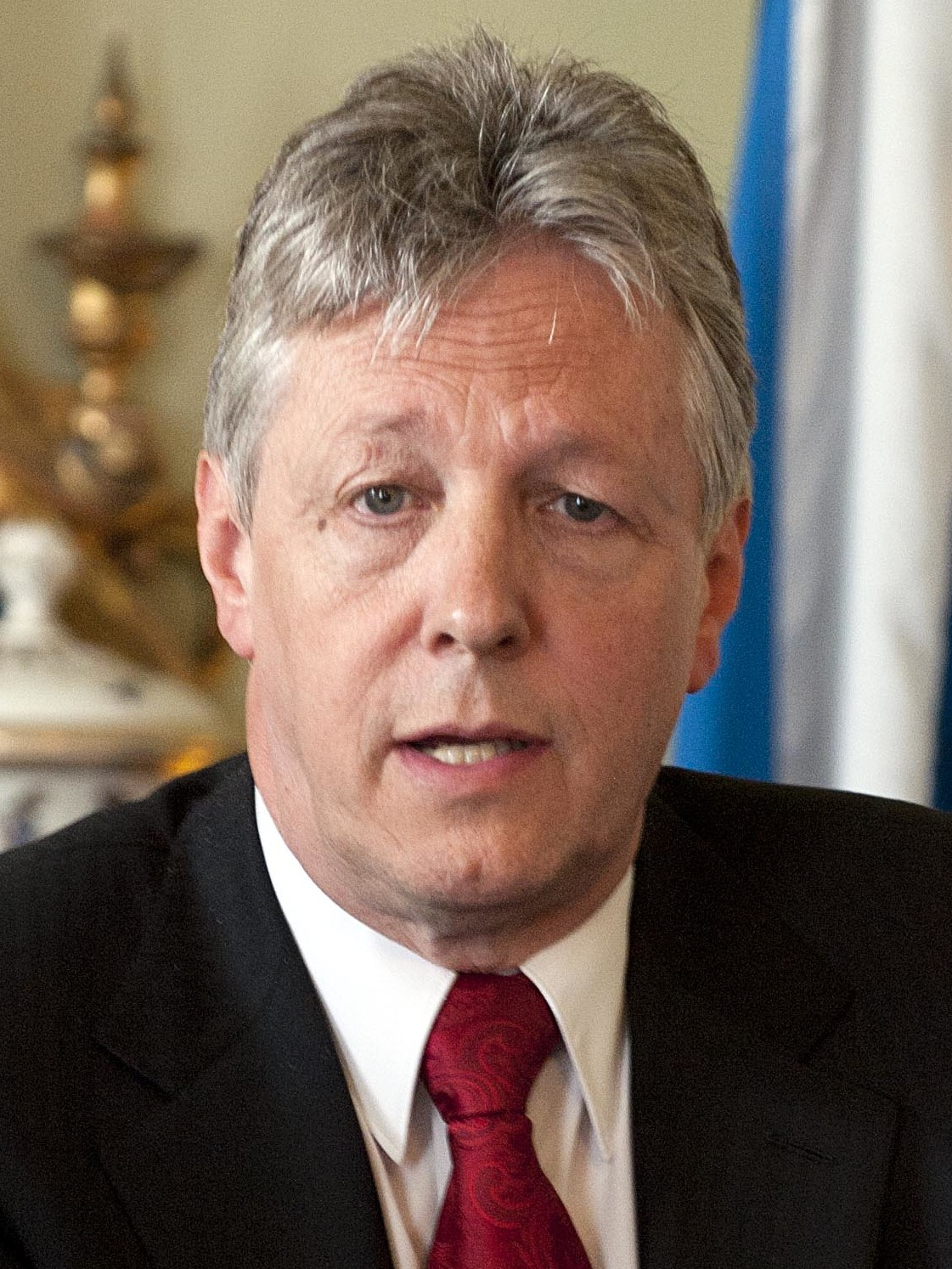

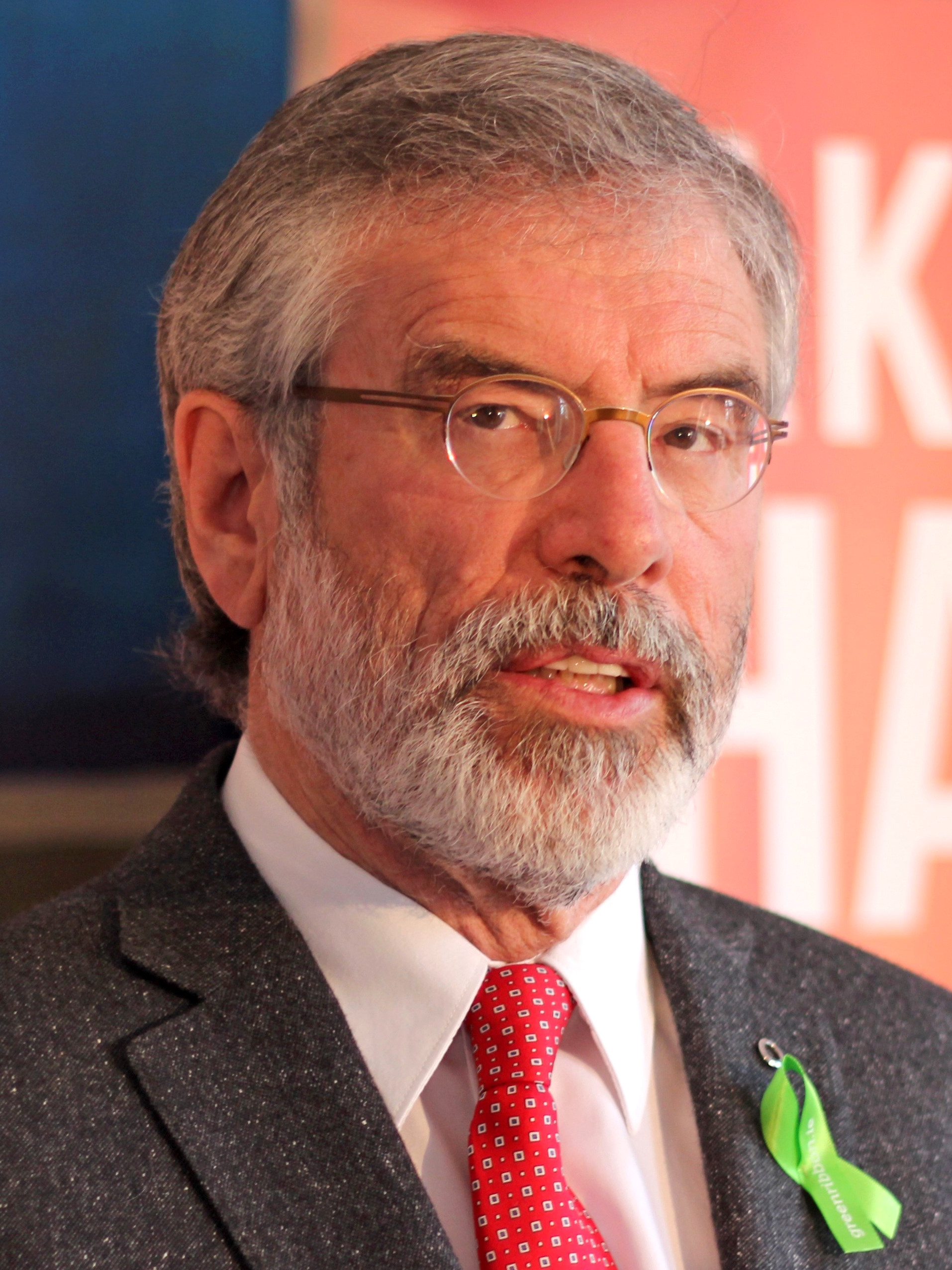

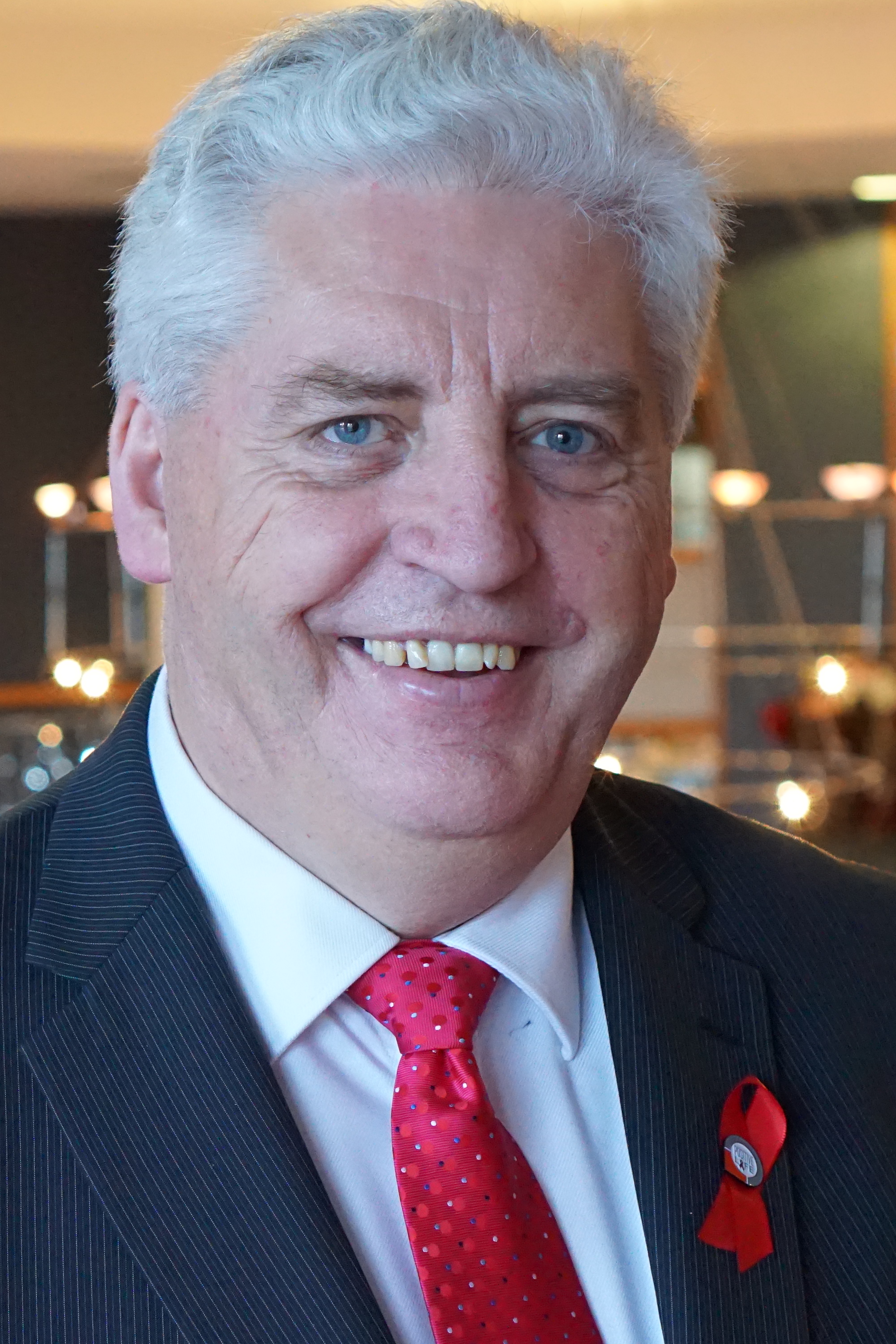

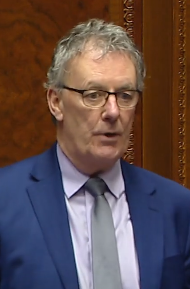

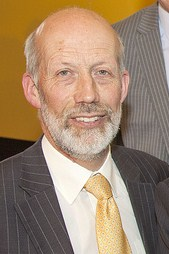
	First party	Second party	Third party
Leader	Peter Robinson	Gerry Adams	Alasdair McDonnell
Party	DUP	Sinn Féin	SDLP
Leader since	31 May 2008	13 November 1983	5 November 2011
Leader's seat	Did not stand (Note: Peter Robinson sat as an MLA in the Northern Ireland Assembly for Belfast East. The party's leader in the Commons was Nigel Dodds, the MP for Belfast North)	Did not stand (Note: Gerry Adams sat as a TD in the Dáil Éireann for Louth.)	Belfast South
Last election	8 seats, 25.0%	5 seats, 25.5%	3 seats, 16.5%
Seats won	8	4	3
Seat change	Steady	▼1	Steady
Popular vote	184,260	176,232	99,809
Percentage	25.7%	24.5%	13.9%
Swing	▲0.7 pp	▼1.0 pp	▼2.6 pp
	Fourth party	Fifth party
Leader	Mike Nesbitt	David Ford
Party	UUP	Alliance
Leader since	31 March 2012	6 October 2001
Leader's seat	Did not stand (Note: Mike Nesbitt sat as an MLA in the Northern Ireland Assembly for Strangford.)	Did not stand (Note: David Ford sat as an MLA in the Northern Ireland Assembly for South Antrim.)
Last election	0 seats, 15.2% (Note: As Ulster Conservatives and Unionists.)	1 seat, 6.3%
Seats won	2	0
Seat change	▲2	▼1
Popular vote	114,935	61,556
Percentage	16.0%	8.6%
Swing	▲0.8 pp	▲2.3 pp
- Colours on map indicate winning party for each constituency.

The 2015 United Kingdom general election in Northern Ireland was held on 7 May 2015 and all 18 seats were contested. 1,236,765 people were eligible to vote, up 67,581 from the 2010 general election. 58.45% of eligible voters turned out, an increase of half a percentage point from the last general election. This election saw the return of Ulster Unionists to the House of Commons, after they targeted 4 seats but secured 2.

== Debate ==
A political debate was held between the leaders of the five main parties in Northern Ireland: the Democratic Unionist Party, Sinn Féin, the Ulster Unionist Party, Social Democratic and Labour Party and Alliance Party of Northern Ireland as part of BBC Newsnight on 16 April 2015.

== Constituencies and MPs ==
Northern Ireland returned eighteen members of parliament to the House of Commons, one for each of its 18 parliamentary constituencies.

MP	Constituency	Party	Since
Gavin Robinson	Belfast East	Democratic Unionist Party	2015
Nigel Dodds	Belfast North	Democratic Unionist Party	2001
Alasdair McDonnell	Belfast South	Social Democratic and Labour Party	2005
Paul Maskey	Belfast West	Sinn Féin	2011
Sammy Wilson	East Antrim	Democratic Unionist Party	2005
Gregory Campbell	East Londonderry	Democratic Unionist Party	2001
Tom Elliott	Fermanagh and South Tyrone	Ulster Unionist Party	2015
Mark Durkan	Foyle	Social Democratic and Labour Party	2005
Jeffrey Donaldson	Lagan Valley	Democratic Unionist Party	1997
Francie Molloy	Mid Ulster	Sinn Féin	2013
Mickey Brady	Newry and Armagh	Sinn Féin	2015
Ian Paisley Jr	North Antrim	Democratic Unionist Party	2010
Sylvia Hermon	North Down	Independent Unionist	2001
Danny Kinahan	South Antrim	Ulster Unionist Party	2015
Margaret Ritchie	South Down	Social Democratic and Labour Party	2010
Jim Shannon	Strangford	Democratic Unionist Party	2010
David Simpson	Upper Bann	Democratic Unionist Party	2005
Pat Doherty	West Tyrone	Sinn Féin	2001

== Results ==
In total, three seats changed hands in Northern Ireland – Belfast East, Fermanagh and South Tyrone and South Antrim.

=== Unionists ===
Prior to the election, the two main unionist parties – the Democratic Unionist Party (DUP) and the Ulster Unionist Party (UUP) – had agreed not to stand against each other in certain seats. The DUP stood aside in Fermanagh and South Tyrone, and in Newry and Armagh, while the UUP did not contest Belfast East and Belfast North.

The DUP retained their position as the largest unionist party, and also overtook Sinn Féin to once again poll the largest number of votes in Northern Ireland (they had last achieved this in 2005, with Sinn Féin taking the top position in 2010). The DUP succeeded in re-taking one of the unionist pact seats – Belfast East – which party leader Peter Robinson had lost to the Alliance Party's Naomi Long in 2010. Gavin Robinson (no relation to Peter) won the seat with a majority of over 2,500 votes. Elsewhere, the DUP retained Belfast North where the UUP had also stood aside, as well as East Antrim, East Londonderry, Lagan Valley, North Antrim, Strangford and Upper Bann.

In a surprise result, the UUP gained South Antrim from the DUP, where Danny Kinahan defeated veteran MP William McCrea by 949 votes. They also gained Fermanagh and South Tyrone from Sinn Féin, as former leader Tom Elliott took the seat from Michelle Gildernew by 530 votes. The seat had been the site of a unionist pact in 2010, when the DUP and UUP both supported an independent candidate, who went on to be defeated by Gildernew by just four votes. The two seats for the UUP marked their best election since 2001, and they also managed to increase their vote share slightly to overtake the SDLP into third place in Northern Ireland.

No other unionist parties won seats, with Traditional Unionist Voice (TUV) seeing their vote fall by almost 10,000 (though with three fewer candidates). TUV did however retain second place in North Antrim, though they remained over 11,000 votes behind the DUP. They also saved their deposit in three other seats. The United Kingdom Independence Party contested their first general election in Northern Ireland. They polled 18,000 votes in ten constituencies, saving their deposit in four. Their best performance came in East Antrim where they won nearly 11% of the vote. The Northern Ireland Conservatives were contesting a general election as a separate party for the first time since 2005 (they had previously entered into an electoral alliance with the UUP). The party stood in 16 constituencies (not in Belfast North and Fermanagh and South Tyrone), polling just over 9,000 votes in total. They kept their deposit in one seat – Strangford.

=== Nationalists ===
Sinn Féin were the second largest Northern Ireland party, and the largest nationalist party in terms of both votes and seats, despite their loss of Fermanagh and South Tyrone and a small drop in vote share. They easily retained Belfast West, Mid Ulster and West Tyrone – the first of these being the safest seat in Northern Ireland with a 35% majority. In Newry and Armagh, new candidate Mickey Brady saw off the UUP's Danny Kennedy despite the unionist unity pact in the constituency. Brady secured a majority of over 4,000 votes, though this was about half the Sinn Féin majority in 2010.

The SDLP came fourth in terms of vote, but third in terms of seats. They saw the largest change in vote share for any of the four largest parties – a decrease of 2.6 percentage points. They retained both Foyle and South Down in the face of strong Sinn Féin challenges. In South Down, Margaret Ritchie was re-elected with a majority reduced from over 8,000 to just under 6,000, although her colleague Mark Durkan in Foyle saw a small swing to the SDLP. Party leader Alasdair McDonnell narrowly retained Belfast South with just 9,560 votes (a share of only 24.5% – the lowest of any winning candidate in the UK in 2015). The DUP came second with 22%, followed by the Alliance Party on 17% and Sinn Féin on 14%.

=== Independents and other parties ===
Independent MP Sylvia Hermon polled 17,689 votes to retain her North Down seat, though with a reduced majority of 9,202 (down from over 14,000 in 2010). Four other independent candidates stood, taking 1,508 votes between them.

The Alliance Party saw a growth in support, going from 6.4% to 8.6% of the vote. They retained their deposit in 10 of the 18 constituencies, and even managed to secure an increase in their vote of 5.6% in Belfast East, which they lost to the DUP. Apart from Belfast East, their best performances were in Belfast South where they took 17%, followed by East Antrim at 15%.

The Green Party stood five candidates – one more than in 2010. They polled 6,822 votes, a 1% share of the NI total. Belfast South provided their best result at 5.7%, while party leader Steven Agnew took 5.4% in North Down. The People Before Profit Alliance stood a single candidate, Gerry Carroll, in Belfast West. He had previously contested the by-election in 2011 where he came third with 8% of the vote. In 2015 he substantially improved on this result, coming second behind Sinn Féin with 6,798 votes, or 19%.

Two parties contested the 2015 election who had not stood in 2010 – the Workers' Party stood five candidates and polled 2,724 votes, and Cannabis Is Safer Than Alcohol had four candidates who polled a total of 1,853 votes. Neither of these parties retained any deposits.

=== Full results ===
Party	Seats					Aggregate Votes		
Party	Total	Gains	Losses	Net	Of all (%)	Total	Of all (%)	Difference
DUP	8	1	1	Steady	44.4	184,260	25.7	▲0.7
Sinn Féin	4	0	1	▼1	22.2	176,232	24.5	▼1.0
UUP	2	2	0	▲2	11.1	114,935	16.0	▲0.8
SDLP	3	0	0	Steady	16.7	99,809	13.9	▼2.6
Alliance	0	0	1	▼1	0.0	61,556	8.6	▲2.2
Independent	1	0	0	Steady	5.6	19,177	2.7	▼4.0
UKIP	0	New			0.0	18,324	2.6	New
TUV	0	0	0	Steady	0.0	16,538	2.3	▼1.6
NI Conservatives	0	New			0.0	9,055	1.3	New
Green (NI)	0	0	0	Steady	0.0	6,822	1.0	▲0.4
People Before Profit	0	0	0	Steady	0.0	6,798	0.9	▲0.5
Workers' Party	0	New			0.0	2,724	0.4	New
Cannabis Is Safer Than Alcohol	0	New			0.0	1,853	0.3	New
Total	18					718,100	58.1	▲0.5

Note: In 2010, the Ulster Unionist Party and the Conservative Party formed an electoral alliance in which their candidates stood as "Ulster Conservatives and Unionists – New Force". The UUP vote in the table above is compared to the UCU-NF vote in 2010. The NI Conservatives who contested the 2015 election as a separate entity are treated in the table as a new party.

=== Votes and seats summary ===
Popular vote
DUP	25.7%
Sinn Féin	24.5%
UUP	16.0%
SDLP	13.9%
Alliance	8.6%
Independent	2.7%
UKIP	2.6%
TUV	2.3%
NI Conservatives	1.3%
Greens	1.0%
Other	1.4%

Parliament seats
DUP	44.4%
Sinn Féin	22.2%
SDLP	16.7%
UUP	11.1%
Independent Unionist	5.6%

== See also ==
- 2015 United Kingdom general election in England
- 2015 United Kingdom general election in Scotland
- 2015 United Kingdom general election in Wales
